= Waikawa Beach =

Settlement in Manawatū-Whanganui, New Zealand

- Rural settlement
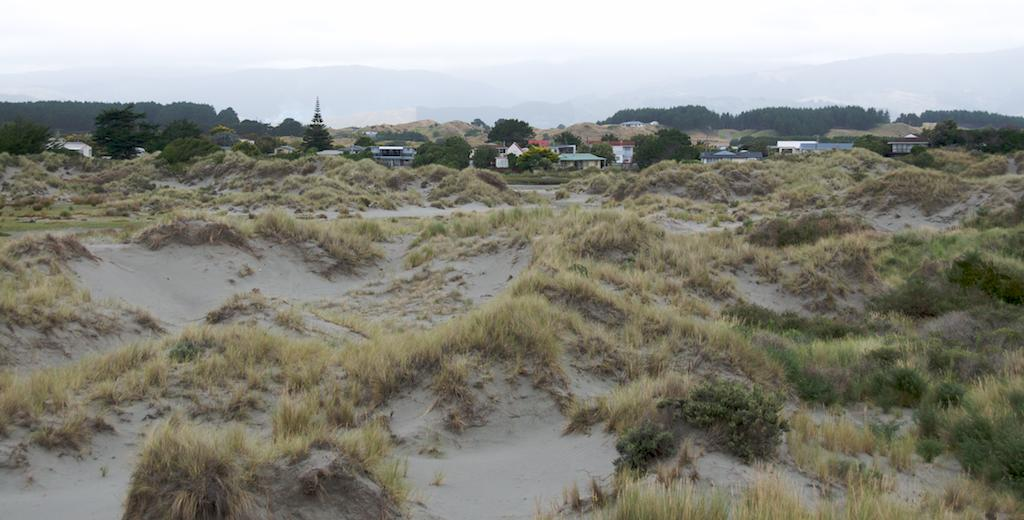
- Sand dunes at Waikawa beach
- Interactive map of Waikawa Beach
- Coordinates: 40.688°S 175.149°E
- Country: New Zealand
- Region: Manawatū-Whanganui region
- Territorial authority: Horowhenua District
- Wards: Waiopehu General Ward; Horowhenua Māori Ward
- Electorates: Rangitīkei; Te Tai Hauāuru (Māori)

Government
  - Territorial Authority: Horowhenua District Council
  - Regional council: Horizons Regional Council
  - Horowhenua Mayor: Bernie Wanden
  - Rangitīkei MP: Suze Redmayne
  - Te Tai Hauāuru MP: Debbie Ngarewa-Packer

Area
  - Total: 1.50 km^{2} (0.58 sq mi)

Population (June 2025)
  - Total: 190
  - Density: 130/km^{2} (330/sq mi)

Waikawa Beach is a small settlement in the Horowhenua District of the Manawatū-Whanganui region of New Zealand's North Island. It is located on the South Taranaki Bight at the mouth of Waikawa Stream, 7.5 kilometres northwest of Manakau, and 19 kilometres southwest of Levin, both distances being by road.

Hank Edwards Reserve is a small park adjacent to a footpath over Waikawa Stream.

The toilet block was originally built in the late 1960s. In 2022 it was extensively remodelled at a cost of at least $369,687 plus GST. The Facilities Block now offers two accessible toilets, a family changing room, and storage for use by the Waikawa Beach Ratepayers Association. There are also outdoor showers, a gas barbecue and picnic tables under cover, and drinking fountain.

On Monday 13 October 2008 a concrete boat ramp was laid next to the footbridge by volunteers from the community. The ramp is suitable for kayaks and small boats.

Erosion near the stream mouth has been a problem since the 1930s and particularly from February 2018.

== Bird Life ==
Waikawa Beach includes rural landscape, river, beach, wetlands and a couple of small freshwater lakes, Waimarie and Te Puna a te Ora. This allows for a wealth of birdlife including gulls, terns, dotterels, herons, shovelers, spoonbills, the Nationally Critical bittern, shags, godwits and dozens of other species.

== Demographics ==
Waikawa Beach is described by Statistics New Zealand as a rural settlement, which covers 1.50 km^{2} (0.58 sq mi). It had an estimated population of 190 as of June 2025, with a population density of 127 people per km^{2}. It is part of the larger Waikawa statistical area.

Historical population for Waikawa Beach
Year	Pop.	±% p.a.
2006	114	—
2013	102	−1.58%
2018	132	+5.29%
2023	174	+5.68%

Waikawa Beach had a population of 174 in the 2023 New Zealand census, an increase of 42 people (31.8%) since the 2018 census, and an increase of 72 people (70.6%) since the 2013 census. There were 87 males and 90 females in 99 dwellings. 5.2% of people identified as LGBTIQ+. The median age was 59.6 years (compared with 38.1 years nationally). There were 12 people (6.9%) aged under 15 years, 12 (6.9%) aged 15 to 29, 93 (53.4%) aged 30 to 64, and 57 (32.8%) aged 65 or older.

People could identify as more than one ethnicity. The results were 93.1% European (Pākehā), 13.8% Māori, and 3.4% Pasifika. English was spoken by 96.6%, Māori by 5.2%, and other languages by 1.7%. No language could be spoken by 3.4% (e.g. too young to talk). New Zealand Sign Language was known by 1.7%. The percentage of people born overseas was 17.2, compared with 28.8% nationally.

Religious affiliations were 32.8% Christian, 1.7% Māori religious beliefs, 1.7% Buddhist, 1.7% Jewish, and 3.4% other religions. People who answered that they had no religion were 51.7%, and 8.6% of people did not answer the census question.

Of those at least 15 years old, 36 (22.2%) people had a bachelor's or higher degree, 96 (59.3%) had a post-high school certificate or diploma, and 27 (16.7%) people exclusively held high school qualifications. The median income was $42,000, compared with $41,500 nationally. 30 people (18.5%) earned over $100,000 compared to 12.1% nationally. The employment status of those at least 15 was 66 (40.7%) full-time, 24 (14.8%) part-time, and 3 (1.9%) unemployed.

=== Waikawa ===
Waikawa statistical area, which also includes Hokio Beach, covers 62.16 km^{2} (24.00 sq mi) and had an estimated population of 940 as of June 2025, with a population density of 15 people per km^{2}.

Historical population for Waikawa statistical area
Year	Pop.	±% p.a.
2006	756	—
2013	738	−0.34%
2018	750	+0.32%
2023	879	+3.23%

The statistical area had a population of 879 in the 2023 New Zealand census, an increase of 129 people (17.2%) since the 2018 census, and an increase of 141 people (19.1%) since the 2013 census. There were 450 males, 426 females, and 3 people of other genders in 417 dwellings. 2.4% of people identified as LGBTIQ+. The median age was 53.9 years (compared with 38.1 years nationally). There were 114 people (13.0%) aged under 15 years, 93 (10.6%) aged 15 to 29, 465 (52.9%) aged 30 to 64, and 210 (23.9%) aged 65 or older.

People could identify as more than one ethnicity. The results were 87.7% European (Pākehā); 22.5% Māori; 3.4% Pasifika; 1.7% Asian; 0.7% Middle Eastern, Latin American and African New Zealanders (MELAA); and 2.0% other, which includes people giving their ethnicity as "New Zealander". English was spoken by 98.3%, Māori by 4.4%, Samoan by 1.0%, and other languages by 3.4%. No language could be spoken by 1.4% (e.g. too young to talk). New Zealand Sign Language was known by 1.0%. The percentage of people born overseas was 13.0, compared with 28.8% nationally.

Religious affiliations were 28.3% Christian, 0.3% Islam, 1.0% Māori religious beliefs, 0.3% Buddhist, 1.0% New Age, 0.3% Jewish, and 1.7% other religions. People who answered that they had no religion were 58.7%, and 9.6% of people did not answer the census question.

Of those at least 15 years old, 132 (17.3%) people had a bachelor's or higher degree, 432 (56.5%) had a post-high school certificate or diploma, and 201 (26.3%) people exclusively held high school qualifications. The median income was $38,600, compared with $41,500 nationally. 90 people (11.8%) earned over $100,000 compared to 12.1% nationally. The employment status of those at least 15 was 360 (47.1%) full-time, 93 (12.2%) part-time, and 27 (3.5%) unemployed.
