= Hokio Beach =

Settlement in Manawatū-Whanganui, New Zealand

Hokio Beach Hōkio
- Rural settlement
- Interactive map of Hokio Beach
- Coordinates: 40.596506°S 175.192814°E
- Country: New Zealand
- Region: Manawatū-Whanganui region
- Territorial authority: Horowhenua District
- Wards: Waiopehu General Ward; Horowhenua Māori Ward
- Electorates: Rangitīkei (electorate); Te Tai Hauāuru (Māori)

Government
  - Territorial Authority: Horowhenua District Council
  - Regional council: Horizons Regional Council
  - Horowhenua Mayor: Bernie Wanden
  - Rangitīkei MP: Suze Redmayne
  - Te Tai Hauāuru MP: Debbie Ngarewa-Packer

Area
  - Total: 0.92 km^{2} (0.36 sq mi)

Population (June 2025)
  - Total: 220
  - Density: 240/km^{2} (620/sq mi)
- Postal code: 5571
- Area code: 06

Hokio Beach or Hōkio is a village and rural community in the Horowhenua District and Manawatū-Whanganui region of New Zealand's North Island.

It is located south of Waitarere Beach, west of Levin, and north of Waikawa Beach.

== Demographics ==
Hōkio Beach is described by Statistics New Zealand as a rural settlement, which covers 0.92 km^{2} (0.36 sq mi). It had an estimated population of 220 as of June 2025, with a population density of 268 people per km^{2}. It is part of the larger Waikawa statistical area.

Historical population
Year	Pop.	±% p.a.
2006	201	—
2013	198	−0.21%
2018	183	−1.56%
2023	210	+2.79%

Hōkio Beach had a population of 210 in the 2023 New Zealand census, an increase of 27 people (14.8%) since the 2018 census, and an increase of 12 people (6.1%) since the 2013 census. There were 105 males, 105 females, and 3 people of other genders in 105 dwellings. 2.9% of people identified as LGBTIQ+. The median age was 50.9 years (compared with 38.1 years nationally). There were 33 people (15.7%) aged under 15 years, 27 (12.9%) aged 15 to 29, 96 (45.7%) aged 30 to 64, and 54 (25.7%) aged 65 or older.

People could identify as more than one ethnicity. The results were 72.9% European (Pākehā), 47.1% Māori, 7.1% Pasifika, and 2.9% other, which includes people giving their ethnicity as "New Zealander". English was spoken by 98.6%, Māori by 10.0%, Samoan by 1.4%, and other languages by 1.4%. New Zealand Sign Language was known by 1.4%. The percentage of people born overseas was 11.4, compared with 28.8% nationally.

Religious affiliations were 30.0% Christian, 2.9% Māori religious beliefs, 2.9% New Age, and 1.4% other religions. People who answered that they had no religion were 57.1%, and 7.1% of people did not answer the census question.

Of those at least 15 years old, 18 (10.2%) people had a bachelor's or higher degree, 93 (52.5%) had a post-high school certificate or diploma, and 66 (37.3%) people exclusively held high school qualifications. The median income was $27,900, compared with $41,500 nationally. 12 people (6.8%) earned over $100,000 compared to 12.1% nationally. The employment status of those at least 15 was 57 (32.2%) full-time, 24 (13.6%) part-time, and 9 (5.1%) unemployed.

== Marae ==
The area has two marae:

- Kohuturoa Marae and Pāriri meeting house are a tribal meeting place for Muaūpoko.
- Ngātokowaru Marae and meeting house are a meeting place for the Ngāti Raukawa hapū of Ngāti Pareraukawa.

In October 2020, the Government committed $945,445 from the Provincial Growth Fund to upgrade Kohuturoa Marae and Kawiu Marae, creating 50 jobs. It also committed $106,414 to upgrade the Ngātokowaru Marae, creating 4 jobs.
