= Makahika =

Locality in Manawatū-Whanganui, New Zealand

- Rural locality
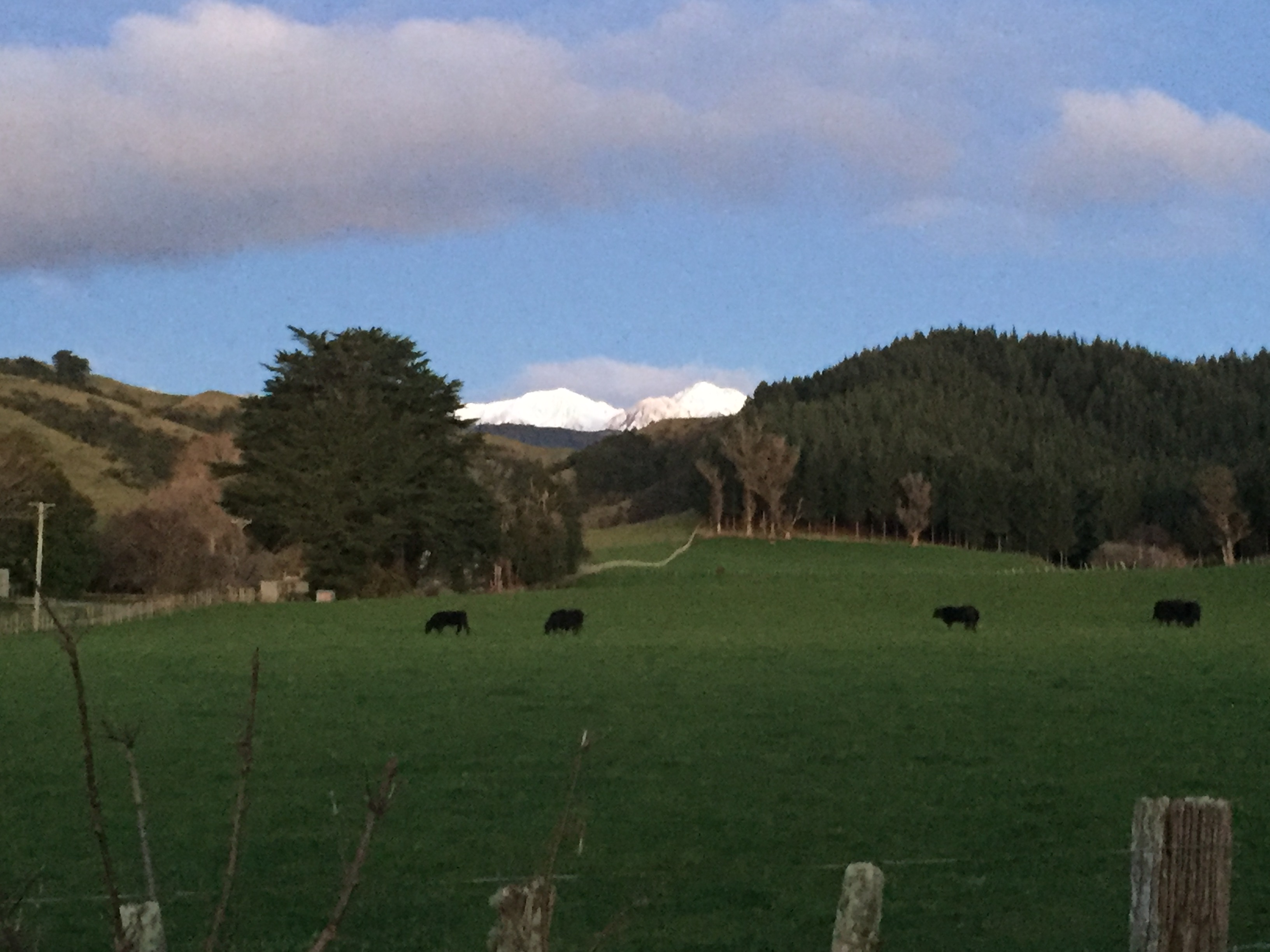
- Looking east across Makahika to the Tararua Range
- Interactive map of Makahika
- Coordinates: 40.637°S 175.399°E
- Country: New Zealand
- Region: Manawatū-Whanganui region
- Territorial authority: Horowhenua District
- Wards: Waiopehu General Ward; Horowhenua Māori Ward
- Electorates: Rangitīkei; Te Tai Hauāuru (Māori)

Government
  - Territorial Authority: Horowhenua District Council
  - Regional council: Horizons Regional Council
  - Horowhenua Mayor: Bernie Wanden
  - Rangitīkei MP: Suze Redmayne
  - Te Tai Hauāuru MP: Debbie Ngarewa-Packer

Area
  - Total: 170.32 km^{2} (65.76 sq mi)

Population (June 2025)
  - Total: 1,120
  - Density: 6.58/km^{2} (17.0/sq mi)

Makahika is a rural locality in the Horowhenua District of the Manawatū-Whanganui region of New Zealand's North Island. It is located in the Makahika Stream valley. The stream runs southwest from the Tararua Range to join the Ōhau River.

The Mangahao Makahika Track is a 15 km tramping track through the Tararua Range which takes 6-8 hours one-way depending on direction.

Glamping accommodation is available at Arete Village, part of the Makahika Outdoor Pursuits Centre.

== Demographics ==
Makahika statistical area covers 170.32 km^{2} (65.76 sq mi). It had an estimated population of 1,120 as of June 2025, with a population density of 6.6 people per km^{2}.

Historical population
Year	Pop.	±% p.a.
2006	807	—
2013	858	+0.88%
2018	960	+2.27%
2023	1,104	+2.83%

Makahika had a population of 1,104 in the 2023 New Zealand census, an increase of 144 people (15.0%) since the 2018 census, and an increase of 246 people (28.7%) since the 2013 census. There were 564 males, 534 females, and 3 people of other genders in 420 dwellings. 3.0% of people identified as LGBTIQ+. The median age was 50.5 years (compared with 38.1 years nationally). There were 156 people (14.1%) aged under 15 years, 159 (14.4%) aged 15 to 29, 540 (48.9%) aged 30 to 64, and 246 (22.3%) aged 65 or older.

People could identify as more than one ethnicity. The results were 90.2% European (Pākehā); 14.9% Māori; 4.1% Pasifika; 4.3% Asian; 0.8% Middle Eastern, Latin American and African New Zealanders (MELAA); and 3.3% other, which includes people giving their ethnicity as "New Zealander". English was spoken by 97.6%, Māori by 2.2%, and other languages by 5.7%. No language could be spoken by 1.9% (e.g. too young to talk). New Zealand Sign Language was known by 0.3%. The percentage of people born overseas was 17.1, compared with 28.8% nationally.

Religious affiliations were 29.3% Christian, 0.5% Hindu, 0.8% Māori religious beliefs, 0.5% New Age, 0.3% Jewish, and 0.5% other religions. People who answered that they had no religion were 59.5%, and 8.4% of people did not answer the census question.

Of those at least 15 years old, 177 (18.7%) people had a bachelor's or higher degree, 537 (56.6%) had a post-high school certificate or diploma, and 234 (24.7%) people exclusively held high school qualifications. The median income was $34,600, compared with $41,500 nationally. 117 people (12.3%) earned over $100,000 compared to 12.1% nationally. The employment status of those at least 15 was 447 (47.2%) full-time, 162 (17.1%) part-time, and 18 (1.9%) unemployed.
