= Tokomaru, New Zealand =

Settlement in Manawatū-Whanganui, New Zealand

Tokomaru
- Rural settlement
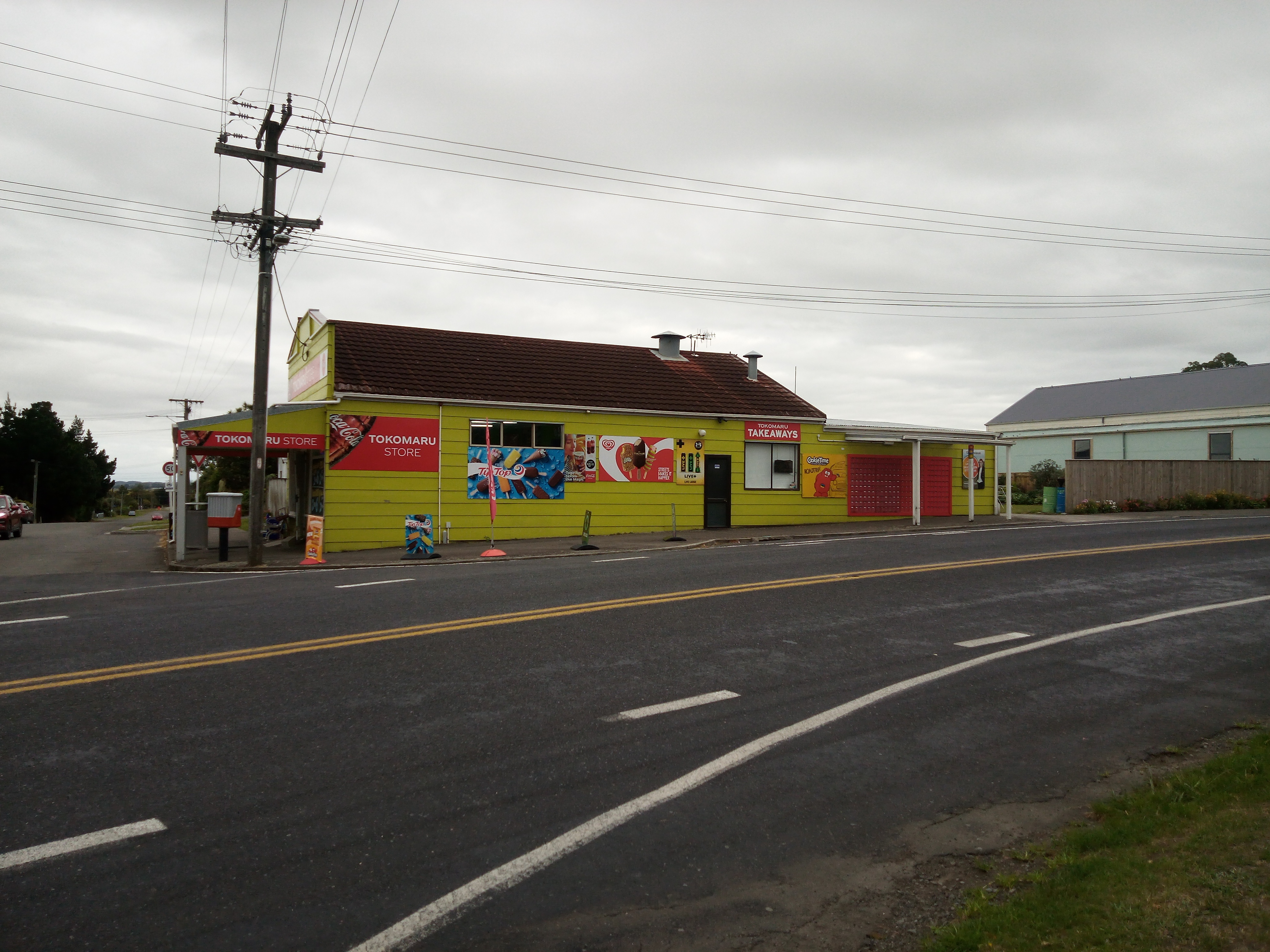
- Tokomaru Store
- Interactive map of Tokomaru
- Coordinates: 40.472°S 175.509°E
- Country: New Zealand
- Region: Manawatū-Whanganui region
- Territorial authority: Horowhenua District
- Wards: Miranui General Ward; Horowhenua Māori Ward
- Electorates: Rangitīkei; Te Tai Hauāuru (Māori)

Government
  - Territorial Authority: Horowhenua District Council
  - Regional council: Horizons Regional Council
  - Horowhenua Mayor: Bernie Wanden
  - Rangitīkei MP: Suze Redmayne
  - Te Tai Hauāuru MP: Debbie Ngarewa-Packer

Area
  - Total: 2.91 km^{2} (1.12 sq mi)

Population (June 2025)
  - Total: 620
  - Density: 210/km^{2} (550/sq mi)

Tokomaru is a small town in the district of Horowhenua, in the southwestern North Island of New Zealand. It is located 18 kilometres southwest of Palmerston North, and a similar distance northeast of Shannon. The Tokomaru railway station on the North Island Main Trunk was open from 1885 to 1982.

The Tokomaru Steam Engine Museum features a collection of antique steam engine machinery, much of which is still operational. The collection includes a 1904 Fowler traction engine, an 1897 Aveling & Porter portable engine and a huge 335 hp Filer & Stowell stationary engine-compressor ex the Imlay Freezing Works, Wanganui. The museum is open by appointment.

Tokomaru has two public reserves, the Tokomaru Domain, which includes a sports field and hall, and Horseshoe Bend reserve.

The town has a locally run combined store and post office.

There are two factories on the outskirts of Tokomaru. One of them, Stevensons Structural Engineers, built structural steel buildings, and employed many of the Tokomaru residents until it went into liquidation on Friday 3rd March 2023. The other is a former dairy factory that was being renovated in 2011.

== Demographics ==
Tokomaru is described by Stats NZ as a rural settlement, which covers 2.91 km^{2} (1.12 sq mi). It had an estimated population of 620 as of June 2025, with a population density of 213 people per km^{2}. It is part of the larger Miranui statistical area.

Historical population for Tokomaru
Year	Pop.	±% p.a.
2006	459	—
2013	525	+1.94%
2018	564	+1.44%
2023	594	+1.04%
The 2006 population is for a smaller area of 2.54 km^{2}. Source:

Tokomaru had a population of 594 in the 2023 New Zealand census, an increase of 30 people (5.3%) since the 2018 census, and an increase of 69 people (13.1%) since the 2013 census. There were 297 males, 297 females, and 3 people of other genders in 216 dwellings. 3.0% of people identified as LGBTIQ+. The median age was 34.6 years (compared with 38.1 years nationally). There were 144 people (24.2%) aged under 15 years, 105 (17.7%) aged 15 to 29, 270 (45.5%) aged 30 to 64, and 72 (12.1%) aged 65 or older.

People could identify as more than one ethnicity. The results were 84.3% European (Pākehā); 33.3% Māori; 6.1% Pasifika; 2.5% Asian; 0.5% Middle Eastern, Latin American and African New Zealanders (MELAA); and 3.0% other, which includes people giving their ethnicity as "New Zealander". English was spoken by 96.5%, Māori by 5.1%, Samoan by 0.5%, and other languages by 6.6%. No language could be spoken by 3.0% (e.g. too young to talk). New Zealand Sign Language was known by 1.5%. The percentage of people born overseas was 11.6, compared with 28.8% nationally.

Religious affiliations were 22.2% Christian, 0.5% Hindu, 0.5% Māori religious beliefs, 0.5% New Age, and 2.0% other religions. People who answered that they had no religion were 64.6%, and 9.1% of people did not answer the census question.

Of those at least 15 years old, 84 (18.7%) people had a bachelor's or higher degree, 270 (60.0%) had a post-high school certificate or diploma, and 96 (21.3%) people exclusively held high school qualifications. The median income was $49,800, compared with $41,500 nationally. 45 people (10.0%) earned over $100,000 compared to 12.1% nationally. The employment status of those at least 15 was 273 (60.7%) full-time, 54 (12.0%) part-time, and 6 (1.3%) unemployed.

=== Miranui ===
Miranui statistical area, which surrounds but does not include Shannon, and includes Mangaore, covers 296.88 km^{2} (114.63 sq mi) and had an estimated population of 2,000 as of June 2025, with a population density of 6.7 people per km^{2}.

Historical population for Miranui
Year	Pop.	±% p.a.
2006	1,533	—
2013	1,587	+0.50%
2018	1,788	+2.41%
2023	1,893	+1.15%

Miranui had a population of 1,893 in the 2023 New Zealand census, an increase of 105 people (5.9%) since the 2018 census, and an increase of 306 people (19.3%) since the 2013 census. There were 948 males, 939 females, and 6 people of other genders in 672 dwellings. 2.9% of people identified as LGBTIQ+. The median age was 35.4 years (compared with 38.1 years nationally). There were 450 people (23.8%) aged under 15 years, 327 (17.3%) aged 15 to 29, 888 (46.9%) aged 30 to 64, and 225 (11.9%) aged 65 or older.

People could identify as more than one ethnicity. The results were 84.3% European (Pākehā); 23.3% Māori; 3.8% Pasifika; 6.0% Asian; 1.1% Middle Eastern, Latin American and African New Zealanders (MELAA); and 4.4% other, which includes people giving their ethnicity as "New Zealander". English was spoken by 97.3%, Māori by 4.1%, Samoan by 0.3%, and other languages by 6.8%. No language could be spoken by 2.4% (e.g. too young to talk). New Zealand Sign Language was known by 1.0%. The percentage of people born overseas was 13.6, compared with 28.8% nationally.

Religious affiliations were 28.8% Christian, 0.5% Hindu, 0.2% Islam, 0.5% Māori religious beliefs, 0.5% Buddhist, 0.5% New Age, 0.2% Jewish, and 1.1% other religions. People who answered that they had no religion were 59.6%, and 8.7% of people did not answer the census question.

Of those at least 15 years old, 264 (18.3%) people had a bachelor's or higher degree, 876 (60.7%) had a post-high school certificate or diploma, and 309 (21.4%) people exclusively held high school qualifications. The median income was $46,800, compared with $41,500 nationally. 159 people (11.0%) earned over $100,000 compared to 12.1% nationally. The employment status of those at least 15 was 843 (58.4%) full-time, 216 (15.0%) part-time, and 27 (1.9%) unemployed.

== Education ==
Tokomaru School is a co-educational state primary school for Year 1 to 8 students, with a roll of 71 as of July 2026. It opened in 1893.
