= Muhunoa East =

Locality in Manawatū-Whanganui, New Zealand

- Rural locality
- Interactive map of Muhunoa East
- Coordinates: 40.679°S 175.299°E
- Country: New Zealand
- Region: Manawatū-Whanganui region
- Territorial authority: Horowhenua District
- Wards: Waiopehu General Ward; Horowhenua Māori Ward
- Electorates: Rangitīkei; Te Tai Hauāuru (Māori)

Government
  - Territorial Authority: Horowhenua District Council
  - Regional council: Horizons Regional Council
  - Horowhenua Mayor: Bernie Wanden
  - Rangitīkei MP: Suze Redmayne
  - Te Tai Hauāuru MP: Debbie Ngarewa-Packer

Area
  - Total: 64.13 km^{2} (24.76 sq mi)

Population (2023 Census)
  - Total: 126
  - Density: 1.96/km^{2} (5.09/sq mi)

Muhunoa East is a rural locality in the Horowhenua District of the Manawatū-Whanganui region of New Zealand's North Island. It is located on the western side of the Tararua Range between the Ōhau River to the north and the Makorokio Stream to the south.

== Demographics ==
Muhunoa East locality covers 64.13 km^{2} (24.76 sq mi). It is part of the larger Kimberley statistical area.

Historical population for Muhunoa East locality
| Year | Pop. | ±% p.a. |
|---|---|---|
| 2006 | 84 | — |
| 2013 | 96 | +1.93% |
| 2018 | 96 | +0.00% |
| 2023 | 126 | +5.59% |

Muhunua East had a population of 126 in the 2023 New Zealand census, an increase of 30 people (31.2%) since the 2018 census, and an increase of 30 people (31.2%) since the 2013 census. There were 63 males, 60 females, and 3 people of other genders in 45 dwellings. 2.4% of people identified as LGBTIQ+. The median age was 40.4 years (compared with 38.1 years nationally). There were 30 people (23.8%) aged under 15 years, 18 (14.3%) aged 15 to 29, 57 (45.2%) aged 30 to 64, and 24 (19.0%) aged 65 or older.

People could identify as more than one ethnicity. The results were 88.1% European (Pākehā); 11.9% Māori; 2.4% Asian; 2.4% Middle Eastern, Latin American and African New Zealanders (MELAA); and 4.8% other, which includes people giving their ethnicity as "New Zealander". English was spoken by 92.9%, Māori by 2.4%, and other languages by 7.1%. No language could be spoken by 4.8% (e.g. too young to talk). The percentage of people born overseas was 11.9, compared with 28.8% nationally.

The sole religious affiliation given was 23.8% Christian. People who answered that they had no religion were 61.9%, and 14.3% of people did not answer the census question.

Of those at least 15 years old, 18 (18.8%) people had a bachelor's or higher degree, 57 (59.4%) had a post-high school certificate or diploma, and 24 (25.0%) people exclusively held high school qualifications. The median income was $39,800, compared with $41,500 nationally. 9 people (9.4%) earned over $100,000 compared to 12.1% nationally. The employment status of those at least 15 was 51 (53.1%) full-time, 15 (15.6%) part-time, and 3 (3.1%) unemployed.

=== Kimberley statistical area ===
Kimberley statistical area covers 129.37 km^{2} (49.95 sq mi) from Muhunoa East south to the border of Horowhenua and the Kāpiti Coast District. It had an estimated population of 520 as of June 2025, with a population density of 4.02 people per km^{2}.

Historical population for Kimberley statistical area
| Year | Pop. | ±% p.a. |
|---|---|---|
| 2006 | 306 | — |
| 2013 | 399 | +3.86% |
| 2018 | 447 | +2.30% |
| 2023 | 489 | +1.81% |

Kimberley had a population of 489 in the 2023 New Zealand census, an increase of 42 people (9.4%) since the 2018 census, and an increase of 90 people (22.6%) since the 2013 census. There were 252 males, 237 females, and 3 people of other genders in 183 dwellings. 3.1% of people identified as LGBTIQ+. The median age was 43.5 years (compared with 38.1 years nationally). There were 102 people (20.9%) aged under 15 years, 66 (13.5%) aged 15 to 29, 225 (46.0%) aged 30 to 64, and 96 (19.6%) aged 65 or older.

People could identify as more than one ethnicity. The results were 87.1% European (Pākehā); 17.2% Māori; 1.2% Pasifika; 0.6% Asian; 1.2% Middle Eastern, Latin American and African New Zealanders (MELAA); and 5.5% other, which includes people giving their ethnicity as "New Zealander". English was spoken by 96.9%, Māori by 5.5%, Samoan by 0.6%, and other languages by 5.5%. No language could be spoken by 2.5% (e.g. too young to talk). New Zealand Sign Language was known by 1.2%. The percentage of people born overseas was 14.1, compared with 28.8% nationally.

Religious affiliations were 21.5% Christian, 1.2% Māori religious beliefs, 0.6% New Age, and 1.2% other religions. People who answered that they had no religion were 65.6%, and 9.2% of people did not answer the census question.

Of those at least 15 years old, 75 (19.4%) people had a bachelor's or higher degree, 249 (64.3%) had a post-high school certificate or diploma, and 72 (18.6%) people exclusively held high school qualifications. The median income was $34,800, compared with $41,500 nationally. 48 people (12.4%) earned over $100,000 compared to 12.1% nationally. The employment status of those at least 15 was 186 (48.1%) full-time, 63 (16.3%) part-time, and 9 (2.3%) unemployed.

== Education ==
Muhunoa East School first opened in 1904 in temporary premises as a "side school" to relieve overcrowding at Ohau School. It catered for students up to standard II (now Year 4, about 8 years old). It moved to a permanent building in 1908 and expanded to cover up to standard IV (Year 6). It closed in 1922 due to a falling roll, but reopened in 1926, and continued until January 2006. The school building was destroyed by fire in a suspected arson in 2011.
