= Mangaore =

Settlement in Manawatū-Whanganui, New Zealand

- Rural settlement
- Mangahao Power Station
- Interactive map of Mangaore
- Coordinates: 40.573°S 175.448°E
- Country: New Zealand
- Region: Manawatū-Whanganui region
- Territorial authority: Horowhenua District
- Wards: Miranui General Ward; Horowhenua Māori Ward
- Electorates: Rangitīkei; Te Tai Hauāuru (Māori)

Government
  - Territorial Authority: Horowhenua District Council
  - Regional council: Horizons Regional Council
  - Horowhenua Mayor: Bernie Wanden
  - Rangitīkei MP: Suze Redmayne
  - Te Tai Hauāuru MP: Debbie Ngarewa-Packer

Area
  - Total: 3.94 km^{2} (1.52 sq mi)

Population (June 2025)
  - Total: 90
  - Density: 23/km^{2} (59/sq mi)

Mangaore is a small town in the district of Horowhenua, in the southwestern North Island of New Zealand. It is located 4 kilometres southeast of Shannon.

Mangaore Reserve is a park with several sections, one containing Mangaore Hall, and another with walking tracks in an area called "Snake Gully". The hall is run by a local residents association, and can hold up to 200 people.

The town was the headquarters for the construction of the Mangahao Power Station in 1919–1924.

== Demographics ==
Mangaore is described by Stats NZ as a rural settlement, which covers 3.94 km^{2} (1.52 sq mi). It had an estimated population of 90 as of June 2025, with a population density of 23 people per km^{2}. It is part of the larger Miranui statistical area.

Historical population
Year	Pop.	±% p.a.
2006	81	—
2013	78	−0.54%
2018	78	+0.00%
2023	90	+2.90%

Mangaore had a population of 90 in the 2023 New Zealand census, an increase of 12 people (15.4%) since the 2018 census, and an increase of 12 people (15.4%) since the 2013 census. There were 48 males and 45 females in 33 dwellings. 3.3% of people identified as LGBTIQ+. The median age was 35.5 years (compared with 38.1 years nationally). There were 18 people (20.0%) aged under 15 years, 12 (13.3%) aged 15 to 29, 45 (50.0%) aged 30 to 64, and 12 (13.3%) aged 65 or older.

People could identify as more than one ethnicity. The results were 90.0% European (Pākehā), 33.3% Māori, 6.7% Pasifika, and 3.3% Asian. English was spoken by 100.0%, and Māori by 16.7%. The percentage of people born overseas was 6.7, compared with 28.8% nationally.

Religious affiliations were 13.3% Christian, and 3.3% other religions. People who answered that they had no religion were 76.7%, and 6.7% of people did not answer the census question.

Of those at least 15 years old, 6 (8.3%) people had a bachelor's or higher degree, 45 (62.5%) had a post-high school certificate or diploma, and 21 (29.2%) people exclusively held high school qualifications. The median income was $36,900, compared with $41,500 nationally. 6 people (8.3%) earned over $100,000 compared to 12.1% nationally. The employment status of those at least 15 was 39 (54.2%) full-time, 6 (8.3%) part-time, and 3 (4.2%) unemployed.
