= Shannon, New Zealand =

Town in Manawatū-Whanganui, New Zealand

Shannon Te Maire (Māori)
- Town
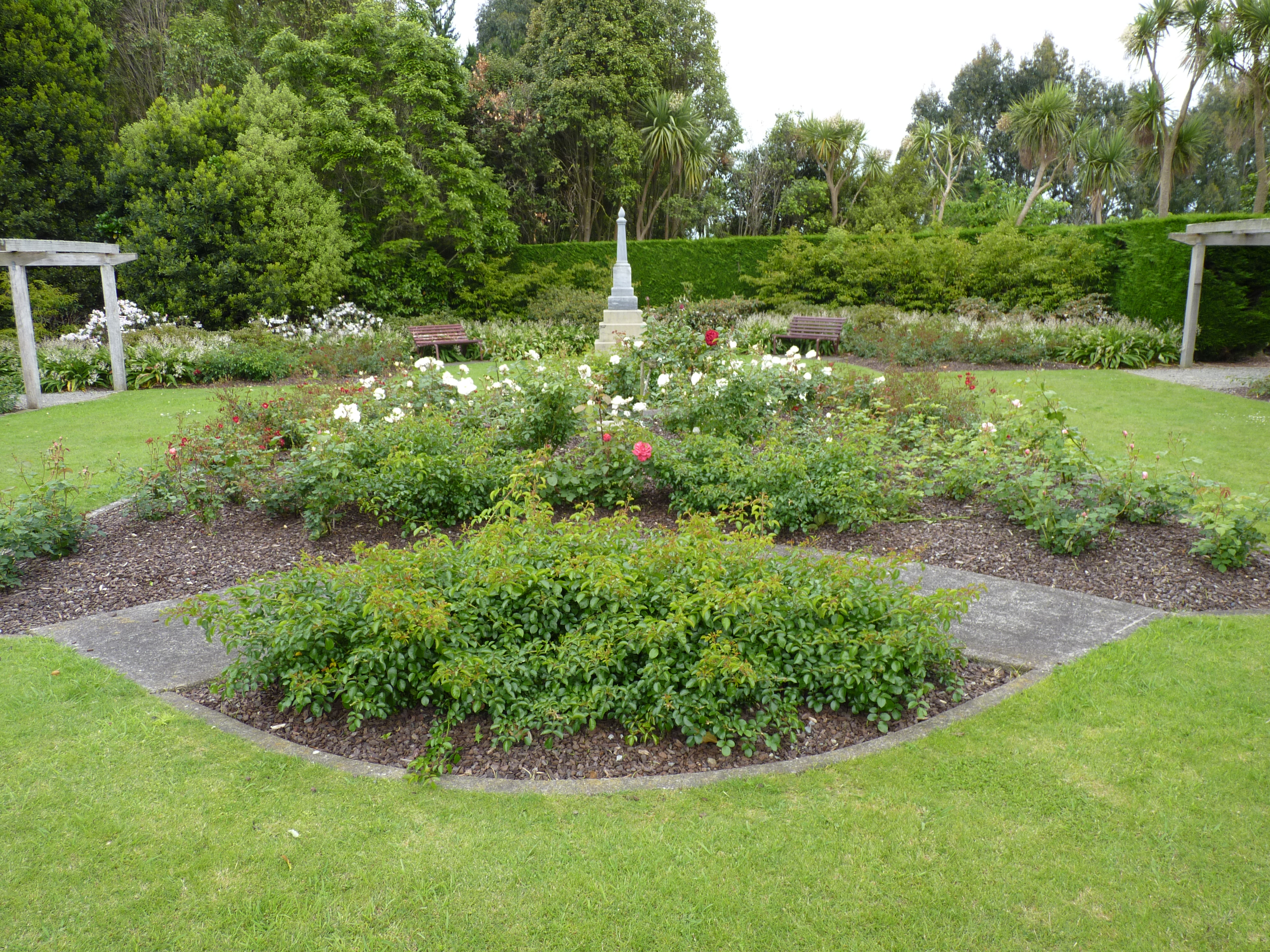
- Te Maire Park
- Interactive map of Shannon
- Coordinates: 40°32′49.92″S 175°24′38.52″E
- Country: New Zealand
- Region: Manawatū-Whanganui region
- Territorial authority: Horowhenua District
- Wards: Miranui General Ward; Horowhenua Māori Ward
- Established: 1887
- Founder: Wellington and Manawatu Railway Company.
- Named for: George Vance Shannon
- Electorates: Rangitīkei; Te Tai Hauāuru (Māori)

Government
  - Territorial Authority: Horowhenua District Council
  - Regional council: Horizons Regional Council
  - Horowhenua Mayor: Bernie Wanden
  - Rangitīkei MP: Suze Redmayne
  - Te Tai Hauāuru MP: Debbie Ngarewa-Packer

Area
  - Total: 2.94 km^{2} (1.14 sq mi)

Population (June 2025)
  - Total: 1,650
  - Density: 561/km^{2} (1,450/sq mi)
- Time zone: UTC+12 (NZST)
  - Summer (DST): UTC+13 (NZDT)
- Postcode: 4821
- Area Code: 06

Shannon (Māori: Te Maire) is a small town in the Horowhenua District of New Zealand's North Island. it is located 28 kilometres southwest of Palmerston North and 15 kilometres northeast of Levin.

The main activities in the district are dairy, sheep, and mixed farming. Mangaore (5 kilometres east) is the residential township for the nearby Mangahao hydro-electric power station, which was the second power station to be built in New Zealand and the first to be built by the government. The power station is the oldest still supplying power to New Zealand grid. The Manawatū River lies to the west of the town.

A large percentage of the population is Māori with the local primary school representing kaupapa Māori.

== History ==
Shannon originally adjoined extensive swamps and was a headquarters for flax milling. The land on which the township later stood was part of an endowment of 215,000 acres (870 km^{2}) acquired about 1881 by the Wellington and Manawatu Railway Company (WMR). At first the company had intended to extend its railway from Levin to Foxton, but afterwards it proceeded to develop and open up the endowment area. Accordingly, the line was laid along the present route via Shannon. The town is considered to have been founded on 8 March 1887 when the first auction of town land was held. Shannon was named after George Vance Shannon (1842–1920), a director of the WMR. It was constituted a borough in 1917.

=== Mangahao Power Station tragedy ===
On 2 July 1922 seven workers were poisoned by carbon monoxide while digging the tunnels for the Mangahao Power Station.

When the extractor fan broke down, Bernard Butler and foreman Alfred Maxwell were killed by suffocation from the fumes being emitted by their oil engines. A subsequent search party of five of their colleagues also suffocated and perished in the tunnel.

== Demographics ==
Shannon is described by Stats NZ as a small urban area, which covers 2.94 km^{2} (1.14 sq mi). It had an estimated population of 1,650 as of June 2025, with a population density of 561 people per km^{2}.

Historical population
Year	Pop.	±% p.a.
2006	1,362	—
2013	1,236	−1.38%
2018	1,398	+2.49%
2023	1,548	+2.06%

Shannon had a population of 1,548 in the 2023 New Zealand census, an increase of 150 people (10.7%) since the 2018 census, and an increase of 312 people (25.2%) since the 2013 census. There were 747 males and 801 females in 567 dwellings. 3.5% of people identified as LGBTIQ+. The median age was 36.8 years (compared with 38.1 years nationally). There were 351 people (22.7%) aged under 15 years, 279 (18.0%) aged 15 to 29, 693 (44.8%) aged 30 to 64, and 228 (14.7%) aged 65 or older.

People could identify as more than one ethnicity. The results were 74.8% European (Pākehā); 43.6% Māori; 4.3% Pasifika; 2.1% Asian; 0.6% Middle Eastern, Latin American and African New Zealanders (MELAA); and 3.9% other, which includes people giving their ethnicity as "New Zealander". English was spoken by 97.1%, Māori by 11.8%, Samoan by 1.0%, and other languages by 4.1%. No language could be spoken by 2.3% (e.g. too young to talk). New Zealand Sign Language was known by 1.4%. The percentage of people born overseas was 8.9, compared with 28.8% nationally.

Religious affiliations were 26.2% Christian, 0.2% Hindu, 0.2% Islam, 1.9% Māori religious beliefs, 0.2% Buddhist, 1.0% New Age, and 1.6% other religions. People who answered that they had no religion were 60.5%, and 9.1% of people did not answer the census question.

Of those at least 15 years old, 129 (10.8%) people had a bachelor's or higher degree, 660 (55.1%) had a post-high school certificate or diploma, and 402 (33.6%) people exclusively held high school qualifications. The median income was $30,800, compared with $41,500 nationally. 42 people (3.5%) earned over $100,000 compared to 12.1% nationally. The employment status of those at least 15 was 519 (43.4%) full-time, 165 (13.8%) part-time, and 72 (6.0%) unemployed.

== Town facilities and attractions ==
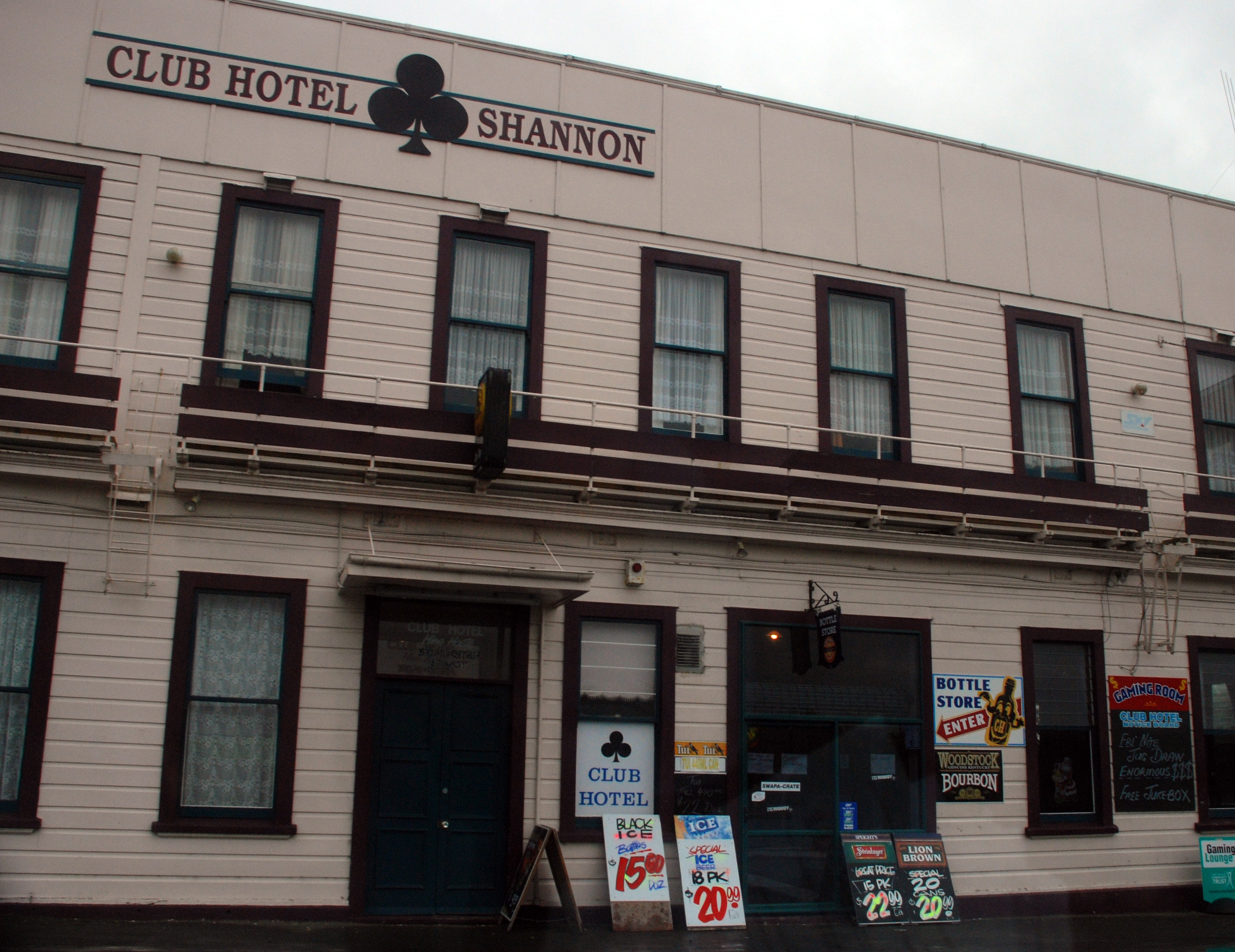
Club Hotel

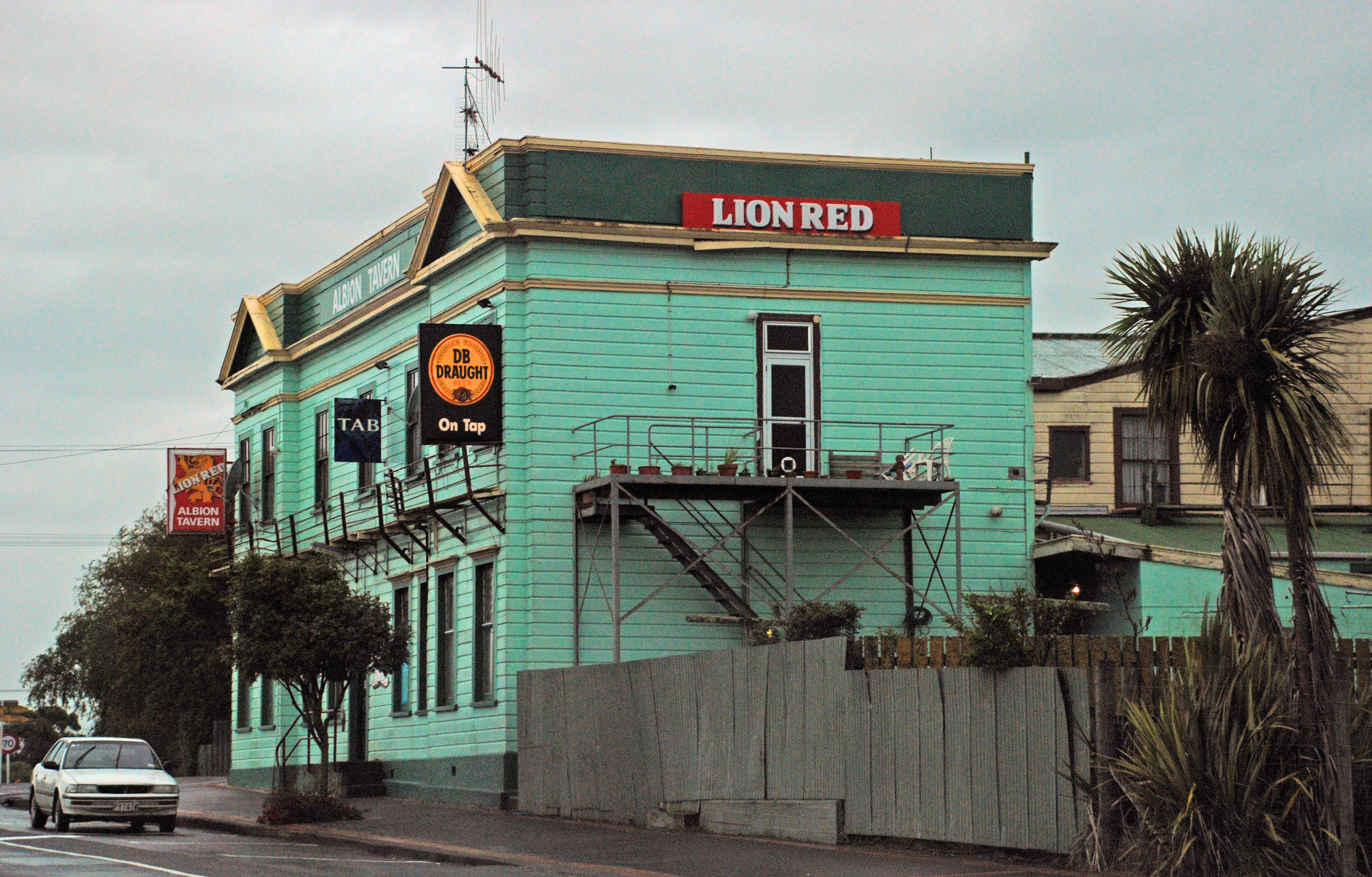
Albion Hotel, which burnt down in 2013

Today Shannon sits as a passing through point between Palmerston North, the Horowhenua, Kapiti and Wellington with public toilet facilities, two cafes, a dairy, an RD1 rural supply store, a fish and chip shop, a primary school, a Four Square grocer, a petrol station and an art gallery.

The township has rugby, netball and lawn bowling clubs.

Shannon Railway Station is the most substantial of only a few remaining physical relics of the WMR, which was acquired by the national New Zealand Railways Department in 1908. The station is a stop for the Capital Connection long distance commuter train between Wellington and Palmerston North.

=== Owlcatraz ===
Owlcatraz was a native bird and wildlife park and one of Shannon's prime attractions. It was opened in 1997 by Ross & Janet Campbell and operated by them until it was sold 23 years later. Owlcatraz had over one million visitors in that time.

=== Helen's town / Flaxville ===
The town used to house the creative work of Helen Pratt which consisted of a large model town with miniature versions of many New Zealand landmarks and buildings, a working train and carnival, all hand made. The display used to be housed at 36 Stout Street until the building was closed in the 1990s.

Helen subsequently built another town. Helen's collection was shown to the public for brief period of time known as Flaxville at 16 Ballance Street. Helen's Collection has left Shannon and was later displayed at Murrayfield, a museum between Shannon and Levin on State 57.

== Education ==
Shannon School is a co-educational state primary school for Year 1 to 8 students, with a roll of 127 as of July 2026. It opened in 1889.

The nearest high schools located in Levin and Foxton both towns are within a 10–16 minute drive offering three high school options, Waiopehu college, Horowhenua college and Manawatū College.

Schools in the nearest major city Palmerston North could also be considered with a short drive ranging from around 20–30 minutes.
