= Waitarere Beach =

Settlement in Manawatū-Whanganui, New Zealand

Waitārere Beach Okatia (Māori)
- Rural settlement
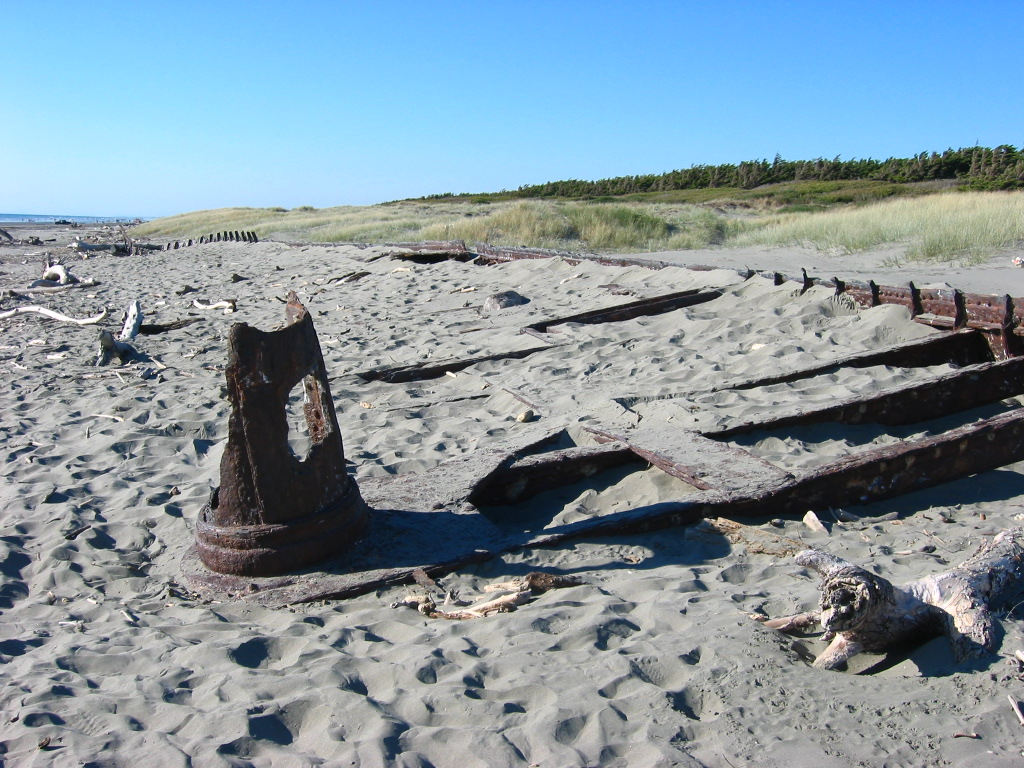
- Remains of the Hydrabad on Waitārere Beach
- Interactive map of Waitārere Beach
- Coordinates: 40.550°S 175.200°E
- Country: New Zealand
- Region: Manawatū-Whanganui region
- Territorial authority: Horowhenua District
- Ward: Waiopehu General Ward; Horowhenua Māori Ward
- Established: 1936
- Electorates: Rangitīkei (electorate); Te Tai Hauāuru (Māori)

Government
  - Territorial Authority: Horowhenua District Council
  - Regional council: Horizons Regional Council
  - Horowhenua Mayor: Bernie Wanden
  - Rangitīkei MP: Suze Redmayne
  - Te Tai Hauāuru MP: Debbie Ngarewa-Packer

Area
  - Total: 5.45 km^{2} (2.10 sq mi)

Population (June 2025)
  - Total: 1,020
  - Density: 187/km^{2} (485/sq mi)
- Postal code: 5510
- Area code: 06
- Website: https://waitarerebeach.net.nz/

Waitārere Beach (Māori: Okatia) is a small settlement in the Horowhenua District of the Manawatū-Whanganui region of New Zealand's North Island. It is located on the South Taranaki Bight, 14 kilometres northwest of Levin, and 17 kilometres southwest of Foxton, both distances being by road.

== Demographics ==
Waitārere Beach is described by Statistics New Zealand as a rural settlement and covers 5.45 km^{2} (2.10 sq mi). It had an estimated population of 1,020 as of June 2025, with a population density of 187 people per km^{2}. It is part of the larger Waitārere statistical area.

Historical population for Waitārere Beach
Year	Pop.	±% p.a.
2006	591	—
2013	609	+0.43%
2018	741	+4.00%
2023	960	+5.32%
The 2006 population is for a smaller area of 1.63 km^{2}. Source:

Waitārere Beach had a population of 960 in the 2023 New Zealand census, an increase of 219 people (29.6%) since the 2018 census, and an increase of 351 people (57.6%) since the 2013 census. There were 477 males, 474 females, and 9 people of other genders in 459 dwellings. 4.4% of people identified as LGBTIQ+. The median age was 55.0 years (compared with 38.1 years nationally). There were 132 people (13.8%) aged under 15 years, 78 (8.1%) aged 15 to 29, 480 (50.0%) aged 30 to 64, and 273 (28.4%) aged 65 or older.

People could identify as more than one ethnicity. The results were 92.2% European (Pākehā); 15.3% Māori; 3.1% Pasifika; 0.9% Asian; 0.3% Middle Eastern, Latin American and African New Zealanders (MELAA); and 3.1% other, which includes people giving their ethnicity as "New Zealander". English was spoken by 97.5%, Māori by 3.8%, Samoan by 0.6%, and other languages by 7.8%. No language could be spoken by 2.2% (e.g. too young to talk). New Zealand Sign Language was known by 0.3%. The percentage of people born overseas was 15.0, compared with 28.8% nationally.

Religious affiliations were 30.6% Christian, 0.6% Māori religious beliefs, 0.9% New Age, 0.3% Jewish, and 0.9% other religions. People who answered that they had no religion were 59.7%, and 7.2% of people did not answer the census question.

Of those at least 15 years old, 189 (22.8%) people had a bachelor's or higher degree, 444 (53.6%) had a post-high school certificate or diploma, and 198 (23.9%) people exclusively held high school qualifications. The median income was $38,800, compared with $41,500 nationally. 96 people (11.6%) earned over $100,000 compared to 12.1% nationally. The employment status of those at least 15 was 357 (43.1%) full-time, 123 (14.9%) part-time, and 18 (2.2%) unemployed.

=== Waitārere ===
Waitārere statistical area, which also includes part of Koputaroa, covers 94.70 km^{2} (36.56 sq mi) and had an estimated population of 2,540 as of June 2025, with a population density of 27 people per km^{2}.

Historical population for Waitārere statistical area
Year	Pop.	±% p.a.
2006	1,875	—
2013	1,875	+0.00%
2018	2,142	+2.70%
2023	2,463	+2.83%

Waitārere had a population of 2,463 in the 2023 New Zealand census, an increase of 321 people (15.0%) since the 2018 census, and an increase of 588 people (31.4%) since the 2013 census. There were 1,233 males, 1,218 females, and 9 people of other genders in 1,035 dwellings. 2.9% of people identified as LGBTIQ+. The median age was 52.7 years (compared with 38.1 years nationally). There were 366 people (14.9%) aged under 15 years, 291 (11.8%) aged 15 to 29, 1,164 (47.3%) aged 30 to 64, and 645 (26.2%) aged 65 or older.

People could identify as more than one ethnicity. The results were 86.7% European (Pākehā); 21.3% Māori; 3.5% Pasifika; 2.8% Asian; 0.5% Middle Eastern, Latin American and African New Zealanders (MELAA); and 2.9% other, which includes people giving their ethnicity as "New Zealander". English was spoken by 97.6%, Māori by 4.9%, Samoan by 0.4%, and other languages by 6.0%. No language could be spoken by 1.5% (e.g. too young to talk). New Zealand Sign Language was known by 0.4%. The percentage of people born overseas was 14.3, compared with 28.8% nationally.

Religious affiliations were 30.0% Christian, 0.1% Hindu, 1.0% Māori religious beliefs, 0.1% Buddhist, 0.6% New Age, 0.1% Jewish, and 0.9% other religions. People who answered that they had no religion were 58.8%, and 8.4% of people did not answer the census question.

Of those at least 15 years old, 375 (17.9%) people had a bachelor's or higher degree, 1,179 (56.2%) had a post-high school certificate or diploma, and 543 (25.9%) people exclusively held high school qualifications. The median income was $38,300, compared with $41,500 nationally. 216 people (10.3%) earned over $100,000 compared to 12.1% nationally. The employment status of those at least 15 was 954 (45.5%) full-time, 327 (15.6%) part-time, and 45 (2.1%) unemployed.

== Climate ==
Climate data for Waitārere Forest (1981–2010 normals, extremes 1962–1989)
Month	Jan	Feb	Mar	Apr	May	Jun	Jul	Aug	Sep	Oct	Nov	Dec	Year
Record high °C (°F)	29.9 (85.8)	29.6 (85.3)	29.7 (85.5)	26.2 (79.2)	22.1 (71.8)	19.6 (67.3)	16.8 (62.2)	20.0 (68.0)	22.5 (72.5)	26.1 (79.0)	27.9 (82.2)	29.5 (85.1)	29.9 (85.8)
Mean daily maximum °C (°F)	21.4 (70.5)	21.9 (71.4)	20.5 (68.9)	18.0 (64.4)	15.7 (60.3)	13.4 (56.1)	12.7 (54.9)	13.6 (56.5)	15.0 (59.0)	16.1 (61.0)	17.9 (64.2)	20.0 (68.0)	17.2 (62.9)
Daily mean °C (°F)	17.3 (63.1)	17.3 (63.1)	15.7 (60.3)	13.1 (55.6)	11.1 (52.0)	9.1 (48.4)	8.2 (46.8)	9.0 (48.2)	10.8 (51.4)	12.2 (54.0)	13.7 (56.7)	16.0 (60.8)	12.8 (55.0)
Mean daily minimum °C (°F)	13.2 (55.8)	12.7 (54.9)	10.8 (51.4)	8.1 (46.6)	6.6 (43.9)	4.9 (40.8)	3.7 (38.7)	4.4 (39.9)	6.5 (43.7)	8.3 (46.9)	9.6 (49.3)	12.0 (53.6)	8.4 (47.1)
Record low °C (°F)	2.0 (35.6)	1.0 (33.8)	−0.8 (30.6)	−2.4 (27.7)	−5.0 (23.0)	−6.5 (20.3)	−5.0 (23.0)	−5.2 (22.6)	−3.3 (26.1)	−4.1 (24.6)	−0.6 (30.9)	1.7 (35.1)	−6.5 (20.3)
Average rainfall mm (inches)	61.8 (2.43)	53.8 (2.12)	65.9 (2.59)	54.8 (2.16)	100.5 (3.96)	86.1 (3.39)	101.7 (4.00)	73.3 (2.89)	74.8 (2.94)	71.8 (2.83)	55.7 (2.19)	81.2 (3.20)	881.4 (34.7)
Source: NIWA (rainfall 1971–2000)

== Lord of the Rings location ==
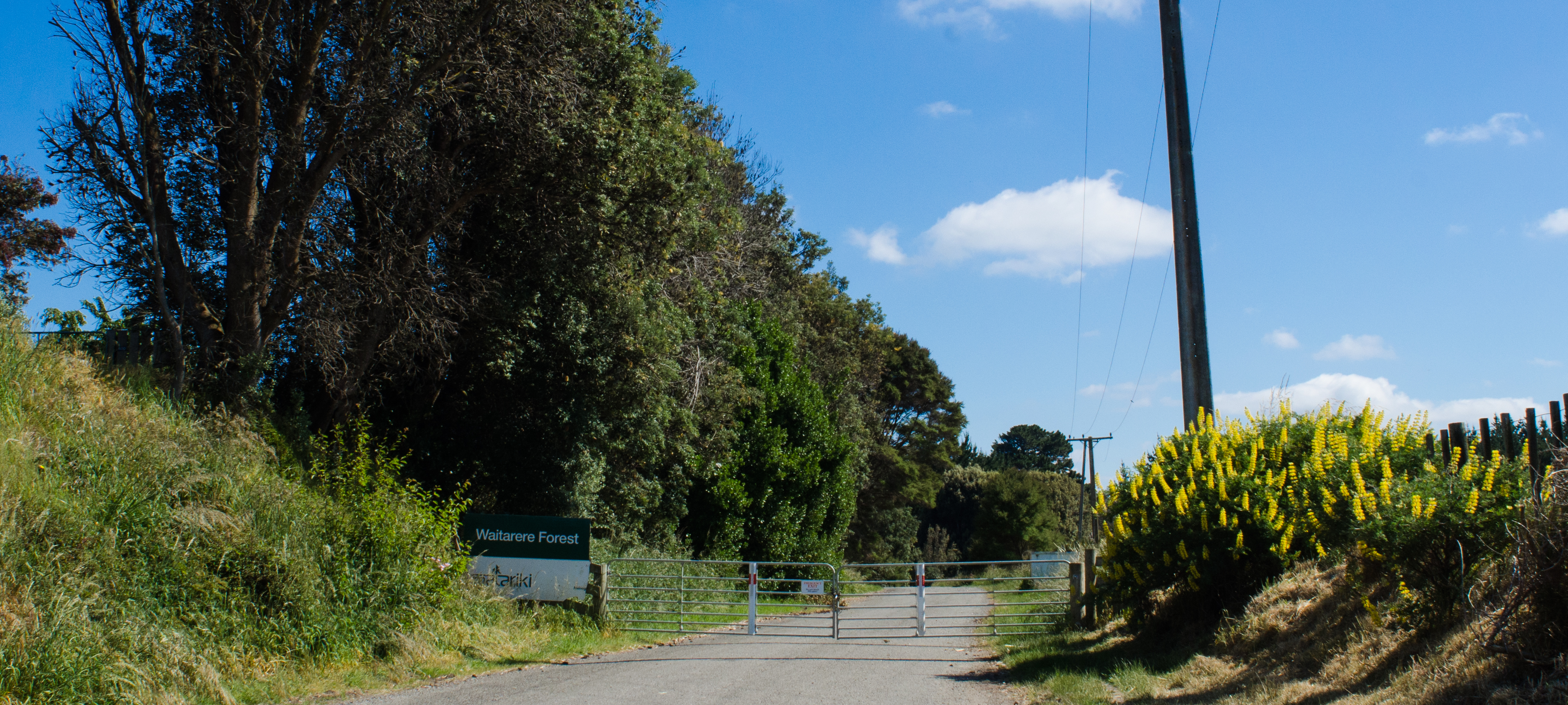
Waitārere Forest

The Waitārere Forest was used as the location of Trollshaw Forest and Osgiliath Wood in The Lord of the Rings Trilogy.

== Hydrabad wreck ==
The Hydrabad (1865-1878) was a Scottish cargo vessel that travelled between Australia, England and India, serving for ten shipments before crashing onto Waitārere Beach 600 meters away from the township in 1878 during an intense storm that damaged the ship.

As of 2024, it has been nearly completely buried due to growing dunes. A blue marker has been rooted to indicate its location.

== Four Square Waitārere ==
The Waitārere Four Square is the only grocery store at Waitārere Beach. In 2008, it was rebuilt following a fire. It also serves as the local NZ Post shop.

== Gifts at Waitarere ==
Gifts at Waitarere is a gift shop at Waitārere Beach that opened in 2016.

== Waitarere Beach Surf Life Saving Club ==
The Levin Waitārere Surf Life Saving Club was established to provide patrol services to Waitārere Beach. A new purpose-built building was opened in 2023. It is part of Surf Life Saving New Zealand.

== Waitarere Progressive Association ==
The Waitarere Beach Progressive & Ratepayers Association (formerly, the Waitarere Beach Progressive Association), is a local community organisation founded in 1938, but renamed in 1945. It publishes a newsletter periodically with local community updates. They hold an annual general meeting once a year which is open to the wider community, but only members can vote.

== Waitarere Rise Reserve Society ==
The Waitarere Rise Reserve Society Inc. (WRRSI) is a community organisation composed of residents of the Waitarere Rise Subdivision located at Waitārere Beach. It holds an annual general meeting once a year which is open to the wider community. All residents of the Waitarere Rise are eligible to join the organisation. The organisation holds regular events which are posted on their website.
