= Levin, New Zealand =

Town in Manawatū-Whanganui, New Zealand

Levin Taitoko (Māori)
- Secondary urban area
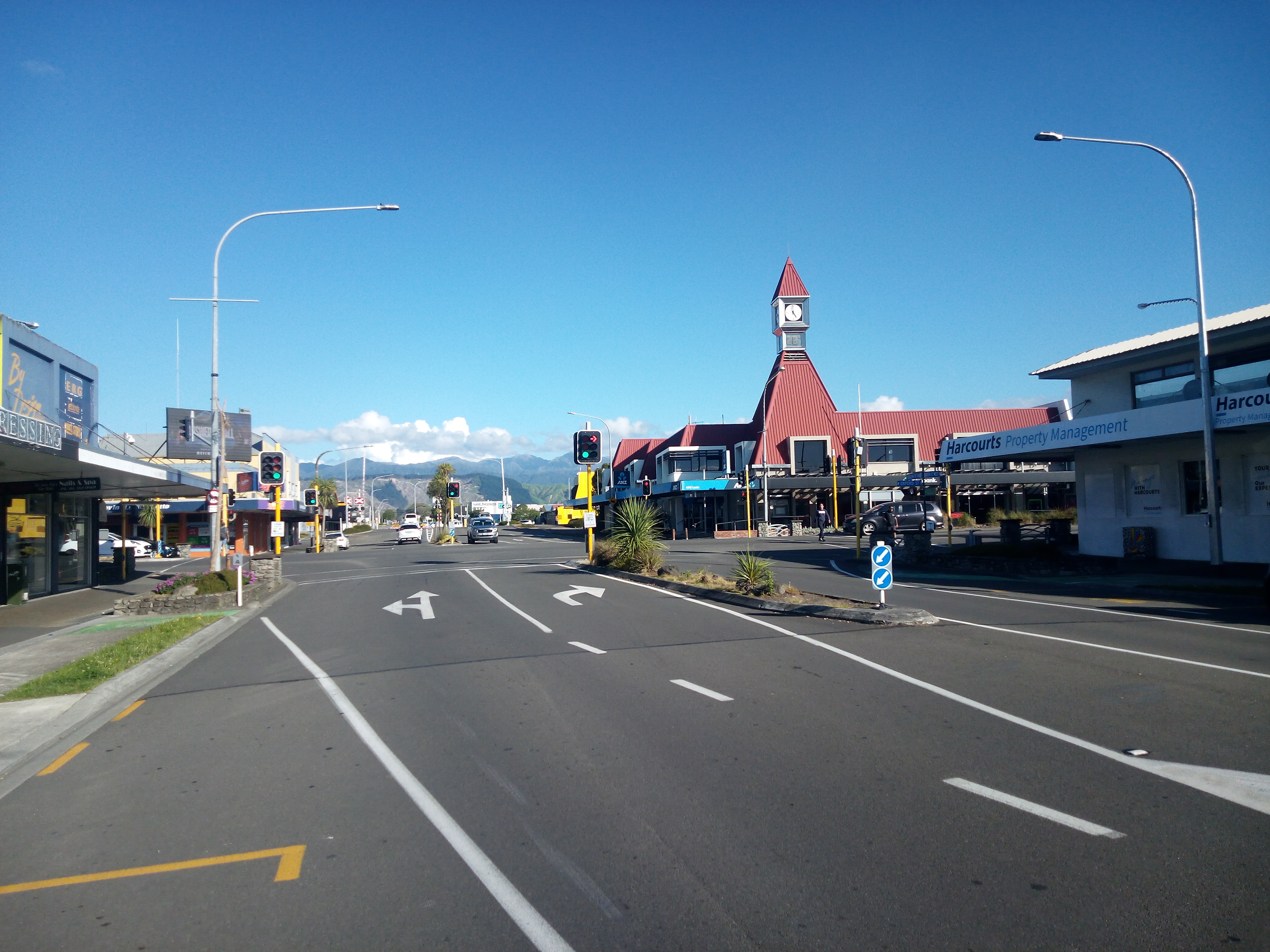
- Intersection of Queen and Oxford Streets
- Interactive map of Levin
- Coordinates: 40°37′19″S 175°17′12″E
- Country: New Zealand
- Region: Manawatū-Whanganui
- Territorial authority: Horowhenua District
- Wards: Levin General Ward; Waiopehu General Ward; Horowhenua Māori Ward
- Named for: William Hort Levin
- Electorates: Rangitīkei (electorate); Te Tai Hauāuru (Māori)

Government
  - Territorial Authority: Horowhenua District Council
  - Regional council: Horizons Regional Council
  - Horowhenua Mayor: Bernie Wanden
  - Rangitīkei MP: Suze Redmayne
  - Te Tai Hauāuru MP: Debbie Ngarewa-Packer

Area
  - Urban: 22.91 km^{2} (8.85 sq mi)

Population (June 2025)
  - Urban: 20,500
  - Urban density: 895/km^{2} (2,320/sq mi)
- Postcode: 5510
- Area code: 06

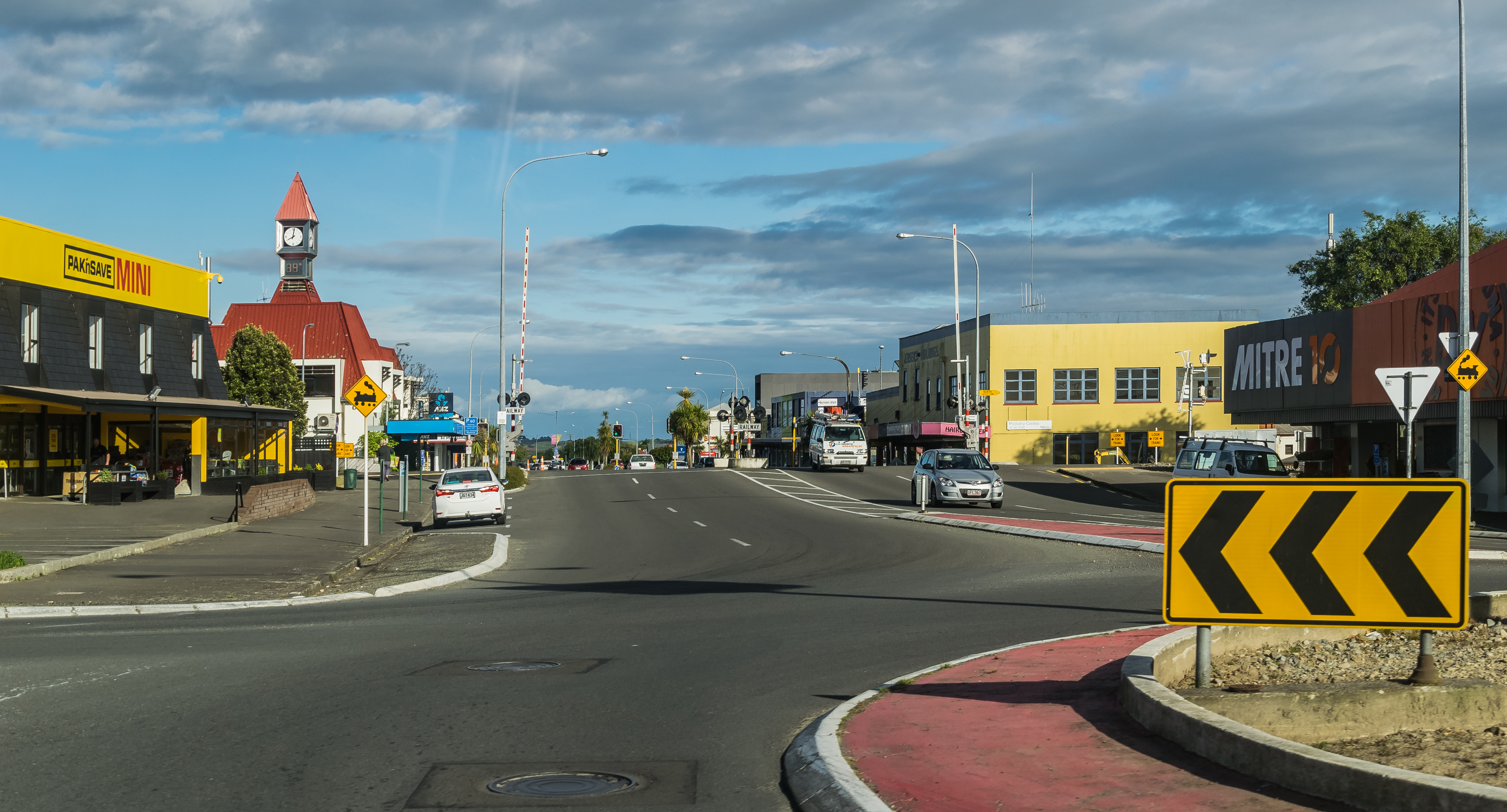
Queen Street, with the clock tower visible on the left

Levin (/ləˈvɪn/; Māori: Taitoko) is the largest town and seat of the Horowhenua District, in the Manawatū-Whanganui region of New Zealand's North Island. It is located east of Lake Horowhenua, around 95 km (59 mi) north of Wellington and 50 km (31 mi) southwest of Palmerston North.

The town has a population of 20,500 (June 2025), making it the 30th largest urban area in New Zealand, and third largest in Manawatū-Whanganui behind Palmerston North and Whanganui.

Levin is a service centre for the surrounding rural area, and a centre for light manufacturing.

To the west of the main town lies Lake Horowhenua, which covers some 3.9 km^{2} (1.5 sq mi). It is currently undergoing regeneration.

== History ==
=== 19th century ===
The area now occupied by Levin was connected to both Wellington and Palmerston North by railway in 1886. The area was surveyed in 1888, and European settlement began following the sale of suburban and rural sections, which commenced on 19 March 1889.

The town was named after William Hort Levin, a director of the Wellington and Manawatu Railway Company.

The name is a variation of the Jewish clan name Levi. Unlike the usual pronunciation of the surname, stress is placed on the second syllable of the word. William Hort Levin's great-grandson, Peter Levin, claims his forebear would have pronounced his surname as Levene, and that this pronunciation was in common use for many years and is always used by the family.

=== 20th century—present ===
Levin was made a borough in 1906.

The Levin clock tower was built in 1999 as a donation by the Levin Rotary Club after some fundraising. It was described as "iconic" to the town by the Manawatū Standard. It has four clocks, one for every side, each with an independent motor, and has a temperature gauge.

=== 2024 car rally ===
On Saturday, 1 June 2024 a car rally locally known as "the Levin car invasion" took place. With 200 cars and 500 people in attendance, they started at the intersection of Queen Street and State Highway 57 before the police removed them. The convoy then moved to Miro Street in Ōtaki before returning to Levin, now at the intersection of State Highway 1 and Queen Street. Once they arrived back in Levin, the Police tried to stop the group however the police were attacked. In an interview the "organizer" said "What we're doing is illegal, but until we get a proper skid pad or somewhere safe to do it we're going to keep doing it on the streets."

== Marae ==
Kawiu Marae and Te Huia o Raukura meeting house, located just north of the town, are a meeting place for Muaūpoko.

In October 2020, the Government committed $945,445 from the Provincial Growth Fund to upgrade Kawiu Marae and nearby Kohuturoa Marae, creating 50 jobs.

== Demographics ==
Levin is described by Stats NZ as a medium urban area, which covers 22.91 km^{2} (8.85 sq mi). It had an estimated population of 20,500 as of June 2025, with a population density of 895 people per km^{2}.

Historical population
Year	Pop.	±% p.a.
2006	15,972	—
2013	16,254	+0.25%
2018	17,775	+1.81%
2023	19,533	+1.90%
The 2006 population is for a smaller area of 22.43 km^{2}. Source:

Levin had a population of 19,533 in the 2023 New Zealand census, an increase of 1,758 people (9.9%) since the 2018 census, and an increase of 3,279 people (20.2%) since the 2013 census. There were 9,303 males, 10,158 females, and 72 people of other genders in 7,578 dwellings. 2.9% of people identified as LGBTIQ+. The median age was 43.7 years (compared with 38.1 years nationally). There were 3,633 people (18.6%) aged under 15 years, 3,345 (17.1%) aged 15 to 29, 7,359 (37.7%) aged 30 to 64, and 5,196 (26.6%) aged 65 or older.

People could identify as more than one ethnicity. The results were 74.8% European (Pākehā); 29.2% Māori; 10.2% Pasifika; 6.1% Asian; 0.8% Middle Eastern, Latin American and African New Zealanders (MELAA); and 2.0% other, which includes people giving their ethnicity as "New Zealander". English was spoken by 96.2%, Māori by 6.0%, Samoan by 3.1%, and other languages by 7.4%. No language could be spoken by 2.0% (e.g. too young to talk). New Zealand Sign Language was known by 0.7%. The percentage of people born overseas was 16.6, compared with 28.8% nationally.

Religious affiliations were 34.1% Christian, 1.0% Hindu, 0.3% Islam, 1.4% Māori religious beliefs, 0.4% Buddhist, 0.6% New Age, 0.1% Jewish, and 1.0% other religions. People who answered that they had no religion were 52.7%, and 8.7% of people did not answer the census question.

Of those at least 15 years old, 1,680 (10.6%) people had a bachelor's or higher degree, 8,724 (54.9%) had a post-high school certificate or diploma, and 5,499 (34.6%) people exclusively held high school qualifications. The median income was $29,600, compared with $41,500 nationally. 663 people (4.2%) earned over $100,000 compared to 12.1% nationally. The employment status of those at least 15 was 6,207 (39.0%) full-time, 1,824 (11.5%) part-time, and 612 (3.8%) unemployed.

Individual statistical areas
Name	Area (km^{2})	Population	Density (per km^{2})	Dwellings	Median age	Median income
Donnelly Park	1.90	1,317	693	477	43.4 years	$30,400
Kawiu South	1.02	2,553	2,505	969	40.9 years	$32,700
Makomako	0.86	1,467	1,706	570	40.9 years	$31,700
Kawiu North	1.76	1,962	1,115	726	46.2 years	$35,400
Levin Central	1.05	1,161	1,106	525	47.7 years	$27,200
Tararua	11.23	1,857	165	831	62.3 years	$27,200
Queenwood	0.83	2,208	2,660	918	44.9 years	$27,900
Playford Park	0.85	1,845	2,171	729	37.6 years	$31,300
Fairfield	1.74	1,590	914	594	45.0 years	$29,900
Taitoko	0.92	2,025	2,201	675	34.3 years	$28,100
Waiopehu	0.76	1,554	2,045	561	39.0 years	$29,500
New Zealand					38.1 years	$41,500

== Economy ==
=== Retail ===
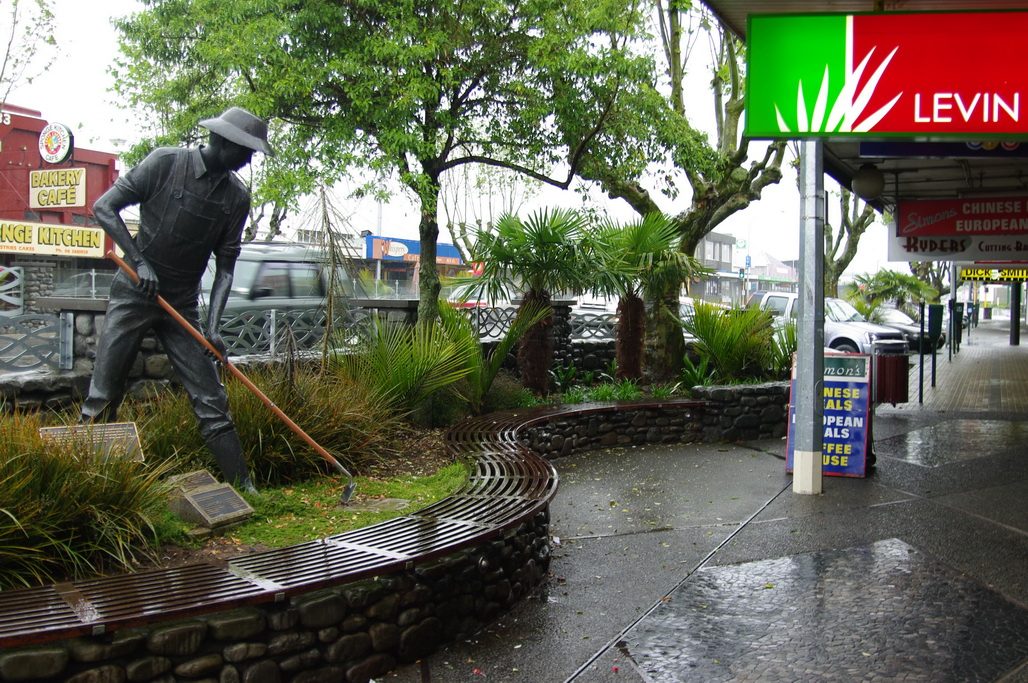
Levin Mall

The Levin Mall covers 791 m^{2}, with 14 retailers including a Farmers department store.

== Transport ==
Levin lies on State Highway 1, which forms the town's main street, Oxford Street. State Highway 57 forms the eastern boundary of the town, and meets State Highway 1 between Levin and the Ohau River, Wellington.

Levin is on the North Island Main Trunk with a station used by the Capital Connection long distance commuter train between Wellington and Palmerston North. It is also served by 8 InterCity buses a day each way.

Buses run for shoppers to Waikanae on Tuesdays and Thursdays and on Fridays to Shannon, Foxton Beach, Foxton and Waitarere Beach. A commuter bus runs via Foxton to Palmerston North.

== Schools ==
There are nine schools in the Levin urban area:

- Fairfield School is a state full primary (Year 1–8) school with a roll of 387. It opened in 1963.
- Horowhenua College is a state secondary (Year 9–13) school with a roll of 885. It opened in 1940, replacing the secondary department of Levin District High School, which opened in 1905.
- Levin East School is a state contributing primary (Year 1–6) school with a roll of 398. It opened in 1953.
- Levin Intermediate is a state intermediate (Year 7–8) school with a roll of 278. It opened in 1971.
- Levin North School is a state contributing primary (Year 1–6) school with a roll of 240. It opened in 1954.
- Levin School is a state contributing primary (Year 1–6) school with a roll of 256. It opened in 1890. In 1903 it merged with Horowhenua School (which began in 1894 as State Farm School) on a new site. Secondary education was added in 1905, and it became Levin District High School. When Horowhenua College opened in 1940, it went back to being a primary school.
- St Joseph's School is a state-integrated Catholic full primary (Year 1–8) school with a roll of 184. It opened in 1920.
- Taitoko School is a state full primary (Year 1–8) school with a roll of 242. It opened in 1969.
- Waiopehu College is a state secondary (Year 9–13) school.It opened in 1973 and has a roll of 570. It opened in 1973.

All these schools are co-educational. Rolls are as of July 2026,

== Notable people ==
- Darren Hughes – politician
- David Lomax – rugby league player
- Dean Kent – Olympic and Commonwealth Games swimmer
- Doug Kidd – politician
- Codie Taylor – rugby union player
- Carlos Spencer – rugby union player
- Cathryn Finlayson – hockey player
- Frank Weitzel – printmaker and sculptor
- George Silk – photographer, LIFE magazine
- Jack Afamasaga – rugby league player
- James Tamou – rugby league player
- Janet Newman - poetry author
- Jaxon Evans – racing driver
- Joy Cowley – novelist
- Johnny Lomax – rugby league player
- Frank Weitzel – printmaker and sculptor
- Matthew Saunoa – New Zealand Idol winner 2006
- Nathan Guy – politician
- Nicky Hager – author
- Sir Paul Beresford – British politician
- Rebecca Gibney – actress
- Richard Sylvan – philosopher and logician
- Roger Twose – cricketer
- Sonny Whakarau – rugby league player
- Suzy Clarkson – newsreader

== Climate ==
Climate data for Levin (1991–2020 normals, extremes 1895–present)
Month	Jan	Feb	Mar	Apr	May	Jun	Jul	Aug	Sep	Oct	Nov	Dec	Year
Record high °C (°F)	32.6 (90.7)	31.1 (88.0)	31.0 (87.8)	28.7 (83.7)	24.3 (75.7)	20.6 (69.1)	21.0 (69.8)	20.5 (68.9)	23.0 (73.4)	26.1 (79.0)	27.8 (82.0)	29.7 (85.5)	32.6 (90.7)
Mean maximum °C (°F)	27.2 (81.0)	26.8 (80.2)	25.7 (78.3)	22.9 (73.2)	20.1 (68.2)	17.4 (63.3)	16.4 (61.5)	17.1 (62.8)	18.9 (66.0)	20.6 (69.1)	22.7 (72.9)	25.3 (77.5)	28.5 (83.3)
Mean daily maximum °C (°F)	22.1 (71.8)	22.6 (72.7)	21.1 (70.0)	18.5 (65.3)	16.0 (60.8)	13.6 (56.5)	13.1 (55.6)	13.8 (56.8)	15.0 (59.0)	16.3 (61.3)	18.0 (64.4)	20.3 (68.5)	17.5 (63.6)
Daily mean °C (°F)	17.7 (63.9)	18.0 (64.4)	16.3 (61.3)	13.9 (57.0)	11.8 (53.2)	9.5 (49.1)	8.8 (47.8)	9.6 (49.3)	11.1 (52.0)	12.6 (54.7)	14.0 (57.2)	16.3 (61.3)	13.3 (55.9)
Mean daily minimum °C (°F)	13.3 (55.9)	13.4 (56.1)	11.6 (52.9)	9.3 (48.7)	7.5 (45.5)	5.3 (41.5)	4.5 (40.1)	5.4 (41.7)	7.1 (44.8)	8.9 (48.0)	10.0 (50.0)	12.3 (54.1)	9.1 (48.3)
Mean minimum °C (°F)	6.0 (42.8)	6.2 (43.2)	4.7 (40.5)	2.2 (36.0)	0.5 (32.9)	−1.5 (29.3)	−1.7 (28.9)	−1.0 (30.2)	−0.3 (31.5)	1.5 (34.7)	2.6 (36.7)	5.1 (41.2)	−2.4 (27.7)
Record low °C (°F)	−0.2 (31.6)	0.0 (32.0)	−0.6 (30.9)	−1.1 (30.0)	−3.9 (25.0)	−4.4 (24.1)	−5.4 (22.3)	−5.3 (22.5)	−3.3 (26.1)	−2.2 (28.0)	0.0 (32.0)	0.0 (32.0)	−5.4 (22.3)
Average rainfall mm (inches)	66.0 (2.60)	80.5 (3.17)	65.7 (2.59)	84.6 (3.33)	91.3 (3.59)	102.0 (4.02)	93.8 (3.69)	88.6 (3.49)	95.3 (3.75)	96.6 (3.80)	90.3 (3.56)	99.2 (3.91)	1,053.9 (41.5)
Source: NIWA
