= Horowhenua District =

- Territorial authority district
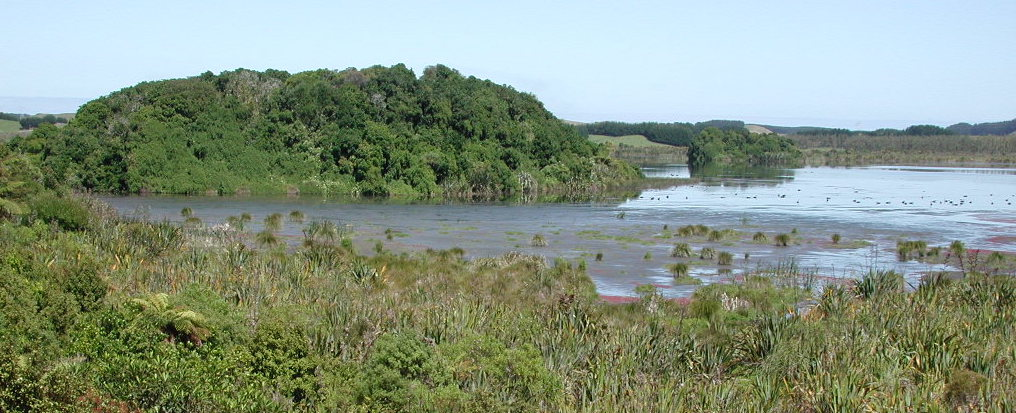
- Lake Papaitonga

- Horowhenua district within the North Island
- Coordinates: 40°35′20″S 175°20′35″E
- Country: New Zealand
- Region: Manawatū-Whanganui
- Wards: Levin; Waiopehu; Miranui; Kere Kere; Horowhenua Māori
- Seat: Levin

Government
  - Mayor: Bernie Wanden
  - Deputy Mayor: Jo Mason
  - Territorial authority: Horowhenua District Council

Area
  - Total: 1,063.91 km^{2} (410.78 sq mi)

Population (June 2025)
  - Total: 38,400
  - Density: 36.1/km^{2} (93.5/sq mi)
- Time zone: UTC+12 (NZST)
  - Summer (DST): UTC+13 (NZDT)
- Postcode(s): Map of postcodes
- Website: www.horowhenua.govt.nz

Horowhenua District is a territorial authority district on the west coast of the North Island of New Zealand, administered by Horowhenua District Council. Located north of Wellington and Kāpiti, it stretches from slightly north of the town of Ōtaki in the south to just south of Himatangi in the north, and from the coast to the top of the Tararua Range. It is in the Manawatū-Whanganui local government region. The name Horowhenua is Māori for landslide.

Levin is the main town and the seat of the Horowhenua District Council. Other towns include Foxton, Shannon and Tokomaru. The population of the district is 38,400 (June 2025).

== History ==
Horowhenua County was established in 1885 from the southern part of Manawatu County. It stretched from the Manawatū River, Opiki and Tokomaru in the north, to Waikanae and the Waikanae River in the south. The county offices were in Ōtaki until 1896, when they were moved to Levin.

Horowhenua District was established in 1989 from a merger of Horowhenua County, Foxton Borough, Levin Borough and part of the first Manawatū District, as part of New Zealand local government reforms. The southern part of Horowhenua County – the Waikanae and Otaki areas – became part of Kāpiti Coast District.

== Populated places ==
Horowhenua District consists of the following towns, localities, settlements and communities (larger towns shown in bold):

- Kere Kere Ward:
  - **Foxton**
  - **Foxton Beach**
  - Moutua
- Levin Ward:
  - **Levin**
  - Weraroa
- Miranu Ward:
  - Makerua
  - Mangaore
  - Opiki
  - **Shannon**
  - Tokomaru
- Waiopehu Ward:
  - Gladstone
  - Heatherlea
  - Hokio Beach
  - Ihakara
  - Koputaroa
  - Kuku
  - Makahika
  - Manakau
  - Muhunoa
  - Muhunoa East
  - Ōhau
  - Poroutawhao
  - Waikawa Beach
  - Waitarere Beach

== Demographics ==
Horowhenua District covers 1,063.91 km^{2} (410.78 sq mi) and had an estimated population of 38,400 as of June 2025, with a population density of 36 people per km^{2}.

Historical population
Year	Pop.	±% p.a.
2006	29,868	—
2013	30,096	+0.11%
2018	33,261	+2.02%
2023	36,693	+1.98%

Horowhenua District had a population of 36,693 in the 2023 New Zealand census, an increase of 3,432 people (10.3%) since the 2018 census, and an increase of 6,597 people (21.9%) since the 2013 census. There were 17,904 males, 18,660 females and 129 people of other genders in 14,418 dwellings. 2.9% of people identified as LGBTIQ+. The median age was 45.5 years (compared with 38.1 years nationally). There were 6,624 people (18.1%) aged under 15 years, 5,838 (15.9%) aged 15 to 29, 15,090 (41.1%) aged 30 to 64, and 9,141 (24.9%) aged 65 or older.

People could identify as more than one ethnicity. The results were 79.3% European (Pākehā); 27.7% Māori; 7.3% Pasifika; 4.9% Asian; 0.6% Middle Eastern, Latin American and African New Zealanders (MELAA); and 2.4% other, which includes people giving their ethnicity as "New Zealander". English was spoken by 96.8%, Māori language by 5.8%, Samoan by 1.9% and other languages by 6.5%. No language could be spoken by 2.0% (e.g. too young to talk). New Zealand Sign Language was known by 0.7%. The percentage of people born overseas was 15.0, compared with 28.8% nationally.

Religious affiliations were 31.2% Christian, 0.6% Hindu, 0.2% Islam, 1.3% Māori religious beliefs, 0.4% Buddhist, 0.6% New Age, 0.1% Jewish, and 1.0% other religions. People who answered that they had no religion were 56.3%, and 8.6% of people did not answer the census question.

Of those at least 15 years old, 2,904 (9.7%) people had a bachelor's or higher degree, 16,785 (55.8%) had a post-high school certificate or diploma, and 9,531 (31.7%) people exclusively held high school qualifications. The median income was $31,700, compared with $41,500 nationally. 1,815 people (6.0%) earned over $100,000 compared to 12.1% nationally. The employment status of those at least 15 was that 12,774 (42.5%) people were employed full-time, 3,861 (12.8%) were part-time, and 996 (3.3%) were unemployed.

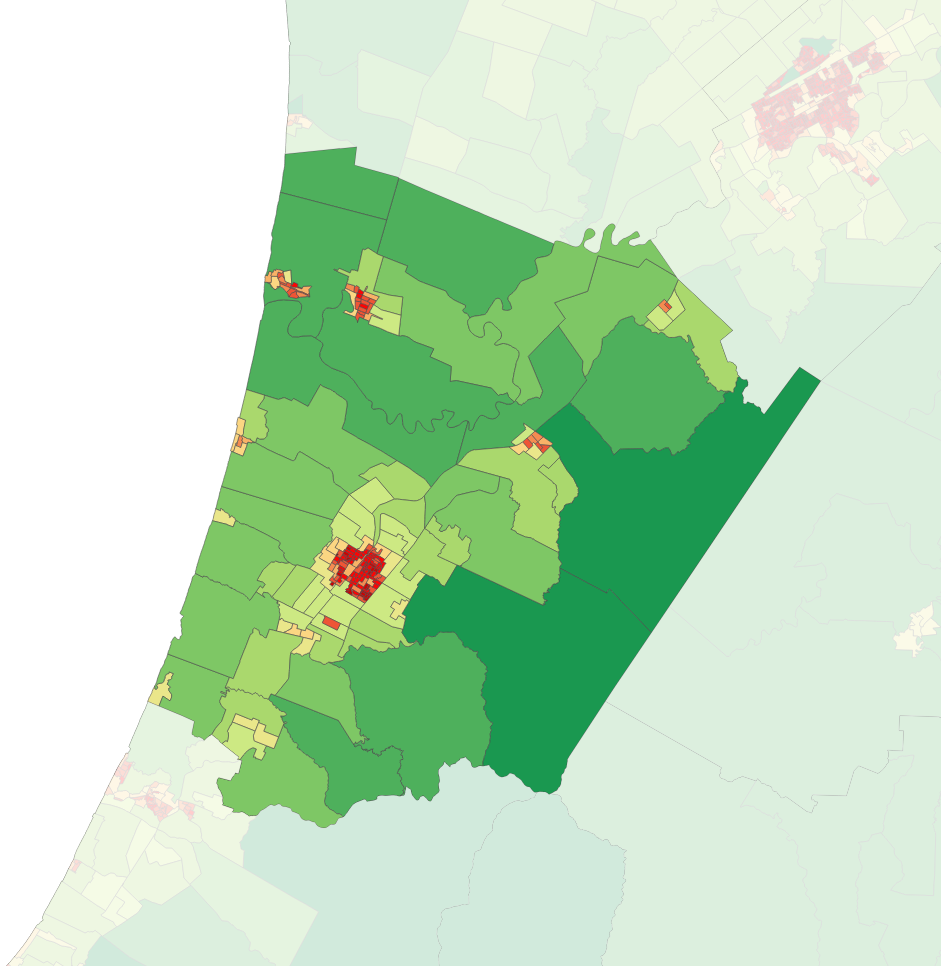
Population density in the 2023 census

Individual wards
Name	Area (km^{2})	Population	Density (per km^{2})	Dwellings	Median age	Median income
Kere Kere General Ward	198.29	6,351	32	2,595	48.3 years	$31,400
Miranui General Ward	299.82	3,444	11	1,236	35.9 years	$38,200
Levin General Ward	19.64	18,735	954	7,119	41.6 years	$30,300
Waiopehu General Ward	546.15	8,160	15	3,468	53.9 years	$33,400
New Zealand					38.1 years	$41,500

== Economy ==
The Horowhenua District has a modelled gross domestic product (GDP) of $1,409 million in the year to March 2024, 0.3% of New Zealand's national GDP. The GDP per capita is $36,806, ranking fourth-lowest out of 66 territorial authorities.

== Land use ==
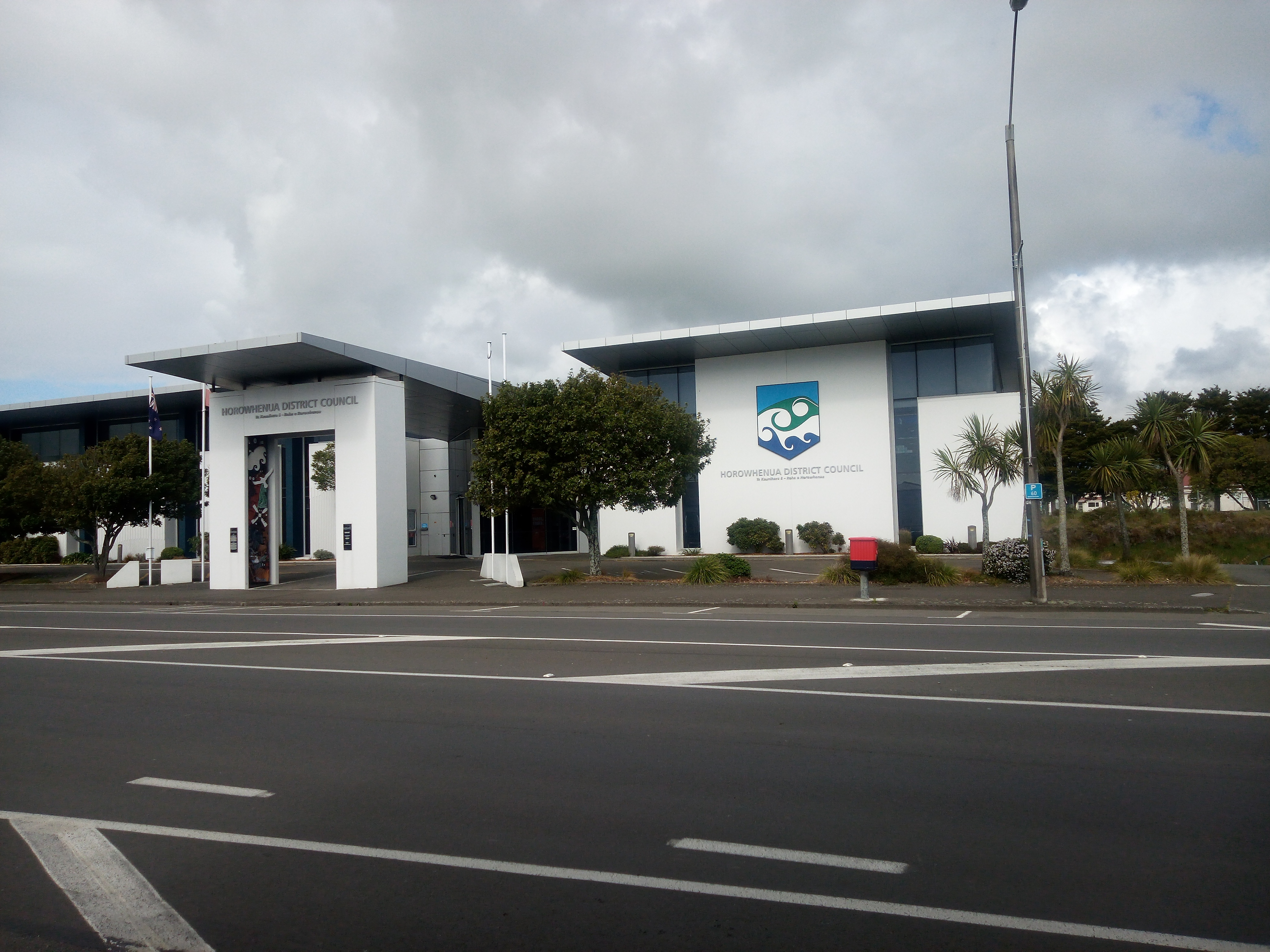
The Horowhenua District Council Building in Levin.

Much of the area was once an extensive wetland and the centre of a substantial flax industry. It has been progressively drained and converted to productive but flood-prone farmland, with a mixture of loam and peat based soils. Some parts of the wetland, particularly those around Lake Horowhenua are being returned to their former state as a conservation area, with the help of local Māori. One of the local tribal authorities is the Muaūpoko Tribal Authority.

== Museums ==
- Te Awahou Nieuwe Stroom – Foxton
- Piriharakeke Generation Inspiration Centre – Foxton
- Oranjehof Dutch Connection Centre – Foxton
- Flax Stripper Museum – Foxton
- MAVTech – Museum of Audiovisual Technology – Foxton

== Schools ==
Secondary:

- Manawatū College, Foxton
- Horowhenua College, Levin
- Waiopehu College, Levin

Primary:

- Foxton Beach School, Foxton Beach
- Coley Street School, Foxton
- Foxton Primary, Foxton
- St. Marys, Foxton
- Levin East School, Levin
- Fairfield School, Levin
- Ohau School, Ohau (Levin Rural)
- Koputuroa School, Levin Rural
- St. Josephs, Levin
- Levin School, Levin
- Levin North School, Levin
- Taitoko School, Levin
- Poroutawhao School, Levin Rural
- Shannon School, Shannon
- Manakau School, Manakau
- Opiki School, Opiki
- Tokomaru School, Tokomaru

Intermediate:

- Levin Intermediate, Levin

== Sport ==
In rugby, a combined Horowhenua-Kapiti team represents the area in the amateur Heartland Championship.

In cricket, a Horowhenua-Kapiti team has competed in the Hawke Cup since 2002.
