= Manawatū-Whanganui =

Region of North Island, New Zealand

- Region
- Manawatū-Whanganui within New Zealand
- Coordinates: 39.6°S 175.6°E
- Country: New Zealand
- Island: North Island
- Established: 1989
- Seat: Palmerston North
- Territorial authorities: List: Palmerston North City; Manawatū District; Horowhenua District; Tararua District; Rangitikei District; Whanganui District; Ruapehu District; Stratford District (part); Waitomo District (part); Taupō District (part)

Government
  - Body: Horizons Regional Council
  - Chair: Nikki Riley
  - Deputy Chair: Fiona Gordon

Area
  - Land: 22,220.64 km^{2} (8,579.44 sq mi)
- Highest elevation: 2,797 m (9,177 ft)
- Lowest elevation: 0 m (0 ft)

Population (June 2025)
  - Region: 260,700
  - Density: 11.73/km^{2} (30.39/sq mi)

GDP
  - Total: NZ$14.328 billion (2021) (7th)
  - Per capita: NZ$55,665 (2021)
- Time zone: UTC+12:00 (NZST)
  - Summer (DST): UTC+13:00 (NZDT)
- ISO 3166 code: NZ-MWT
- HDI (2023): 0.914 very high · 13th
- Website: www.horizons.govt.nz

Manawatū-Whanganui ([manawaˈtʉː ˈˀwaŋanʉi]; spelled Manawatu-Wanganui prior to 2019) is a region in the lower half of the North Island of New Zealand, whose main population centres are the cities of Palmerston North and Whanganui. It is administered by the Manawatū-Whanganui Regional Council, which operates under the name Horizons Regional Council. The region covers over 22,000 square kilometres (13,670.166 mi), making it the sixth largest region by area in the country and is home to 261,100 residents.

== Name ==
The region takes its name from the two major rivers flowing through it: the Manawatū River and the Whanganui River.

In the Māori language, the name Manawatū is a compound word that originates from an old Māori waiata (song). The waiata "Ka tatū e hine ko Manawatū" describes the search by an early ancestor, Haunui-a-Nanaia, for his wife, during which he named various waterways in the district, and says that his heart (manawa) settled or momentarily stopped (tatū) when he saw the Manawatū River.

Whanga nui is a phrase meaning "big bay" or "big harbour". The first name of the European settlement at Whanganui was Petre (pronounced Peter), after Lord Petre, an officer of the New Zealand Company, but the name was never popular and was officially changed to "Wanganui" in 1854. In the local dialect, Māori pronounce the wh in Whanganui as [ˀw], a voiced labial–velar approximant combined with a glottal stop, but to non-locals the name sounds like "Wanganui" and is hard to reproduce.

In 1991 the New Zealand Geographic Board considered demands from some local Māori to change the name of the river to Whanganui. After widespread controversy for many years, in September 2019 the New Zealand Geographic Board announced that from 18 October 2019 the name of the Manawatu-Wanganui region, and the regional council, would incorporate both the letter "h" and a macron, becoming "Manawatū-Whanganui". This became the official spelling of the name on 18 October, although the Manawatū-Whanganui Regional Council would continue to use the trading name of Horizons Regional Council.

== Government ==
The region covers all or part of ten territorial authority areas. Parts of five of these are covered by five other regions of New Zealand, the most of any region. In descending order of land area the territorial authority districts are Ruapehu, the major parts of Tararua District and Rangitikei, Manawatū, Whanganui, Horowhenua, and small parts of Stratford, Waitomo, and Taupō. The largest city is Palmerston North, with a population of 85,300 (June 2012 estimate). It is the only territorial authority in the region to be administered by a city council.

The governing body of the regional council consists of 12 councillors from 6 constituencies across the region, elected by the public; from the north: Ruapehu (1 councillor), Whanganui (2), Manawatū-Rangitikei (2), Palmerston North (4), Horowhenua (2), Tararua District (1). It sits in Palmerston North. It has the responsibility for managing natural and physical resources, providing flood protection and monitoring environmental problems and fresh air, clean water, productive land and natural eco-systems. It is also responsible for public transport.

== Geography ==
The region is dominated and defined by two significant river catchments, the Whanganui and the Manawatu. The Whanganui River, in the northwest, is the longest navigable river in New Zealand. The river was extremely important to early Māori as it was the southern link in a chain of waterways that spanned almost two-thirds of the North Island. It was one of the chief areas of Māori settlement with its easily fortified cliffs and ample food supplies. Legends emphasise the importance of the river and it remains sacred to Whanganui iwi. Māori along the coast and lowland plains grew kūmara and other crops. The Manawatū River runs across the centre of the region, from rolling hill country in the east to the fertile Manawatū Plains in the west. The main city of Palmerston North is located on these plains, and is an important service city for the southern North Island as a whole. This river is unusual, in that it passes from hill country to plains through a gorge cut into much higher country, an indication that the hills have risen since the river formed.

To the southeast, a further, more sparsely populated area of the Tararua District lies between the sources of the Manawatū River near Norsewood and the Pacific coast. This area, often historically connected with both the Hawke's Bay Region to the north and the Wairarapa to the south, was historically simply known as Bush, a name which still survives in some businesses and organisations, most notably the Wairarapa Bush Rugby Football Union.

The two river catchments have very different natures. While the open Manawatū Plains became more densely settled by Europeans, inland Ruapehu, Rangitikei, and Whanganui remained more Māori-dominated, remote and independent, and is still heavily forested. As late as the 1950s the Whanganui River remained a river of mystery. Since then exploitation of the river's commercial potential has opened up the area, often causing friction with local Māori, who have long-standing grievances. Manawatū-Whanganui as a whole is one of the most important pastoral areas in New Zealand, its status recognised when the government opened the Massey Agricultural College in the 1920s.

Much of Manawatū-Wanganui was fertile and bush-covered when Europeans arrived and developed the area as a source of timber. Saw milling and flax milling dominated the 19th century, followed by an influx of sheep farmers who exploited the newly cleared ground. Deforestation, burn-offs of timber and scrub and large scale drainage combined with overgrazing, resulted in considerable environmental degradation. In the early 1900s authorities realised that careful management was needed to maintain this important agricultural area.

=== Topography ===
Manawatū-Whanganui takes up a large proportion of the lower half of the North Island. It is the second-largest local government region in the North Island and the sixth-largest in New Zealand, totalling 22,215 km^{2} (8,577 sq mi) (8.1% of New Zealand's land area). The region stretches from north of Taumarunui to south of Levin on the west coast, and across to the east coast from Cape Turnagain to Ōwhango. It borders the Waikato, Taranaki, Hawke's Bay and Wellington regions and includes river catchment areas that run from the volcanic plateau to the sea. The Pacific Ocean is the eastern boundary and the Ruahine Range forms a natural boundary with Hawke's Bay.

The area includes a variety of landscape formations. Districts close to the Volcanic Plateau are higher and more rugged, often subject to harsh temperatures in winter. The Manawatū District has a much gentler topography, consisting mainly of the flat, tree-studded Manawatū Plains that run between the ranges and the sea. The land was under the sea till about 500,000 years ago and still has a very thick layer of marine sediment, which is about five or six million years old. A block faulting system underneath the thick sediment has raised a series of domes and gentle depressions. These structures can provide natural storage areas for oil and some of the Manawatū domes have been drilled. The domes have shaped the course of the Manawatū River, giving it a meandering path which, uniquely among New Zealand rivers, begins close to the east coast and exits on the west coast. The Manawatū River begins just inside the Hawke's Bay Region, then flows through a deep gorge to the Manawatū Plains before exiting in the Tasman Sea. The river is also unique in New Zealand (and rare worldwide) in that this gorge (the Manawatū Gorge) is a water gap through recently uplifted rock, causing the river to flow from relatively low-lying land along an eroded course through higher terrain. The Whanganui District is more rugged, with canyon-like valleys and gorges carved out of the soft rock by rivers and ocean waves.

The region includes a series of mountain ranges, notably the Tararua Range and the Ruahine Range and the three major active volcanoes of the North Island. Mount Ruapehu at 2,797 m is the tallest mountain in the North Island, Ngauruhoe 2,291 m and Tongariro 1,968 m. During the last 100 years Ruapehu has experienced six significant eruptions, and last erupted in 1995 and 1996.

Three major rivers divide the region: the Whanganui (290 km [180 mi]), Manawatū (182 km [113 mi])), and Rangitīkei (241 km [150 mi]). The Whanganui is the second-longest river and has the second-largest catchment in the North Island, draining most of the inland region west of Lake Taupō. There are few roads in this area, which contains some of the largest surviving areas of native bush in the North Island.

=== Soil and climate ===
Soils are productive with the addition of nitrogen fertiliser. In the Manawatū and Horowhenua districts there are sandy soils and swampy hollows around the coast with loess-covered terraces and river flats inland. These river flats and swamp areas contain fertile alluvial and organic soils. On the drier terraces inland yellow-grey earths predominate. The flatter more fertile soils suit intensive sheep farming and cropping while the hill country of Rangitikei favours semi-intensive sheep and beef farming. Areas close to the volcanic plateau consist largely of pumice soils which lack some essential trace elements but within the region much of this land is occupied by national parks.

The region has a comparatively mild climate with greater climatic extremes inland. Chateau Tongariro experienced the lowest temperature recorded in the North Island, falling to −13.6 °C (7.5 °F) on 7 July 1937. In summer the region is warm, with a maximum mid-summer daily average of between 20.1 and 22.9 °C (68.2 and 73.2 °F). Sunshine hours approximate the national average for much of the region (1,800-2,000 hours per annum) but Palmerston North is defined as cloudy with an average of 1,725 sunshine hours. In the winter the minimum mid-winter daily average for coastal areas is 4.0 to 7.9 °C (39.2 to 46.2 °F), while inland areas are considerably colder. Waiouru has a minimum mid-winter daily average of 0.1 °C (32.2 °F).

Rainfall on the plains is slightly below average, with Palmerston North receiving 960 mm (38 in), while the rest of the region receives the New Zealand average rainfall of 1,000 to 2,000 mm (39 to 79 in).

=== Conservation and parks ===
The region contains areas of great ecological significance, reflected in the designation of approximately a seventh of its land area as part of the nation's conservation estate. Tongariro National Park is the largest park in the region (795.98 km^{2} [307.33 sq mi]) and is the oldest national park in the country, established in 1887. The volcanoes Tongariro, Ruapehu and Ngauruhoe are sacred to Māori and were given to the nation by Te Heuheu Tūkino IV, paramount chief of Ngāti Tūwharetoa. They form the nucleus of the park, which is designated a World Heritage Site.

Whanganui National Park is slightly smaller (742.31 km^{2} [286.61 sq mi]) and was established 99 years later when a series of reserves were incorporated into one area and given national park status. There are two state forest parks in the rugged, bush-clad Ruahine Range and Tararua Range. The four parks offer skiing, tramping, jetboating and white-water rafting and the opportunity to appreciate the environment.

The regional council, responsible for managing natural and physical resources, provides flood protection and monitors environmental problems such as pest infestation and pollution. Invasive plant pests such as African feathergrass, goats rue and nodding thistle pose a threat to pastureland in this heavily agricultural-dependent region, and the council has instituted control campaigns. The council has also instituted animal pest control programmes. Possums are perceived as the major animal pest since they damage native forests and endanger cattle production through the spread of bovine tuberculosis. Eradication programmes also concentrate on rabbits, rooks and feral goats, while other exotic species such as Parma wallaby (Macropus parma), wasps, ferrets, stoats and weasels are a source of concern.

=== Biodiversity ===
The internationally recognised Ramsar estuarine wetlands site at Foxton Beach is of note as having one of the most diverse ranges of wetlands birds to be seen at any one place in New Zealand. A total of 95 species have been identified at the estuary. It is a significant area of salt marsh and mudflat and a valuable feeding ground for many birds including the migratory Eastern bar-tailed Godwit, which flies all the way from Siberia to New Zealand to escape the harsh northern winter. The estuary is also a permanent home to 13 species of birds, six species of fish and four plants species, all of which are threatened. It regularly supports about one percent of the world population of wrybills.

== Demography ==
Manawatū-Whanganui Region covers 22,220.64 km^{2} (8,579.44 sq mi) and had an estimated population of 260,700 as of June 2025, with a population density of 12 people per km^{2}.

Historical population
Year	Pop.	±% p.a.
1991	224,760	—
1996	228,771	+0.35%
2001	220,089	−0.77%
2006	222,423	+0.21%
2013	222,672	+0.02%
2018	238,797	+1.41%
2023	251,412	+1.03%

Manawatū-Whanganui Region had a population of 251,412 in the 2023 New Zealand census, an increase of 12,615 people (5.3%) since the 2018 census, and an increase of 28,740 people (12.9%) since the 2013 census. There were 123,594 males, 126,804 females and 1,011 people of other genders in 96,291 dwellings. 3.2% of people identified as LGBTIQ+. The median age was 39.7 years (compared with 38.1 years nationally). There were 48,645 people (19.3%) aged under 15 years, 46,077 (18.3%) aged 15 to 29, 107,565 (42.8%) aged 30 to 64, and 49,122 (19.5%) aged 65 or older.

Religious affiliations were 31.4% Christian, 1.2% Hindu, 0.8% Islam, 2.1% Māori religious beliefs, 0.6% Buddhist, 0.6% New Age, 0.1% Jewish, and 1.3% other religions. People who answered that they had no religion were 54.3%, and 8.0% of people did not answer the census question.

Of those at least 15 years old, 28,686 (14.1%) people had a bachelor's or higher degree, 112,935 (55.7%) had a post-high school certificate or diploma, and 52,803 (26.0%) people exclusively held high school qualifications. The median income was $36,400, compared with $41,500 nationally. 15,501 people (7.6%) earned over $100,000 compared to 12.1% nationally. The employment status of those at least 15 was that 97,110 (47.9%) people were employed full-time, 27,678 (13.7%) were part-time, and 6,198 (3.1%) were unemployed.

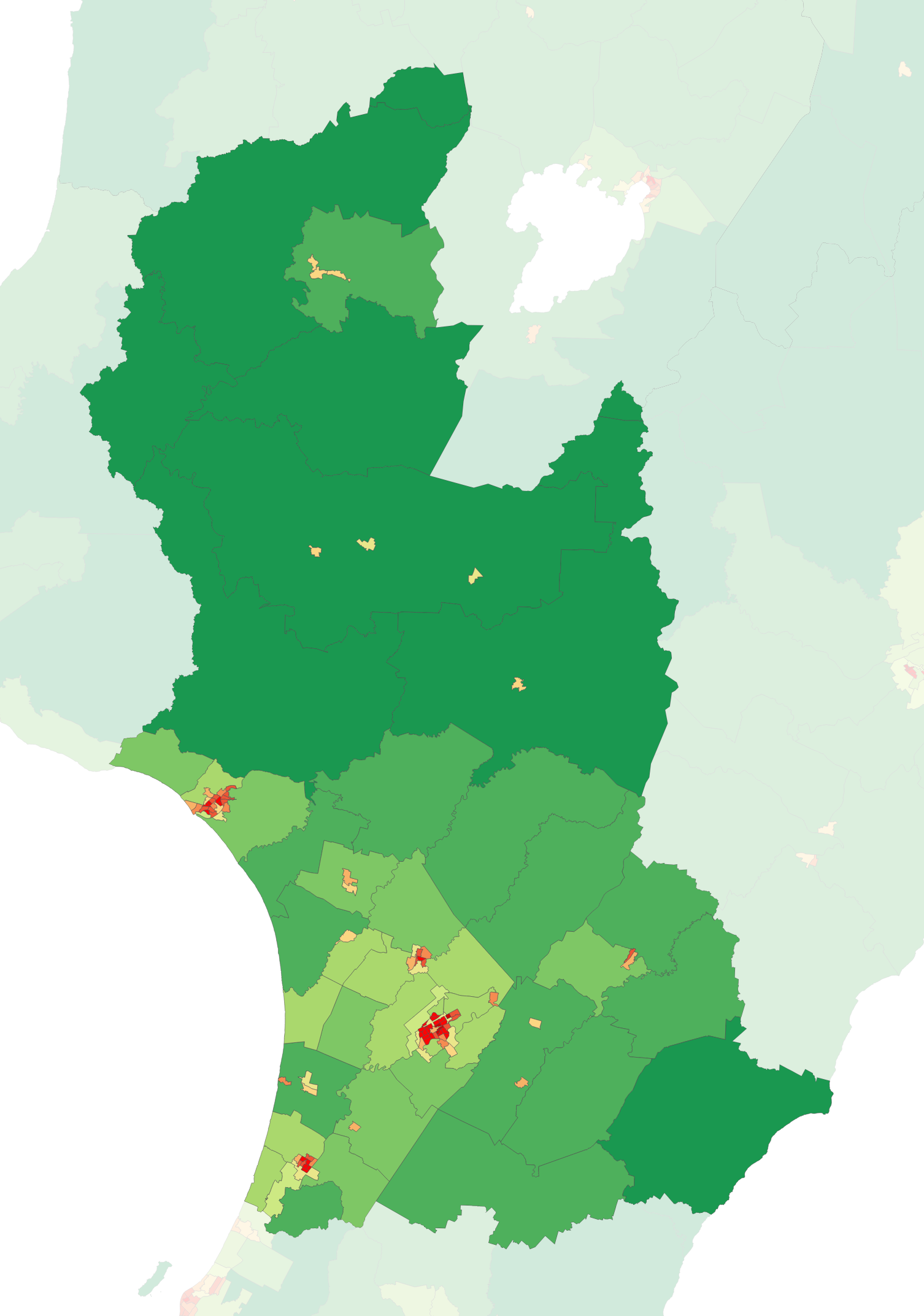
Population density in Manawatū-Whanganui at the 2023 census

=== Cities and towns ===
There are two major urban areas. Palmerston North, with a resident population of 81,200 (June 2025 estimate), expanded as an educational centre and a supply centre for the surrounding rural hinterland. It became a city in 1930. The other major urban area is Whanganui, with an estimated resident population of 42,800 as of June 2025.

Urban areas with a population of 1,000 or more include:

Urban area	Population (June 2025)	% of region
Palmerston North	81,200	31.1%
Whanganui	42,800	16.4%
Levin	20,500	7.9%
Feilding	17,650	6.8%
Marton	5,730	2.2%
Dannevirke	5,640	2.2%
Taumarunui	4,940	1.9%
Ashhurst	3,350	1.3%
Foxton	3,520	1.4%
Pahiatua	2,830	1.1%
Bulls	2,110	0.8%
Foxton Beach	2,190	0.8%
Taihape	1,720	0.7%
Woodville	1,680	0.6%
Shannon	1,650	0.6%
Ohakune	1,360	0.5%
Raetihi	1,140	0.4%

Other towns and settlements include:

- Bunnythorpe
- Eketāhuna
- Halcombe
- Himatangi Beach
- Hiwinui
- Hokio Beach
- Hunterville
- Kai Iwi
- Kimbolton
- Koitiata
- Longburn
- Manakau
- Mangaore
- Mangaweka
- National Park
- Norsewood
- Ohakea
- Ōhau
- Ōhura
- Ormondville
- Ōwhango
- Pohangina
- Pongaroa
- Rangataua
- Rātana
- Raurimu
- Rongotea
- Sanson
- Tangimoana
- Tokomaru
- Waikawa Beach
- Waiouru
- Waitarere Beach

=== Culture and identity ===
Largest groups of overseas-born residents
Nationality	Population (2018)
England	8,163
Australia	3,423
India	2,292
China	2,031
South Africa	1,830
Philippines	1,560
Samoa	1,290
Fiji	1,092
Scotland	1,062
United States	942

In the 2023 census, people could identify as more than one ethnicity. The results were 78.1% European (Pākehā); 25.1% Māori; 5.0% Pasifika; 7.7% Asian; 1.0% Middle Eastern, Latin American and African New Zealanders (MELAA); and 2.7% other, which includes people giving their ethnicity as "New Zealander". English was spoken by 96.6%, Māori language by 6.0%, Samoan by 1.0% and other languages by 8.5%. No language could be spoken by 2.1% (e.g. too young to talk). New Zealand Sign Language was known by 0.8%. The percentage of people born overseas was 15.9, compared with 28.8% nationally.Ethnicities in the 2018 census were 79.4% European/Pākehā, 22.9% Māori, 4.2% Pacific peoples, 6.4% Asian, and 2.2% other ethnicities (totals add to more than 100% since people could identify with multiple ethnicities).

== History ==
- Pre-1769 Approximately 3% of Māori lived in the Whanganui Basin and 8% on the Taranaki coast. Coastal Māori garden and gather food but life for Māori further inland is more difficult, relying on hunting and gathering.
- 1820–40 Ngāti Toa and Te Āti Awa iwi displace local iwi from their lands.
- 1830 Te Rauparaha (Ngāti Toa) lay siege to Pūtiki Pā in retaliation for an attack on Kapiti Island, sacking the pā and killing its inhabitants.
- 1831 European traders arrive in the Whanganui area, led by Joe Rowe, supposedly a dealer in preserved heads (moko mokai). A dispute with local Māori leads to the death of three of his party and his own head is cut off and preserved.
- 1840 Jerningham Wakefield (Edward Gibbon Wakefield's son) purchases 40,000 acres (160 km^{2}) of land, under dubious circumstances, for the New Zealand Company, including the town site for Petre (later to be Wanganui). The first European settlers start arriving in Petre.
- 1842 The first organised European settlers in Horowhenua arrive at Paiaka.
- 1847 In July the "Battle of St John's Wood" occurs when 400 Māori clash with an equal force of British Regulars.
- 1848 The Crown purchases Wanganui, 80,000 acres (320 km^{2}), 8,000 acres (32 km^{2}) of which are supposed to be set aside as a reserve.
- 1855 Paiaka settlers move closer to the coast at "Foxton", which becomes a port handling flax, timber and agricultural produce.
- 1856 The Wanganui Chronicle is first published.
- 1860s Scandinavians settle in the Tararua District, later founding Eketāhuna, Dannevirke, and Norsewood.
- 1865 A battle ensues between the Hau Hau adherents (who were largely upper Whanganui Māori), who want to expel the Pākehā at Wanganui, and the Māori of the lower river.
- 1866 Palmerston North (Te Papai-oea) is founded. It is surrounded by forests, with the Manawatū River serving as its only link with the port of Foxton and the outside world.
- 1870s The bush is gradually felled and the Manawatū opened up for European farms and settlement. Former Danish Prime Minister, Bishop Ditlev Gothard Monrad, organises a settlement of Danes near Awapuni.
- 1871 The first sawmill is established at Palmerston North.
- 1872 Wanganui becomes a borough.
- 1875 The Manawatu Times is published for the first time at Palmerston North.
- 1876 A railway opens between Foxton and Palmerston North via Longburn, later named the Foxton Branch. Wellington Province abolished.
- 1877 Palmerston North becomes a borough.
- 1878 A railway line opens between Palmerston North and Wanganui. The first portion later became part of the North Island Main Trunk railway, between Aramoho and Wanganui the Wanganui Branch, and the rest part of the Marton–New Plymouth Line.
- 1884 The Sanson Tramway, built and operated by the Manawatu County Council, opens to Sanson, New Zealand from the Foxton Branch at Himatangi.
- 1885 Mother Mary Joseph Aubert starts her community of the Daughters of Our Lady of Compassion at Jerusalem, founding a home for Māori orphans, the elderly and infirm. The private Castleciff Railway opens between Wanganui and Castlecliff.
- 1886 The Wellington and Manawatu Railway opens between Wellington and Longburn railway (later the North Island Main Trunk), superseding the Foxton link and ensuring Palmerston North's growth.
- 1889 Levin is founded because of the construction of Wellington & Manawatu Railway
- 1908 The North Island Main Trunk reaches Taumarunui and thence Auckland, opening up the inland districts for development.
- 1906 Levin becomes a borough.
- 1924 Wanganui becomes a city.
- 1925 Mangahao power station near Shannon is completed; electricity supply is established to Palmerston North, Levin, Feilding, Dannevirke and Pahiatua.
- 1926 Electricity supply from Mangahao to Wanganui completed.
- 1930 Palmerston North becomes a city.
- 1934 A major earthquake measuring 7.6 on the Richter scale strikes near Pahiatua and causes widespread damage from Porangahau to Castlepoint.
- 1939 Ohakea Air Force Station commences operations.
- 1945 The Sanson Tramway closes.
- 1953 New Zealand's worst rail disaster occurs at Tangiwai on the North Island Main Trunk, as the railway bridge collapses because of a lahar flow from the crater lake on Mount Ruapehu. A train with Christmas holiday-makers plunges into the flood, killing 151 people.
- 1956 The private railway between Wanganui and Castlecliff is purchased by the government and incorporated into the national railway network as the Castlecliff Branch.
- 1959 The Foxton Branch railway closes.
- 1963 Massey University is formed by a merger of a branch of Victoria University (at Palmerston North) with Massey Agricultural College.
- 1970 Famous New Zealand poet James K. Baxter sets up a commune at Jerusalem.
- 1991 In formal recognition of its original name the government renames the Wanganui River the Whanganui River.
- 1995 Occupation of Moutoa Gardens (Whanganui) in protest at the slowness of the Waitangi Tribunal claim settlement process and loss of control of the Whanganui River.
- 1995–96 A series of small eruptions occurs on Mt Ruapehu, throwing ash over a wide area.
- 2004 Sustained heavy rain in February caused the region's worst flooding in over 100 years.
- 2015 Wanganui district, and therefore the urban area of Wanganui, is renamed Whanganui by the NZ Geographic Board.

== Economy ==
The subnational gross domestic product (GDP) of Manawatū-Whanganui was estimated at NZ$11.60 billion in the year to March 2019, 3.8% of New Zealand's national GDP. The regional GDP per capita was estimated at $46,764 in the same period. In the year to March 2018, primary industries contributed $1.26 billion (11.5%) to the regional GDP, goods-producing industries contributed $2.01 billion (18.3%), service industries contributed $6.76 billion (61.6%), and taxes and duties contributed $942 million (8.6%).

Agriculture dominates the economy. A higher than average proportion of businesses were engaged in the agriculture, forestry and fishing industries, 6.3% compared with 4.4% nationally. Businesses engaged in retail trade were dominant numerically. In 1997 there were 2,300 businesses, employing a total of 10,380 full-time equivalents (FTEs). The percentage of businesses engaged in manufacturing was slightly higher than the national average and manufacturing employed the greatest number of people (12,830 FTEs).

=== Agriculture ===
The region is known for its strong agricultural base, which prompted the establishment of an agricultural college there in the 1920s. The government wanted to promote scientific farming and established colleges in two of the most important farming areas, Canterbury and the Manawatū. Research by members of the college into animal genetics in the 1930s led to the development of new breeds of sheep, the Drysdale and the Perendale, which became commercially significant after World War II.

Agriculture dominates land use although there are areas of forestry and horticulture. Soils and climate favour pastoral farming. There were 6,344 farm holdings on 30 June 1996, which was almost a tenth of all farm holdings in New Zealand. Farming occupied 72.5% of land, which was much higher than the national average of 60.1%. Approximately 80% of this land was used for agricultural purposes (grazing, arable, fodder and fallow land). In the Manawatū, Rangitikei and Tararua Districts this percentage rose to over 90% of total land.

The region is one of the most important areas of pastoral farming in New Zealand. It had 7,216,177 sheep (at 30 June 1996), the largest number of sheep in the North Island and the fourth-highest figure in the country behind Canterbury, Southland and Otago. Barley, which is used for the manufacture of stock feed and for malting, is grown. The region produces the largest quantities of barley in the North Island, providing 10% of the national refined crop of 302,804 tonnes in 1995.

The region has 4,062 hectares (10,040 acres) of horticultural land, of which 3,647 hectares are used for vegetable growing. While only having 8% of the country's 45,000-hectare vegetable-growing land, the Manawatū-Whanganui region grows 26% of New Zealand's asparagus, 20% of its lettuce, 19% of its brassicas (broccoli, cabbage and cauliflower), and 10% of its carrots and potatoes.

=== Forestry ===
The region is one of the most significant forestry areas in the southern North Island. The predominant soil type, yellow-brown earths, when enhanced by the use of fertilisers, is very suitable for forestry. Forestry has a long history in the Manawatū since Palmerston North developed as a saw-milling town, and the region's initial prosperity depended on heavy exploitation of native timbers. But land use practices inhibited the long term viability of this indigenous forestry industry. Severe burn-offs destroyed large areas of native forest and subsequent overgrazing affected the soils. Forestry largely disappeared until the early twentieth century. In an attempt to combat erosion problems in sandy soils the government planted forests in the Foxton/Levin area in the early twentieth century. Inland forests were planted later. Some private native forest has been set aside for sustainable logging but most forestry depends on exotic plantings.

=== Energy ===
Unlike its neighbour Taranaki, Manawatū-Whanganui has not been a major producer of energy or minerals. Some new power schemes are operating, including the southern hemisphere's largest collection of wind farms, with 194 installed turbines and more planned.

=== Government and defence ===
The New Zealand Defence Force maintains three bases in the Manawatū-Whanganui region: Waiouru Military Camp in the Ruapehu district, RNZAF Base Ohakea near Bulls, and Linton Military Camp near Palmerston North.

=== Tourism ===
For the eight quarters between September 1996 and June 1998 the region averaged 4.1% of total guest nights in New Zealand. This was close behind Wellington at 6.7% and greater than Hawke's Bay, which averaged 3.1%. Occupancy rates, at 20.1%, were the fourth-lowest in the country for the June 1998 quarter. Rates for the city of Palmerston North were significantly higher than the national average (39.5% compared with 25.8%) whereas districts such as Ruapehu are far more seasonal with fairly low occupancy rates except in the peak ski season.

=== Museums ===
Key cultural institutions in the region include Te Manawa in Palmerston North, the Whanganui Regional Museum, the Sarjeant Gallery and the Quartz Museum of Studio Ceramics in Whanganui, the National Army Museum in Waiouru, and the multi-cultural Te Awahou Nieuwe Stroom in Foxton.

=== Transport ===
State Highway 1, the main highway, and the North Island Main Trunk railway, which both link Auckland and Wellington, run through the region. The Palmerston North–Gisborne Line and State Highway 3 follow the Manawatū Gorge, linking the region with Hawke's Bay. The Marton–New Plymouth Line provides a railway link with Taranaki, and from this line the short Wanganui Branch runs to Whanganui. Road and rail transport give the region's exporters easy access to ports.

The region has approximately 16% of the North Island's road length. There are 8,732 km (5,426 mi) of road, of which two-thirds are sealed. Approximately 12% of roads are classified as urban and three-quarters as rural, with almost half of the rural roads being unsealed. With 945.9 km (587.8 mi) the region has the second-highest length of state highways in the North Island, after Waikato.

Air travel in the region is served by Palmerston North Airport and Whanganui Airport. However, other airports such as Hawke's Bay Airport, New Plymouth Airport and Wellington Airport can also be used by air travellers from the region.
