= Waiopehu College =

Location
- 74 Bartholomew Road; Levin 5510; New Zealand; 40.63038°S 175.29621°E

Information
- Funding type: State
- Established: February 1973
- Ministry of Education Institution no.: 237
- Chairperson: Jenny Warren
- Principal: Guy Reichenbach
- Years offered: 9–13
- Gender: Coeducational
- Enrolment: 570 (July 2026)
- Website: www.waiopehu.ac.nz

Waiopehu College is a state coeducational secondary school located in Levin, New Zealand. The school opened in February 1973 as Levin's second secondary school, after Horowhenua College struggled to cope with 1200 students. Serving Years 9 to 13 (ages 13 to 18), the school has a roll of 570 students as of July 2026.

The original school buildings were built to the Education Department's S68 design: single-storey classroom blocks of cinderblock or masonry construction, with low-pitched roofs and internal open courtyards. The college is one of many that have problems with leaking roofs due to the S68's roof design. In 2014 the school opened a purpose-built teen parent unit. The building won an award in the 'education' category at the 2015 New Zealand Institute of Architects Awards. In 2016 a new special needs unit was opened.

== Enrolment ==
As of July 2026, Waiopehu College has roll of 570 students, of which 266 (46.7%) identify as Māori.

As of 2026, the school has an Equity Index of 513, placing it amongst schools whose students have many socioeconomic barriers to achievement (roughly equivalent to deciles 2 and 3 under the former socio-economic decile system).

== Notable alumni ==
- Barry Petherick – former principal at Waiopehu College, made a Member of the New Zealand Order of Merit in the 2016 Queen's Birthday Honours List for his work in education.
- Carlos Spencer – rugby union player and coach, All Black (1995–2004).
- Robert Nopera (Chubb) Tangaroa - international softball player, made a Member of the New Zealand Order of Merit in the 2004 Queen's Birthday Honours List.
