= Horizons Regional Council =

Regional council of New Zealand

Horizons Regional Council Te Kaunihera ā rohe o Manawatū-Whanganui

Type
- Type: Regional council of Manawatū-Whanganui

History
- Founded: 1989

Leadership
- Chair: Nikki Riley
- Deputy chair: Fiona Gordon

Structure
- Seats: 14
- Political groups: Independent (13); Te Pāti Māori (1)
- Length of term: 3 years

Elections
- Voting system: FPP
- Last election: 2025
- Next election: 2028

Website
- www.horizons.govt.nz

Manawatū-Whanganui Regional Council (Māori: Te Kaunihera ā rohe o Manawatū-Whanganui), branded as Horizons Regional Council, is the regional council of the Manawatū-Whanganui region of New Zealand's lower North Island. The council has 14 elected members, including a chair.

The council was established in 1989. Under the Local Government Act 2002, it is required to promote sustainable development – the social, economic, environmental and cultural well-being of their communities.

As of 2023, it is a part owner of CentrePort Wellington with a 23% shareholding, with the remaining shares held by Greater Wellington Regional Council.

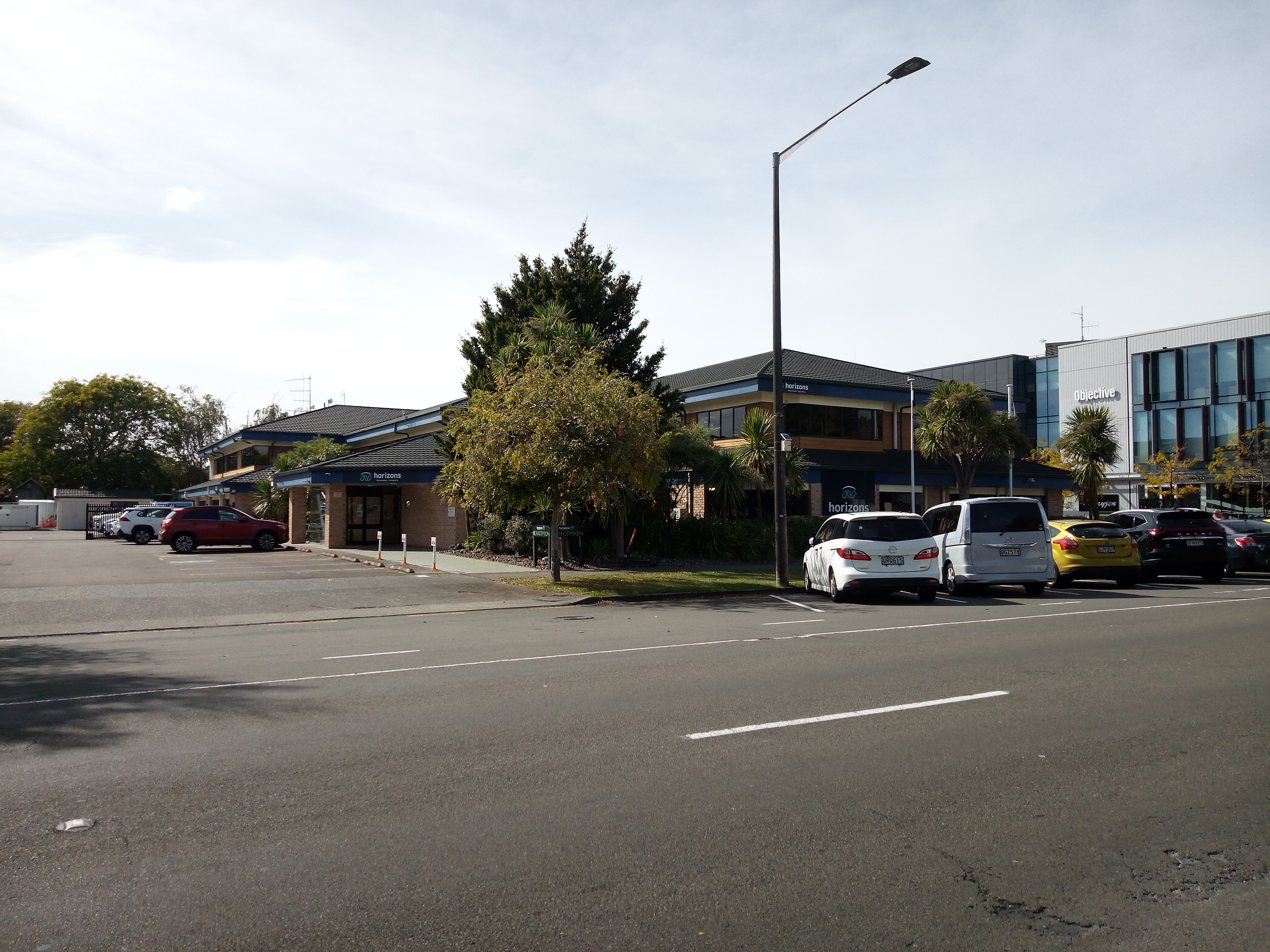
Horizons Regional Council building, Victoria Ave, Palmerston North

== List of chairpersons ==
- ?: Rachel Keedwell; deputy Jono Naylor
- October 2025: Nikki Riley; deputy Fiona Gordon

== Councillors ==
The 14 regional councillors were elected in the 2022 local elections from six general constituencies, Ruapehu, Whanganui, Manawatū-Rangitīkei, Palmerston North, Tararua and Horowhenua, and two Māori constituencies, Raki Māori and Tonga Māori.

Horizons Regional Council, 2022–2025
Position	Name	Ward	Affiliation (if any)
Chair	Rachel Keedwell	Palmerston North	
Deputy Chair	Jono Naylor	Palmerston North	
Councillor	Wiremu Te Awe Awe	Palmerston North	
Councillor	Fiona Gordon	Palmerston North	
Councillor	Emma Clarke	Horowhenua	
Councillor	Sam Ferguson	Horowhenua	
Councillor	Bruce Gordon	Manawatū-Rangitīkei	Independent
Councillor	Gordon McKellar	Manawatū-Rangitīkei	Independent
Councillor	David Cotton	Whanganui	Rate Restraint
Councillor	Alan Taylor	Whanganui	
Councillor	Nikki Riley	Ruapehu	
Councillor	Allan Benbow	Tararua	Independent
Councillor	Turuhia (Jim) Edmonds	Raki Māori	
Councillor	Te Kenehi Teira	Tonga Māori	

== Elections ==
  - 1989
  - 1992
  - 1995
  - 1998
  - 2001
  - 2004
  - 2007
  - 2010
  - 2013
  - 2016
  - 2019
  - 2022
  - 2025
