= Mayor of Horowhenua =

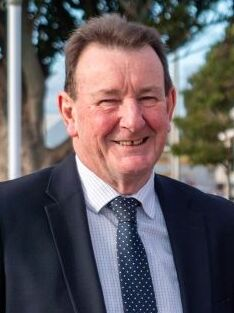
- Incumbent; Bernie Wanden since 2019
- Style: His/Her Worship
- Term length: Three years, renewable
- Inaugural holder: Malcolm Guy
- Formation: 1989
- Deputy: David Allan
- Salary: $141,395
- Website: Official website

The mayor of Horowhenua officiates over the Horowhenua District Council.

Bernie Wanden has been mayor since 2019. Before being elected as mayor, he had served as a Horowhenua councillor.

== List of mayors ==
Since its inception in 1989, Horowhenua District has had five mayors:

	Name	Portrait	Term
1	Malcolm Guy		1989–1995
2	Tom Robinson		1995–2004
3	Brendan Duffy		2004–2016
4	Michael Feyen		2016–2019
5	Bernie Wanden		2019–present

== Deputy mayor ==
The deputy mayor is appointed by the mayor at the first meeting of the council following the triennial elections. Whilst the deputy mayor exercises the same roles as other elected members, they must also perform the responsibilities and duties of the mayor if the mayor is absent, incapacitated, or the office of the mayor is vacant. The deputy mayor can be removed from office if decided upon by the council.

=== Controversies ===
In October 2016, Ross Campbell was appointed as deputy mayor by newly-elected mayor Michael Feyen. However, in December 2016, the remaining nine councillors voted against this decision, with longstanding councillor Wayne Bishop elected to replace Campbell. After this vote, Feyen attempted to reappoint Campbell as deputy mayor, seeking a judicial review to remove Bishop from office and reinstate Campbell. In 2017, it was decided that Campbell had no legal standing and that the council would continue on with business as usual, with Bishop as deputy mayor.

=== List of deputy mayors ===
Name	Term	Mayor
Brendan Duffy	1998–2001	Robinson
Unknown	2001–c. 2002	Robinson
David Colling	fl.2002–2006	Robinson Duffy
David Colling	fl.2002–2006	Duffy
Barry Judd	c. 2007–2013	Duffy
Garry Good	2013–2016	Duffy
Ross Campbell	2016	Feyen
Wayne Bishop	2016–2019	Feyen
Jo Mason	2019–2022	Wanden
David Allan	2022–present	Wanden
