= Suze Redmayne =

National Party politician in New Zealand

Suze Redmayne MP
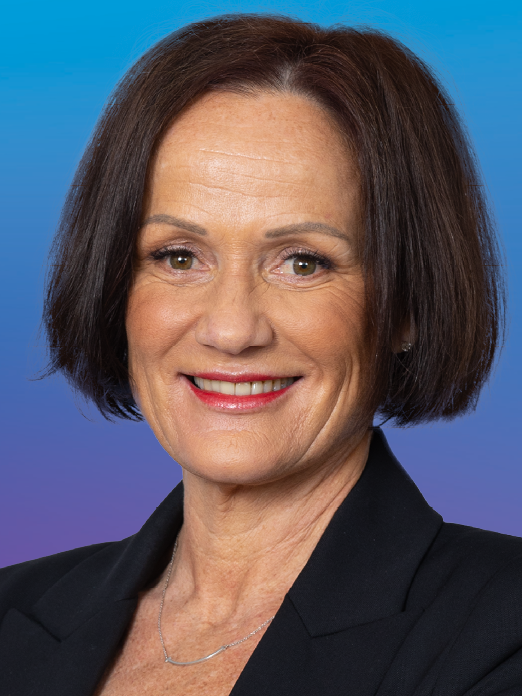
- Redmayne in 2023

Member of the New Zealand Parliament for Rangitīkei
- Incumbent
- Assumed office 14 October 2023
- Preceded by: Ian McKelvie

Personal details
- Born: Susan Emma Dossor; 1965 or 1966 (age 60–61)
- Party: National
- Spouse: Richard Redmayne
- Children: 3
- Education: University of Otago

Susan Emma Dossor Redmayne (née Dossor; born 1965 or 1966) is a New Zealand politician and Member of Parliament for Rangitīkei representing the National Party.

== Early life and career ==
Born in 1965 or 1966, Redmayne received a Bachelor of Arts degree from the University of Otago. She and her husband Richard have run Tunnel Hill farm in Turakina since 1993, through which they operate their lamb brands Coastal Lamb and Coastal Spring Lamb. Both the farm and the brands have won awards. Redmayne is or has been a trustee for two local foundations, the Whanganui Community Foundation and Sport Whanganui.

== Political career ==
New Zealand Parliament
Years	Term	Electorate	List	Party
2023–2026	54th	Rangitīkei	21	National
2026–present	55th	Rangitīkei	31	National

Redmayne worked in the Rangitīkei electorate offices of Simon Power and Ian McKelvie for over 20 years, which she said gave her a good understanding of the electorate and of the political world. She has referred to McKelvie as her mentor.

=== First term, 2023–2026 ===
On 5 November 2022, Redmayne was announced as National's candidate for Rangitīkei at the 2023 general election. During campaigning she said one of her priorities, if elected, would be returning a 24-hour police presence to Feilding. She also identified the financial problems facing Ruapehu Alpine Lifts as an issue she would like to help solve as an MP. Redmayne describes herself as "fiscally conservative and socially liberal. I’m pro-choice and I’m not particularly religious". She also said that she would cross the floor if National Party leader Christopher Luxon proposed changing any New Zealand abortion laws.

With 93.5% of the vote counted, Redmayne had received more than twice as many votes as the Labour candidate Zulfiqar Butt. Final results released on 3 November confirmed that Redmayne had won by a margin of 9,785 votes. She is the first female member of Parliament for the electorate.

=== Second term, 2026–present ===
During the 2026 New Zealand general election, Redmayne contested the Rangitīkei electorate for National. She was ranked 31st on the National Party list. Based on preliminary results, Redmayne retained the Rangitīkei electorate by a large margin of 5,506 votes.

New Zealand Parliament
Preceded by Ian McKelvie	Member of Parliament for Rangitīkei; 2023–present	Incumbent
