= List of rivers of the Manawatū-Whanganui Region =

The following is a list of rivers in the Manawatū-Whanganui Region. The list is arranged in arranged North to South by the location of the river mouth. Tributaries are indented under their downstream parent's name and arranged by nearest to the source.

== Tasman Sea ==
- Whanganui River
  - Whakapapa River
  - Pungapunga River
  - Ongarue River
    - Maramataha River
    - Taringamotu River
  - Ohura River
    - Taumona River
  - Retaruke River
  - Tāngarākau River
  - Whangamōmona River
  - Manganui o te Ao River
    - Makatote River
    - Mangaturuturu River
- Whangaehu River
  - Wahianoa River
  - Mangawhero River
    - Makotuku River
- Turakina River
  - Mangapapa River
- Rangitīkei River
  - Mangamaire River
  - Whakaurekou River
    - Mangatera River
    - Maropea River
      - Waikamaka River
  - Moawhango River
    - Moawhango West River
  - Hautapu River
  - Kawhatau River
    - Pourangaki River
  - Mangawharariki River
- Manawatū River
  - Mangatewainui River
  - Mangatoro River
  - Tamaki River
  - Tiraumea River
    - Ihuraua River
    - Makuri River
    - Mangaone River
    - Mangatainoka River
      - Mākākahi River
  - Mangahao River
  - Pohangina River
  - Oroua River
  - Tokomaru River
- Ohau River

== Pacific Ocean (Wairarapa Coast) ==
- Wainui River
- Ākitio River
  - Red River
- Aohanga River
  - Pongaroa River
