= Linton, New Zealand =

Suburb of Palmerston North, New Zealand

Linton
- Suburb
- Interactive map of Linton
- Coordinates: 40°26′S 175°33′E
- Country: New Zealand
- City: Palmerston North
- Local authority: Palmerston North City Council
- Electoral ward: Te Hirawanui General Ward; Te Pūao Māori Ward
- Postcode: 4472

	(Manawatū River)	Linton Military Camp
Opiki	Linton
Tokomaru

Linton is a suburb of the New Zealand city of Palmerston North, situated 11 km (6.8 mi) south-west of the city.

The Linton Military Camp, the largest army camp in New Zealand, is four kilometres north-east of the settlement.

== History ==
Linton is named for James Linton, an early settler in the area, and also twice Mayor of Palmerston North. The Scotsman was one of the first European settlers in Palmerston. He and his wife, Sarah, arrived on horseback from Wairarapa early in 1871. Linton served as mayor of Palmerston North 1879–82 and 1884–85, and was a director and ardent promoter of the Wellington and Manawatu Railway Company.

The site of the original planned Linton township is several kilometres away from current army camp, at the location of a Wellington and Manawatu Railway Company station on the Wellington ‒ Longburn railway line. Along with several other directors of this private company, James Linton was honoured by having a railway station settlement on the line named after him. The line, opened in 1886, was a successful venture, but the Linton township did not develop. In 1889, a school was established, and St Columba's Church, which serve the small farming community.

Prior to 1996, Linton was part of the Manawatu electorate. However, due to the reformation of the electoral system from FPP to MMP, the electorate of Palmerston North's boundaries were redrawn to include Linton. In 2007, the boundaries were redrawn and Linton was shifted into the Rangitikei electorate.

Until 2013, Linton was part of the Ashhurst-Fitzherbert Ward of Palmerston North City Council, alongside Aokautere and Turitea.

== Demographics ==
Pihauatua statistical area, which includes Linton, covers 141.87 km^{2} (54.78 sq mi). It had an estimated population of 1,150 as of June 2025, with a population density of 8.1 people per km^{2}.

Historical population for Pihauatua
Year	Pop.	±% p.a.
2006	1,089	—
2013	960	−1.79%
2018	984	+0.50%
2023	1,098	+2.22%
The 2006 population is for a larger area of 143.78 km^{2}. Source:

Pihauatua had a population of 1,098 in the 2023 New Zealand census, an increase of 114 people (11.6%) since the 2018 census, and an increase of 138 people (14.4%) since the 2013 census. There were 561 males, 531 females, and 6 people of other genders in 381 dwellings. 2.5% of people identified as LGBTIQ+. The median age was 40.9 years (compared with 38.1 years nationally). There were 249 people (22.7%) aged under 15 years, 159 (14.5%) aged 15 to 29, 525 (47.8%) aged 30 to 64, and 165 (15.0%) aged 65 or older.

People could identify as more than one ethnicity. The results were 86.9% European (Pākehā); 16.7% Māori; 1.6% Pasifika; 4.9% Asian; 1.4% Middle Eastern, Latin American and African New Zealanders (MELAA); and 5.5% other, which includes people giving their ethnicity as "New Zealander". English was spoken by 96.2%, Māori by 4.6%, and other languages by 10.7%. No language could be spoken by 2.5% (e.g. too young to talk). New Zealand Sign Language was known by 0.3%. The percentage of people born overseas was 18.3, compared with 28.8% nationally.

Religious affiliations were 36.3% Christian, 0.8% Hindu, 1.1% Islam, 0.8% Buddhist, 0.3% New Age, 0.3% Jewish, and 1.6% other religions. People who answered that they had no religion were 51.1%, and 7.9% of people did not answer the census question.

Of those at least 15 years old, 282 (33.2%) people had a bachelor's or higher degree, 420 (49.5%) had a post-high school certificate or diploma, and 144 (17.0%) people exclusively held high school qualifications. The median income was $52,200, compared with $41,500 nationally. 156 people (18.4%) earned over $100,000 compared to 12.1% nationally. The employment status of those at least 15 was 492 (58.0%) full-time, 138 (16.3%) part-time, and 15 (1.8%) unemployed.

== Education ==
Linton Country School was a co-educational full state primary school. It opened in 1889 and closed in 2023 due to a small roll and problems with staff, governance and finance.
