= Makerua Swamp =

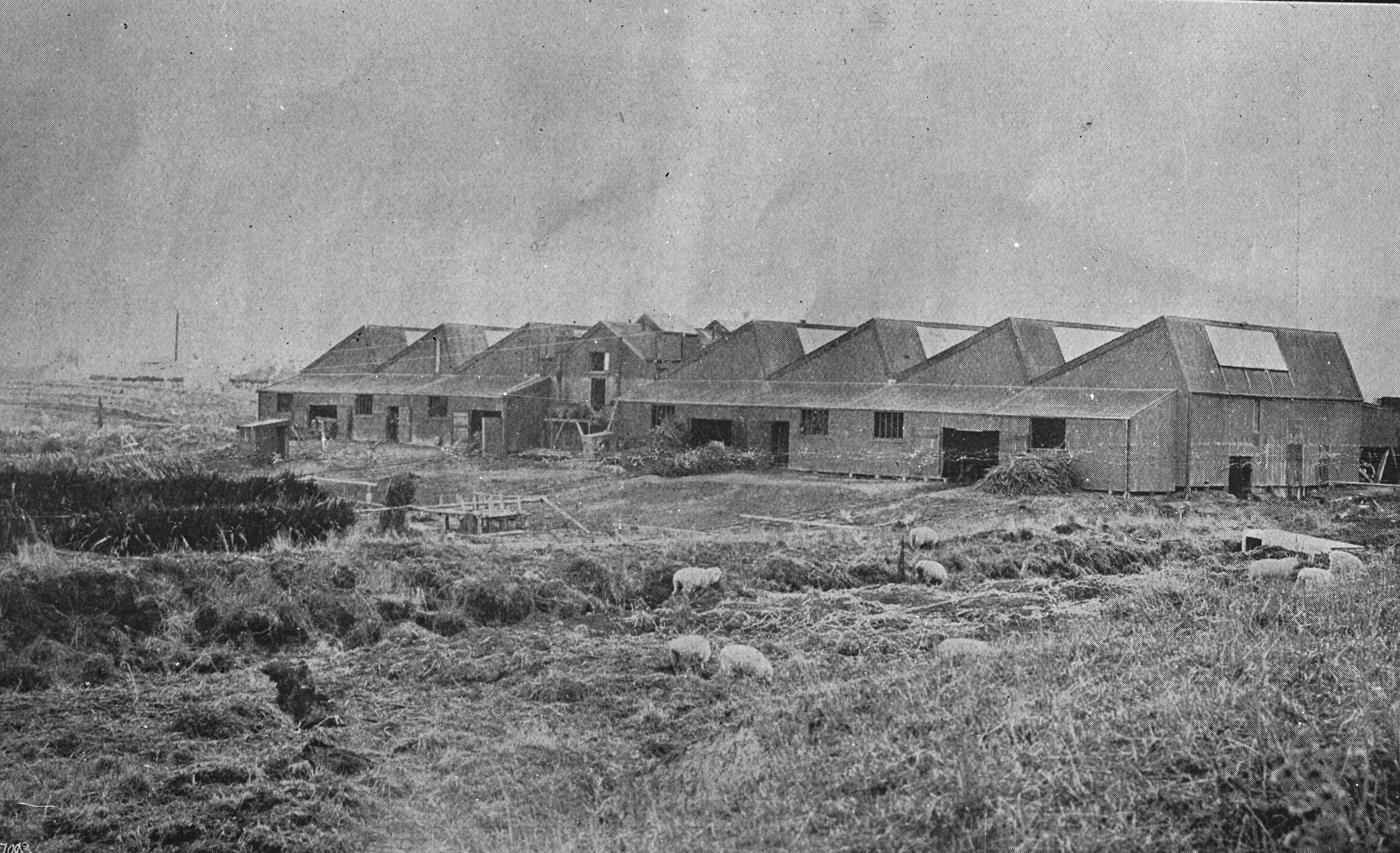
- The Miranui flax mill at Makerua Swamp around 1910
- Interactive map of Makerua Swamp
- Location: Manawatū-Whanganui, North Island
- Coordinates: 40.41°S 175.55°E

The Makerua Swamp (also known as the Opiki Plains) is an area of the Opiki District of the Manawatū-Whanganui region of New Zealand. In the early 20th century it was the location of flax mills that operated on the banks of the Manawatū River. Flax fibre from New Zealand flax or harekeke, was an important produce of New Zealand. The swamp covered about 5,800 ha (14,000 acres).

== Drainage ==
Makerua was one of the areas the government gave to the Wellington and Manawatu Railway Company to finance construction of the line. Work to drain the swamp began in 1884, with felling of bush along the banks of the Tokomaru River. Over 30 mi (48 km) of drains and 11 mi (18 km) of tramway had been built by 1903. A drainage board was formed in 1906. By 1924 73 mi (117 km) of stopbanks had been formed along the Manawatū River and 3 mi (4.8 km) each along the Mangaone and Tokomaru. After closure of the flax mills, more drainage was done to convert the land for farming. The Makerua Drainage Scheme now covers 14,600 ha (36,000 acres) and has 1,066 km (662 mi) of drains and 9 pumping stations. The Makerua Swamp Wildlife Management Reserve was set up in 1986 to conserve wildlife in a 45 ha (110 acres) area.

== Mills ==
The Miranui flax mill near Shannon was owned by the Seifert brothers. Miranui (Māori for Big Mill) operated from 1907 to 1933, and was the largest in the district. At its peak it had seven stripping machines and 300 employees. Miranui had much better labour relations than the other mills.

== Transportation ==
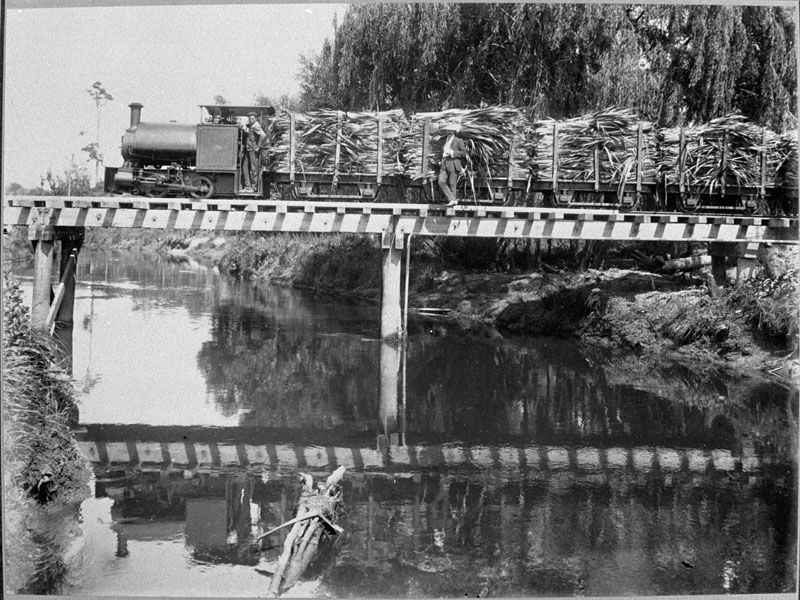
Miranui Flaxmill locomotive crossing the Tokomaru Stream near Shannon, (1908)

The Miranui flax mill was the only mill that operated a 3 1/2 miles (5.6 km) long 3 ft (914 mm) narrow gauge tramway from the mill to the fields in the swamp. It purchased in 1907 a 5-ton steam locomotive from Bagnall and Co in England to haul the bespoke flax wagons. However, even this lightweight engine proved too heavy for the flimsy tracks across the swamps and it was sold to work later on the Piha Tramway on the West Coast near Auckland and near Raetihi in the central North Island. Horse-drawn narrow gauge railways on temporary tracks for harvesting the hemp on the fields were used from 1910 onwards.

As Makerua railway station was nearby, it was possible to transport the bales of flax via the North Island Main Trunk railway to seaports, from where they could be exported overseas.

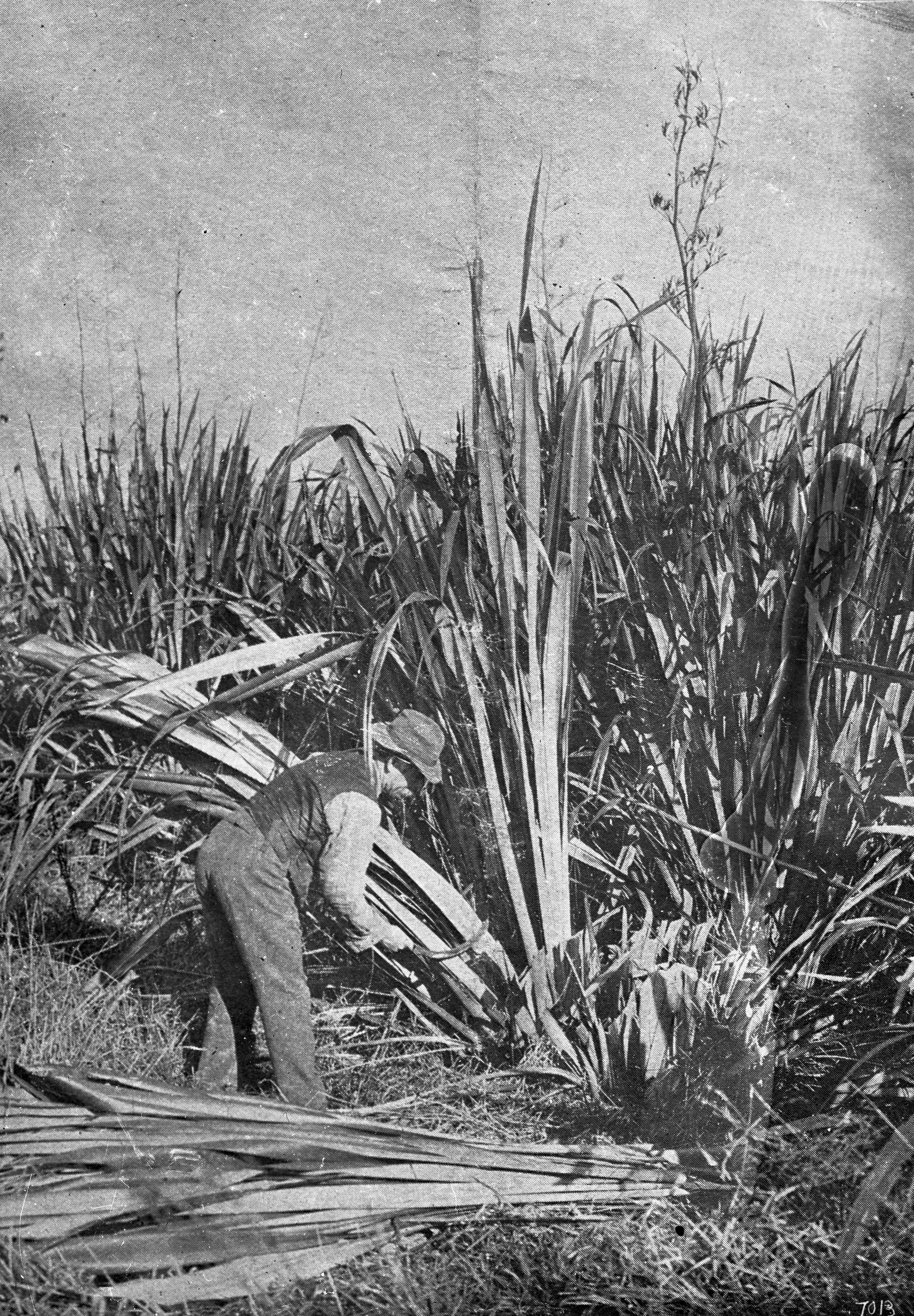
A 'cutter' harvesting the green leaves, using a sickle

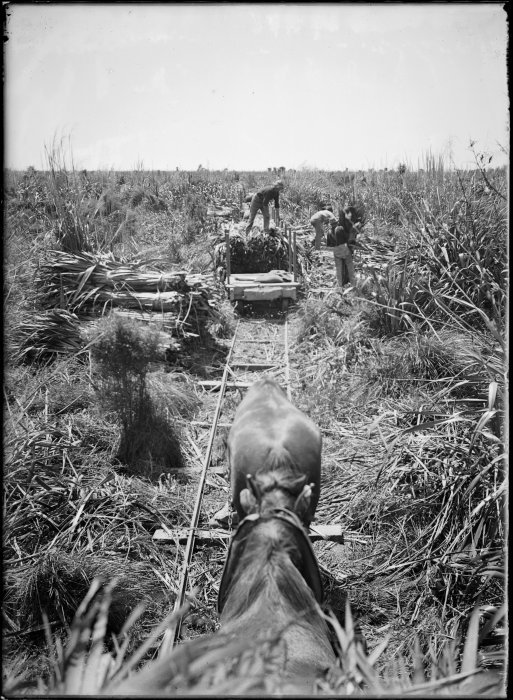
Loading cut flax onto horse-drawn trucks to be hauled to Miranui mill

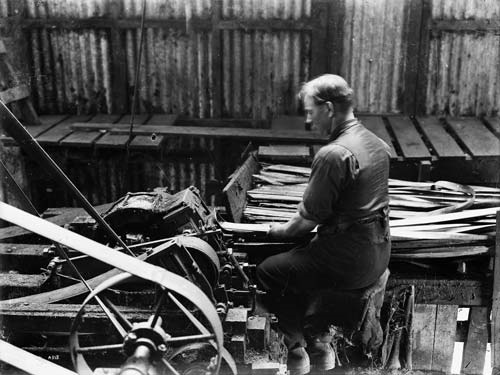
A flax worker feeding a flax leaf into the stripper

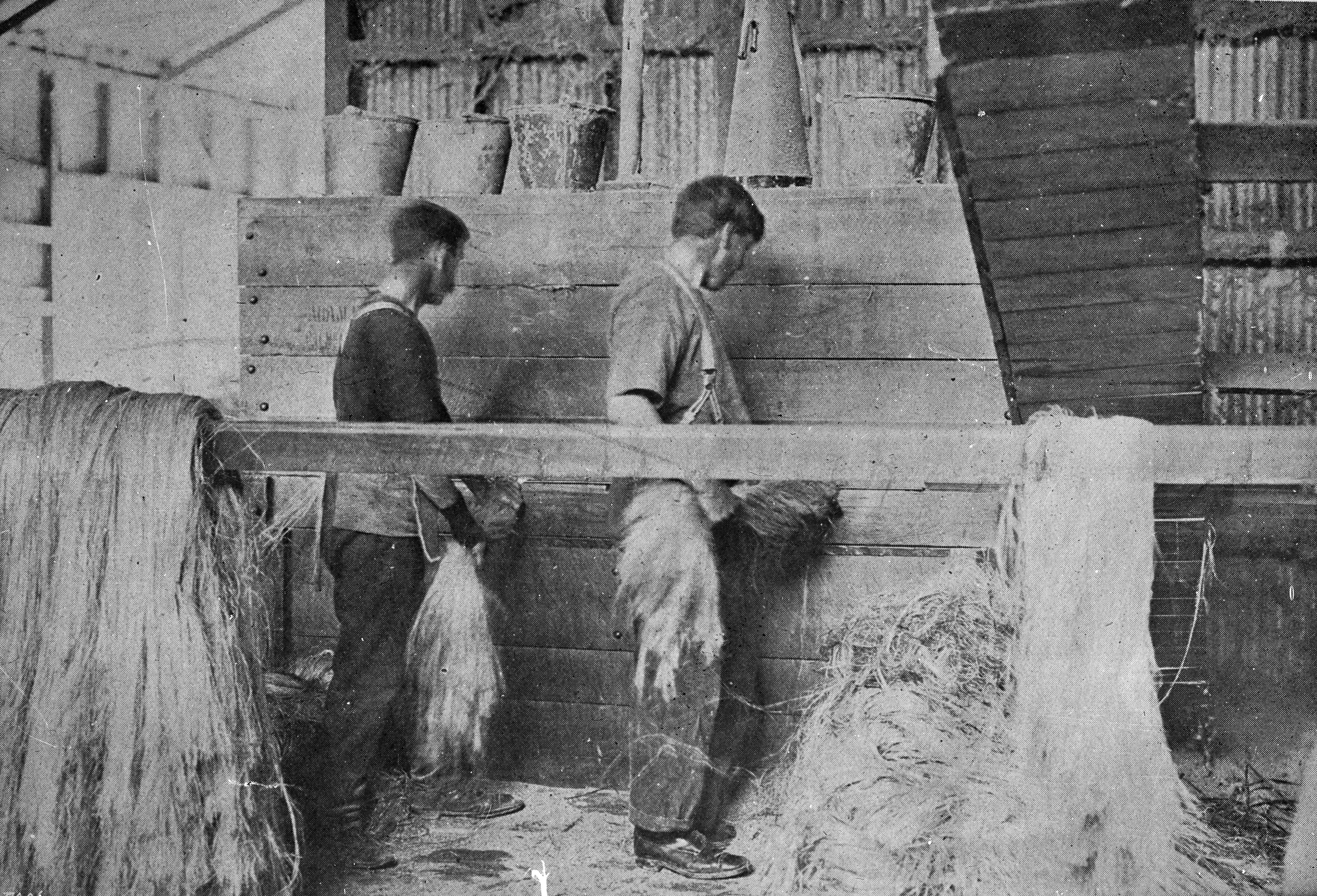
Two flax workers scutching the fibre

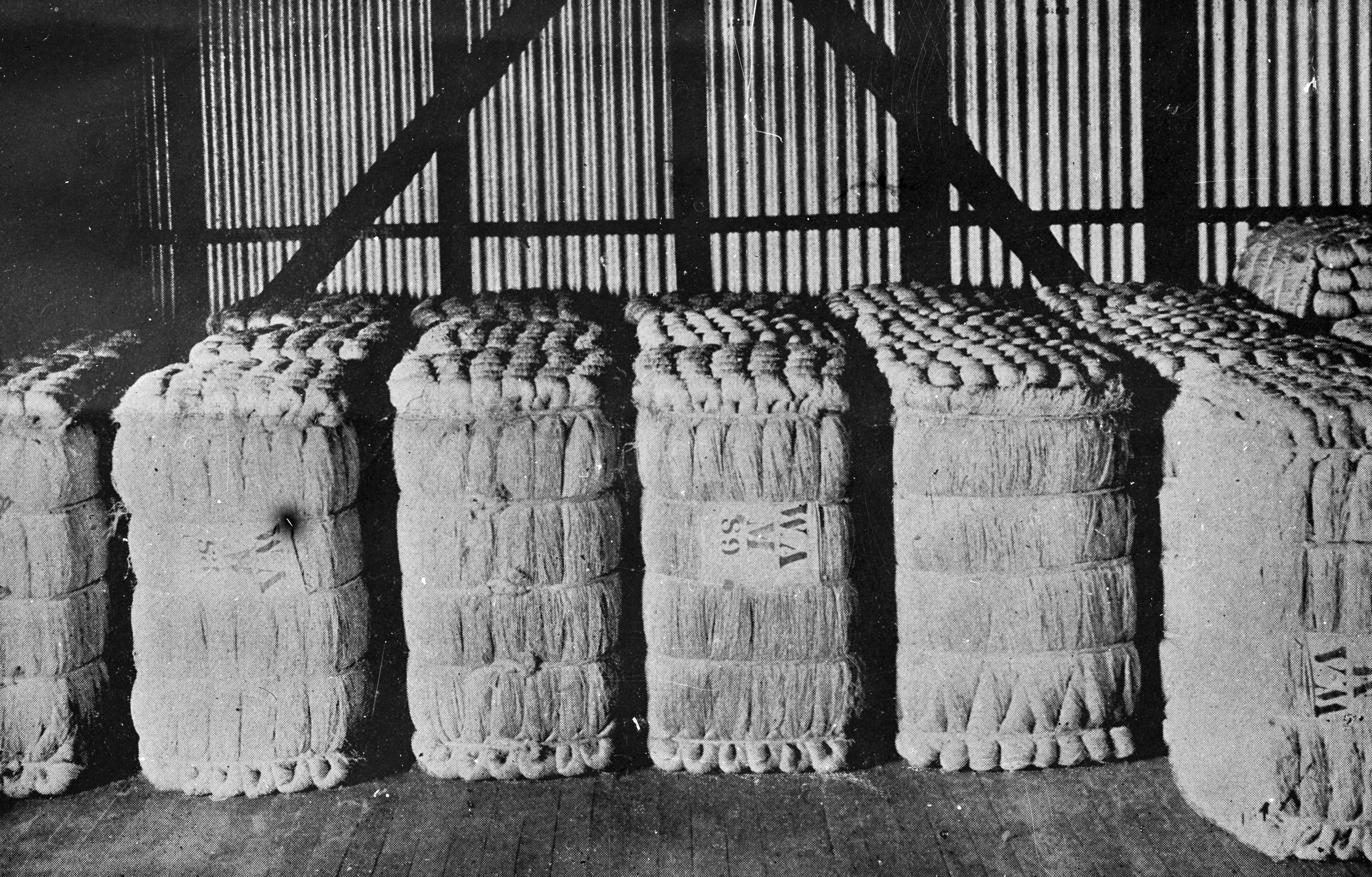
Bales of flax fibre ready to be transporte to the market

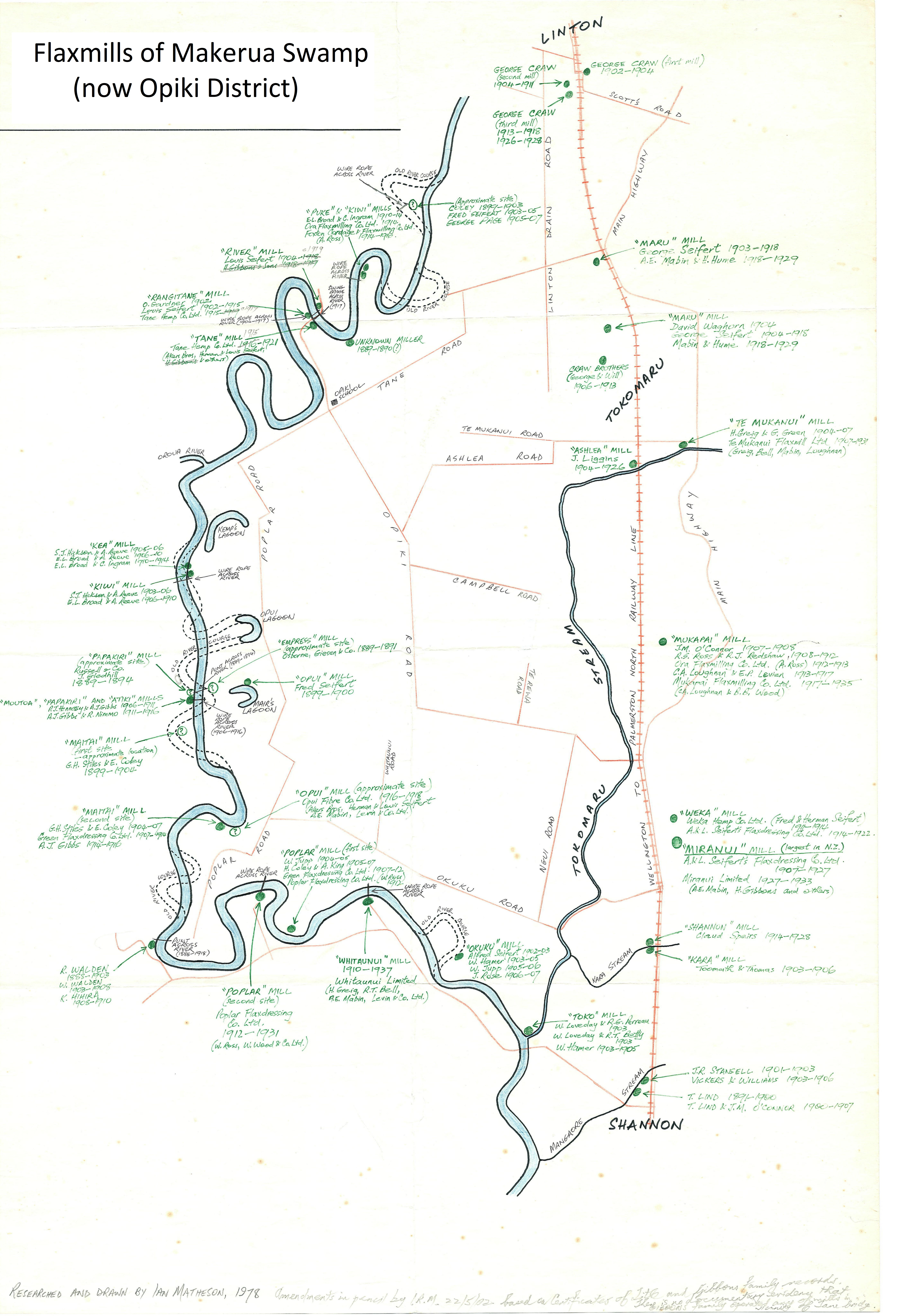
Flaxmills of Makerua Swamp
