= Waikamaka River =

Coordinates: 39°39′S 176°03′E

Location
- Country: New Zealand

Physical characteristics
- Source
  - location: Ruahine Range
- Mouth
  - location: Whakaurekou River
- Length: 15 km (9 mi)

The Waikamaka River is a river of the Manawatū-Whanganui region of New Zealand's North Island. It is a tributary of the Whakaurekou River, part of the Rangitikei River system. The Waikamaka flows northwest from its sources in the Ruahine Range to reach the Whakaurekou 15 kilometres (9 mi) east of Taihape.

== See also ==
- List of rivers of New Zealand
