= Tokomaru =

Tokomaru may refer to:

- Tokomaru Bay, a bay and town on the East Coast of New Zealand
- Tokomaru, New Zealand, a town in the Horowhenua district
  - Tokomaru railway station in Horowhenua
- Tokomaru (canoe), a Māori migration canoe
- SS Tokomaru, a British cargo ship, built in 1893 and torpedoed in the English Channel in 1915
