= Tokomaru railway station =

Defunct railway station in New Zealand

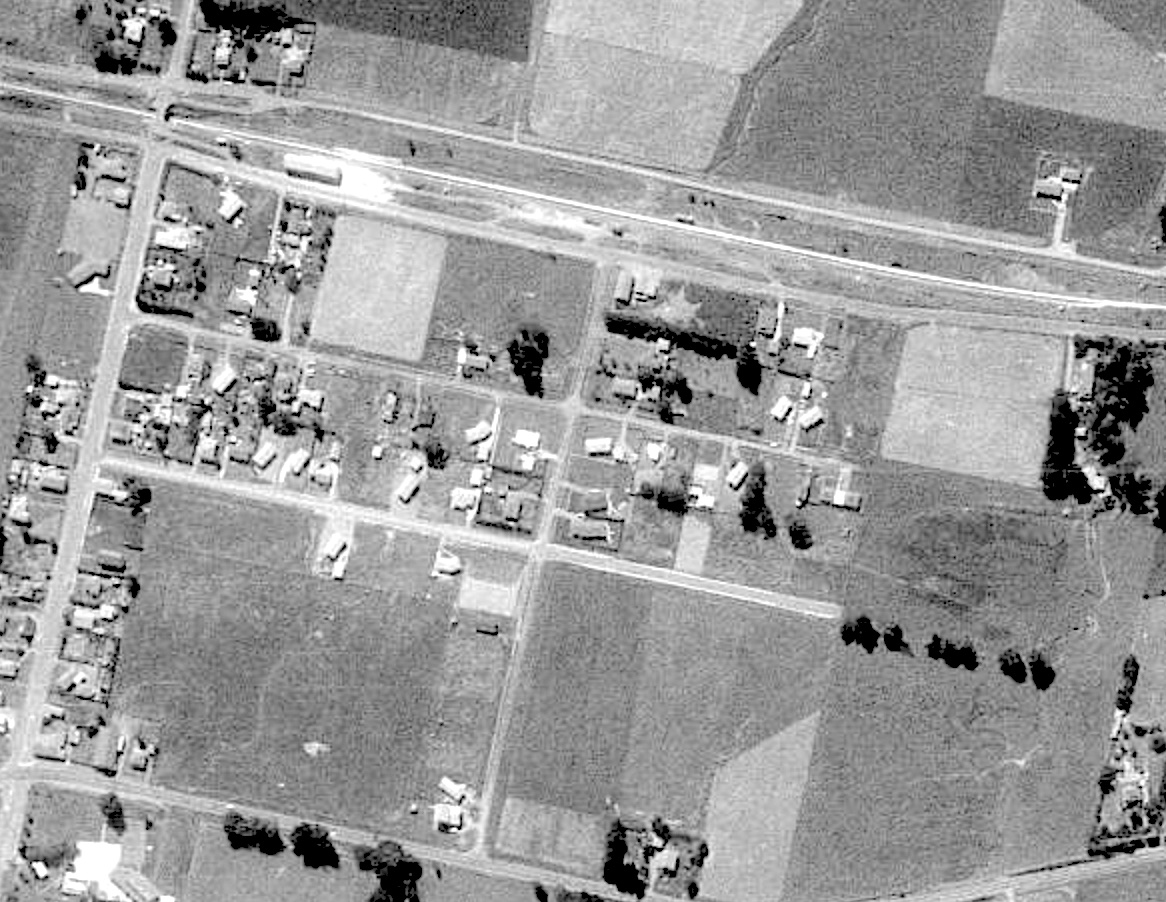
- Tokomaru in 1982

General information
- Location: Nikau Street; Tokomaru, New Zealand
- Coordinates: 40.469753°S 175.508598°E
- Elevation: 18 m (59 ft)
- Line: North Island Main Trunk
- Distance: Wellington 118.56 km (73.67 mi)

History
- Opened: 7 July 1885
- Closed: passengers 5 September 1971 goods 31 January 1982

Services
Preceding station	Historical railways	Following station
Linton; Line open, station closed 5.66 km (3.52 mi)	North Island Main Trunk; KiwiRail	Makerua; Line open, station closed 7.24 km (4.50 mi)
Location

Tokomaru railway station was a station on the North Island Main Trunk. It served Tokomaru in Horowhenua District the Manawatū-Whanganui region of New Zealand.

The station opened in 1885 and closed in 1982. A small shed and a passing loop remain at the station site.

== History ==
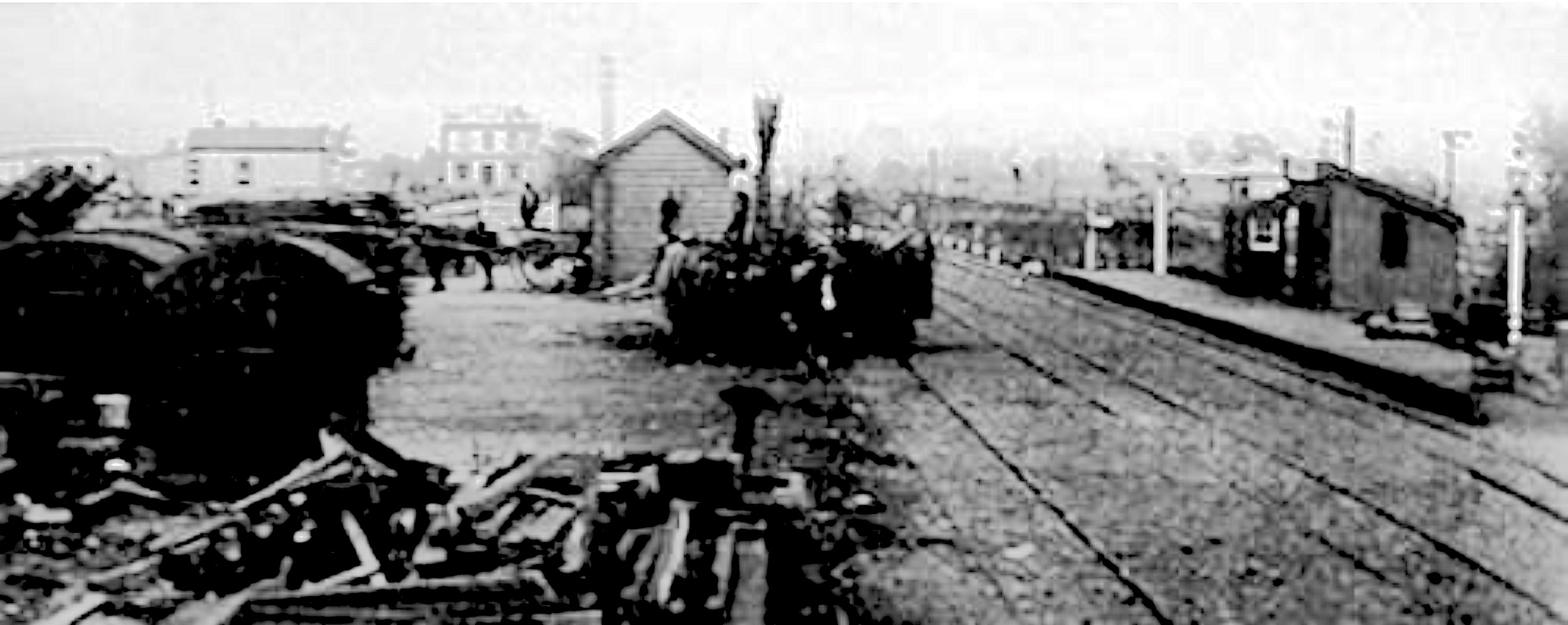
Tokomaru about 1908

By March 1885 the first 9 mi (14 km) of the Wellington and Manawatu Railway Company from Longburn had been built, which included Tokomaru. It may therefore have opened for goods in July 1885, but there was no regular passenger service for another year. A special train ran from Longburn to Ohau in April 1886. From Monday 2 August 1886 WMR trains started to run between Longburn and Ōtaki. Tokomaru was shown in the time and fare-tables, but only as a flag station. The first through train from Wellington to Palmerston North ran on 30 November 1886.

A goods shed and cattle yards were built in 1893 and enlarged in 1907. The station was also improved in 1909, so that by 1911 it had a shelter shed, platform, cart approach, 54 ft (16 m) by 12 ft (3.7 m) goods shed, loading bank, cattle and sheep yards and a passing loop for 52 wagons (extended in 1913 to 69 wagons, in 1940 to 90 wagons and in 1948 to 101 wagons). A ladies waiting room was added in 1911. From 1908 a tablet was used.

Railway houses were built in 1891, 1909 and 1927.

The Makerua Swamp was to the north west of the railway, where 11 mi (18 km) of tramway had been laid by 1903. There were also many other flax mills in the area, six being within a mile of the station in 1906. Swainson & Bevan had a tramway to the station, operating from about 1899 to 1909.

The NIMT crosses the Tokomaru River almost 2 km (1.2 mi) south of the station.

By 1966 only two passenger trains a week stopped at Tokomaru. In 1981 the main traffic was lime and fertiliser.
