= Makerua railway station =

Defunct railway station in New Zealand

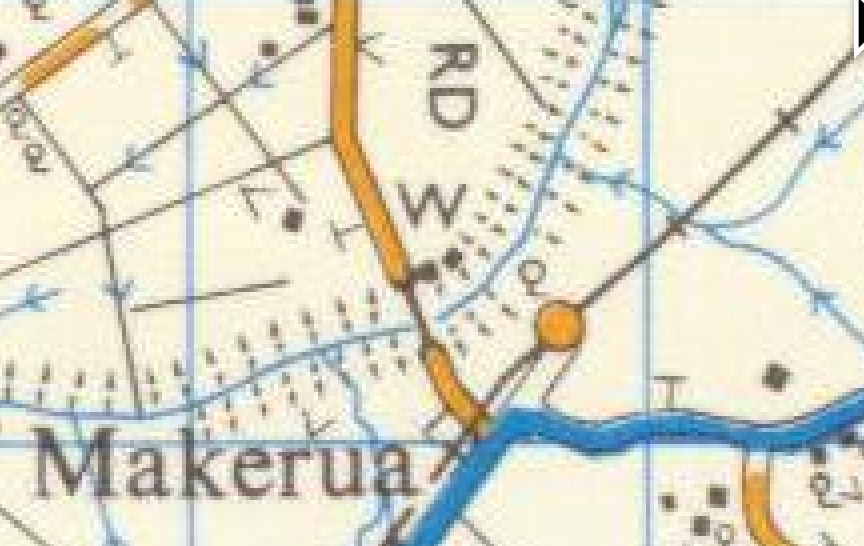
- 1961 one inch map

General information
- Location: Makerua, New Zealand
- Coordinates: 40.512653°S 175.453649°E
- Elevation: 8 m (26 ft)
- Line: North Island Main Trunk
- Distance: Wellington 111.32 km (69.17 mi)

History
- Opened: 2 August 1886
- Closed: 23 October 1966

Services
Preceding station	Historical railways	Following station
Tokomaru; Line open, station closed 7.24 km (4.50 mi)	North Island Main Trunk; KiwiRail	Shannon; Line open, station open 4.69 km (2.91 mi)
Location

Makerua railway station was a station in Horowhenua District on the North Island Main Trunk in New Zealand. Only a single track now passes through the station site.

== History ==
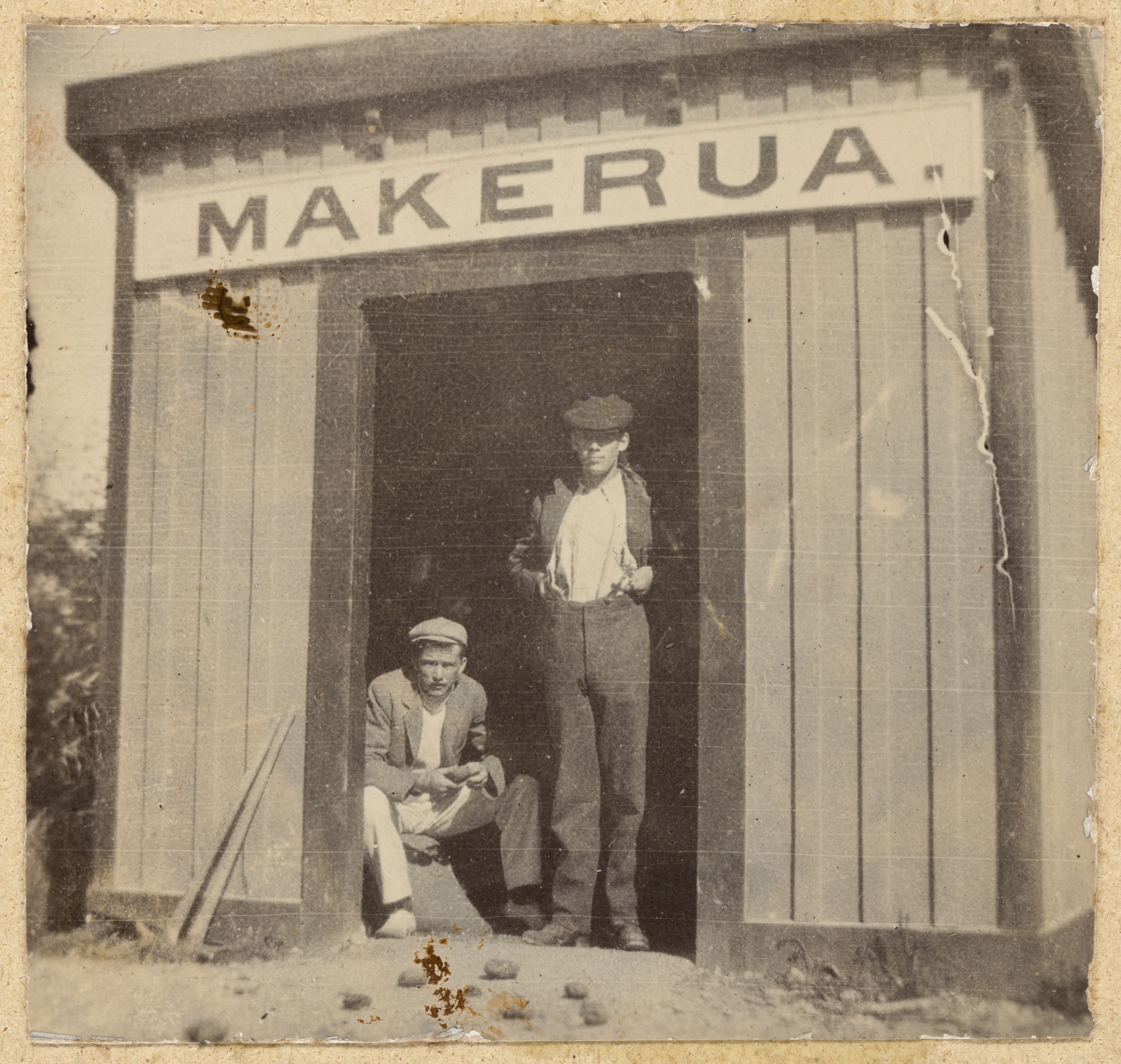
Makerua shelter shed about 1910

Makerua was opened as a flag station by the Wellington and Manawatu Railway Company on Monday 2 August 1886, when trains started to run between Longburn and Ōtaki, though a special train had run from Longburn to Ohau in April 1886. The first through train from Wellington to Palmerston North ran on 30 November 1886. Makerua didn't appear in timetables until 1888. Palmerston to Wellington trains started to call at the station from 1910.

In 1889 a new siding and platform were built at Makerua. By 1911 it had a shelter shed, platform and a loop for 16 wagons. From 1929 a tablet was used. A new station was built in 1946.

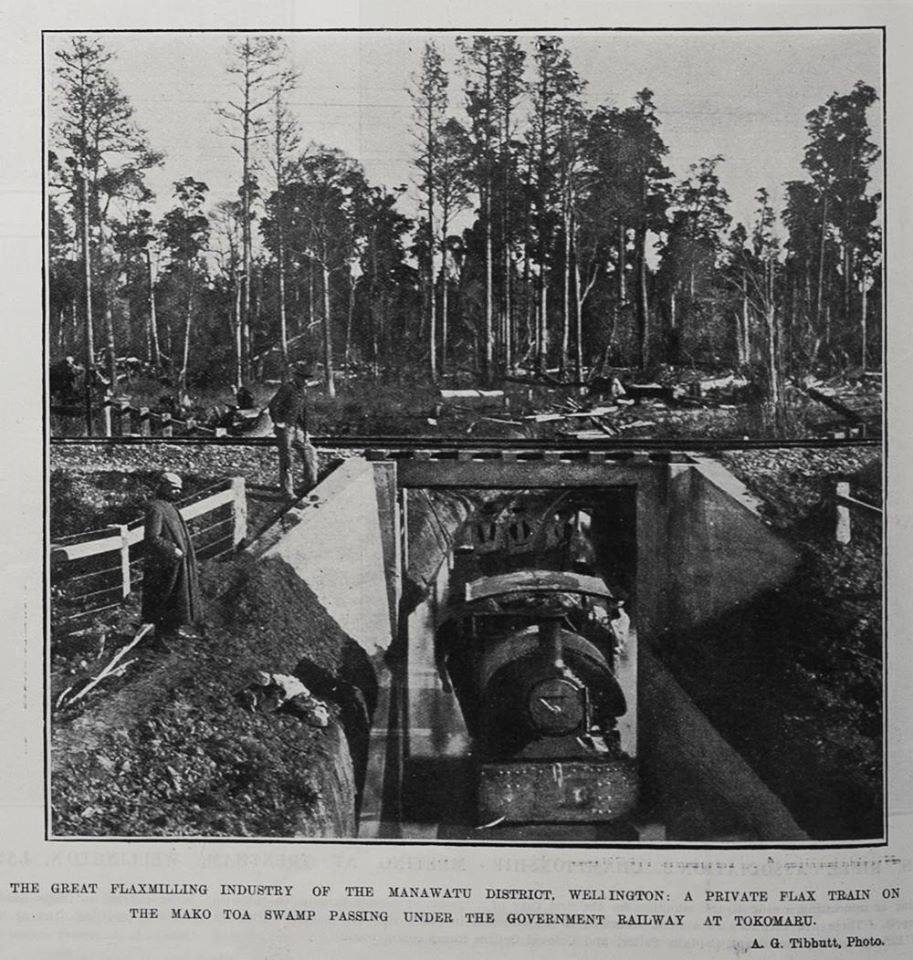
A private train on the Mako Toa Swamp passing under Government Railway at Tokomaru

The Makerua Swamp was to the north west of the railway, where 11 mi (18 km) of tramway had been laid by 1903. There were also many other flax mills in the area.

Trains were blown off the lines at Makerua in 1916 and in 1936, when the shelter shed was also blown over. An anemometer installed at Shannon in 1937 now checks wind speeds.

On 23 October 1966, or 1967 Makaroa closed to all traffic.
