= Manawatū Plains =

Low-lying land in New Zealand

Coordinates: 40.38°S 175.41°E

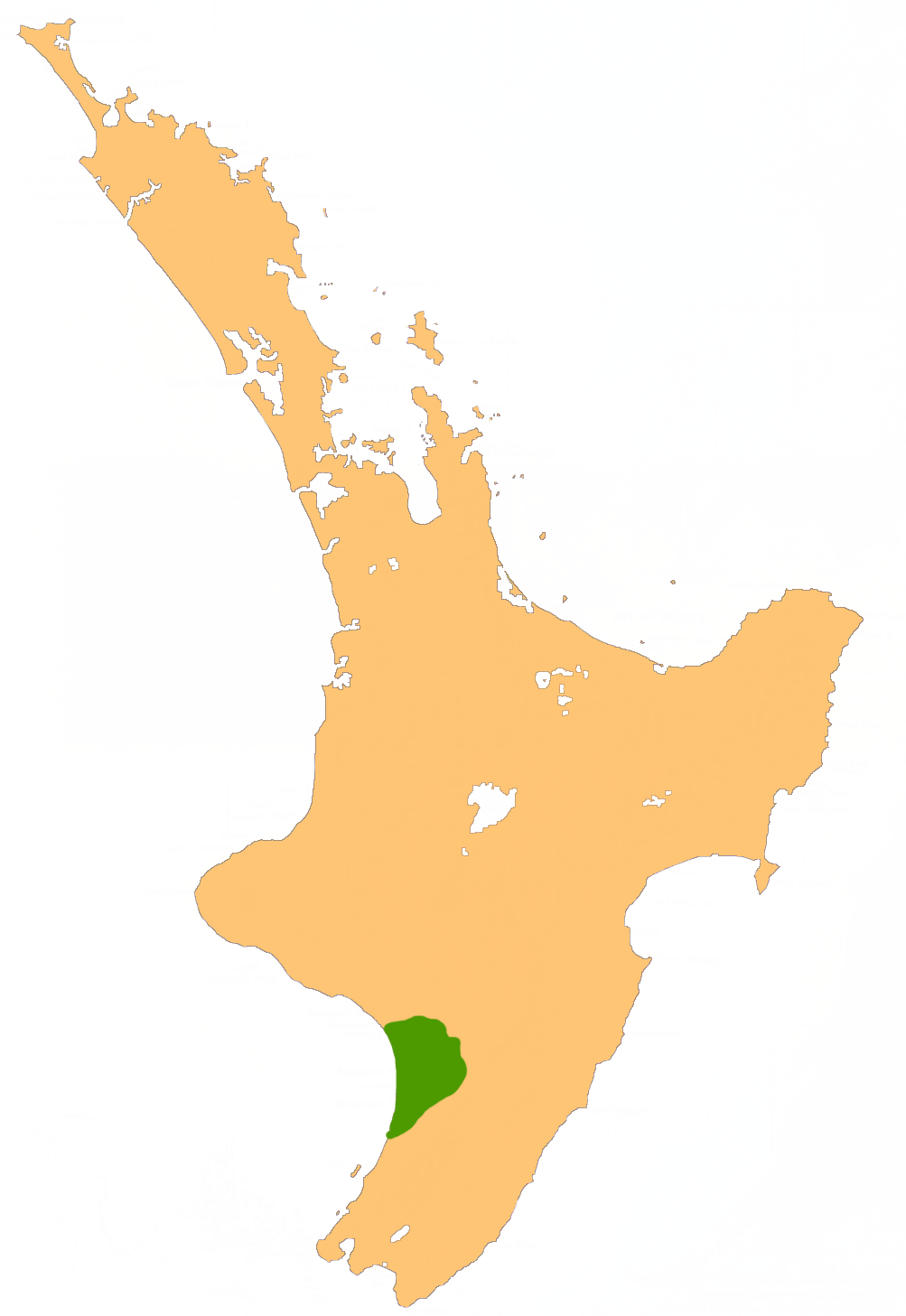
Location of the Manawatu Plains

The Manawatū Plains or Manawatū is an area of low-lying land on the floodplains of the Manawatū and Rangitīkei Rivers, in the southwestern North Island of New Zealand. It is some of the most fertile land in the country.

Stretching from the northern Horowhenua around Levin in the south to Marton in the north, the triangular area of land extends inland from the South Taranaki Bight to the base of the Tararua and Ruahine Ranges and almost as far as Ashhurst at the mouth of the Manawatū Gorge. It covers an area of around 1,000 square kilometres (390 mi^{2}).

The area was originally covered in thick bush and wetlands. Māori lived along the banks of the Manawatū River, which was the region's only access route. The area around the Manawatū Estuary at the western edge of the plains was an important early Māori site.

The dense bush started being cleared for European settlements at Palmerston North and Feilding in the 1860s. Early economic activities were based around flax and timber. Flax continued to be produced in the lower parts of the Manawatū River until after World War II, with Foxton the main centre for processing.

The Manawatū is one of the country's most fertile and intensively farmed areas, with sheep stud breeding and farming, dairy farming, cropping, market gardening and fruit orcharding. The plains provide the basis for the economy that drives the city of Palmerston North and the towns of Foxton, Feilding, and Bulls, all of which rely on agricultural revenue to an extent.

As floodplains, the land is not always entirely dry. Although the area receives slightly below the national average rainfall, floods can occur, as happened around the township of Tangimoana in early 2004. In the south, around Lake Horowhenua, the plains once included extensive wetland, which has been largely drained for dairy farming. There are conservation moves in progress to restore some of these wetlands to their former state.

The plains are within the Manawatu Ecological Region, which is divided into two ecological districts. The coastal plains are in the Foxton Ecological District, and the inland terraces and alluvial plains in the Manawatu Plains Ecological District.
