= Opiki Toll Bridge =

Derelict bridge in Opiki, New Zealand

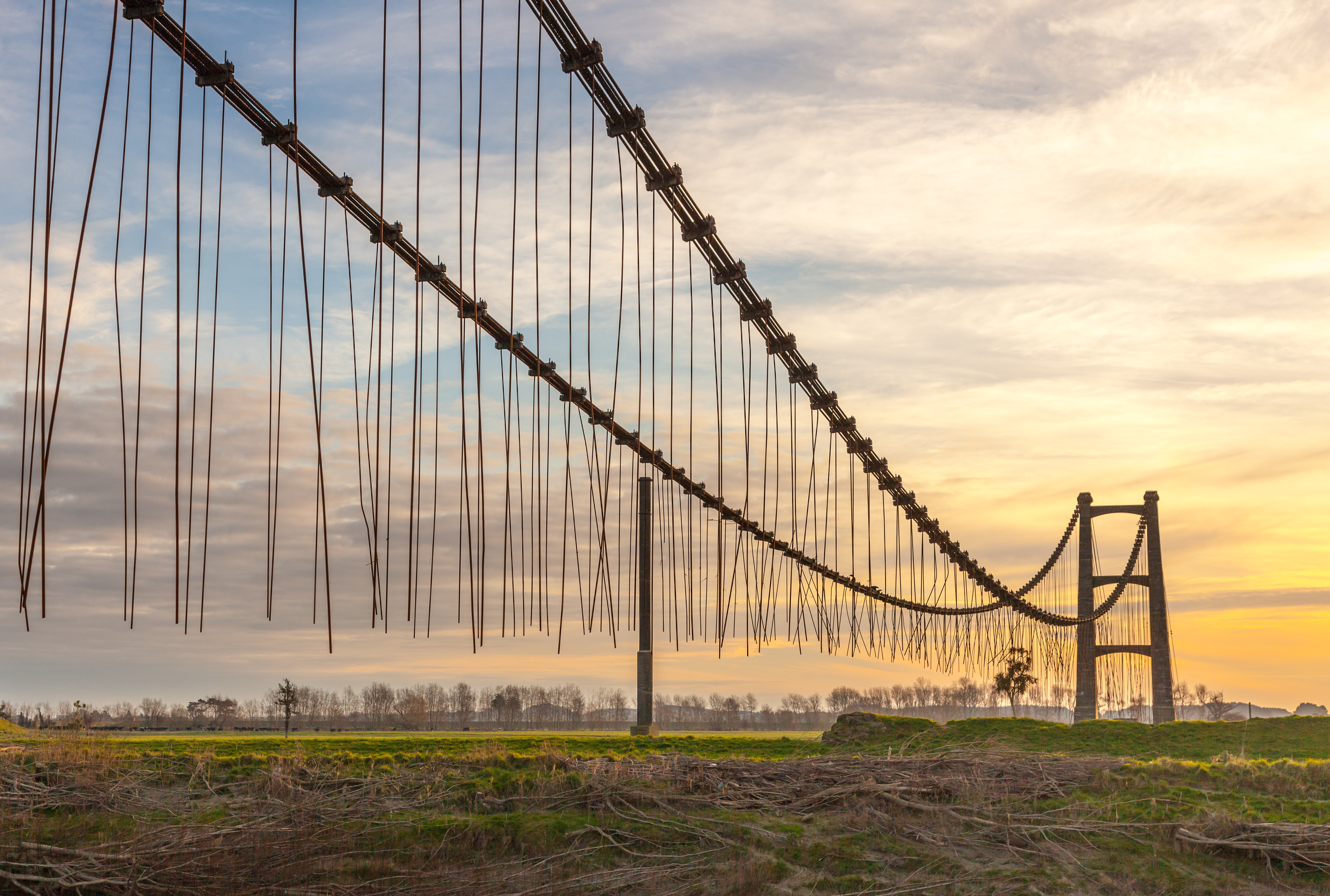
- The bridge in 2013, with the chimney in the centre background
- Coordinates: 40.431°S 175.468°E
- Crosses: Manawatū River
- Locale: Opiki, Horowhenua, New Zealand
- Other names: Akers Bridge; Rangitāne Swing Bridge; Tane Hemp Company Suspension Bridge; Tane Suspension Bridge

Characteristics
- Design: Suspension bridge
- Material: Steel, concrete
- Total length: 145.4 metres (477 ft)

History
- Designer: Joseph Dawson
- Opened: April 1918

Heritage New Zealand – Category 1
- Designated: 31 October 2013
- Reference no.: 9619

Location
- Interactive map of Opiki Toll Bridge

The Opiki Toll Bridge or the Tane Hemp Company Suspension Bridge is a derelict bridge in Opiki, Horowhenua, New Zealand, that crosses the Manawatū River. It was opened in 1918 by a local flax company and was converted to a toll road in the 1920s after the firm failed. After the State Highway 56 bridge opened across the same river in 1969, the deck of the bridge was removed. It is listed under Heritage New Zealand as a Category I historic place. With a distance of 145.4 metres (477 ft) between the bridge's towers, it had, at the time of its construction, the longest main span of a bridge in New Zealand.

== History ==
After the Tane Hemp Company was established in 1915 by local flax companies, the firm built the bridge across the Manawatū River at Opiki from March 1917 to January 1918 due to difficulty accessing the local railway station. The bridge's designer, Joseph Dawson, was reportedly a self taught engineer and was not certified. He claimed that his bridges could last 200 years. Despite his lack of qualifications, the bridge was structurally sound and survived the destructive 1934 Pahiatua earthquake, but another one of his bridges, in the Wairarapa, collapsed in 1922. The towers are 145.4 metres (477 ft) apart, which made it the bridge with the longest main span in New Zealand at the time of its construction, surpassing the Clifden Suspension Bridge at 111.5 metres (366 ft). It was also the country's longest suspension road bridge at the time. The bridge's towers have a height of 19 metres (62 ft) from the bridge's deck. The suspension cables were recycled from an old gold mine in Waihi, which is in the Waikato region. The bridge opened in April 1918 at a cost of £3000. That year the business also built a new concrete chimney for steam exhaust, in order to upgrade its mill.

Tane Hemp Company closed in 1921 due to yellow leaf flax disease and a decrease in demand for flax after the end of World War I. The flax mills were then demolished and the area was converted from swampland to farmland. The bridge remained and came under the ownership of Hugh Akers, one of the founders of the company. In order to pay for the bridge's maintenance, it was converted to a toll bridge. It was New Zealand's only privately owned highway bridge. After the State Highway 56 bridge across the same river opened in 1969, the Manawatu Catchment Board removed the decking and stiffening trusses due to safety concerns. The approximate 20-metre-tall flax mill chimney remains nearby, but is not functional and is kept as a monument.

In 2003 Heritage New Zealand placed a stone cairn near the bridge, topped with a plaque to explain the history of both the bridge and the local flax industry. In 2013 the bridge was listed by Heritage New Zealand as a Category I historic place. The bridge is also heritage listed by the Manawatū and Horowhenua District Councils.

The bridge has deteriorated over the years due to a lack of maintenance. In September 2023, one side of the bridge's cables fell into the river. They were brought back onto the bridge in March 2024. In December 2025 one of the cables failed in high winds. As a result, Horizons Regional Council removed all of the bridge's cables in February 2026, first by removing the tension, then cutting them off at both ends of the bridge and then moving them to a nearby paddock. The removal cost about $70,000.

== Gallery ==
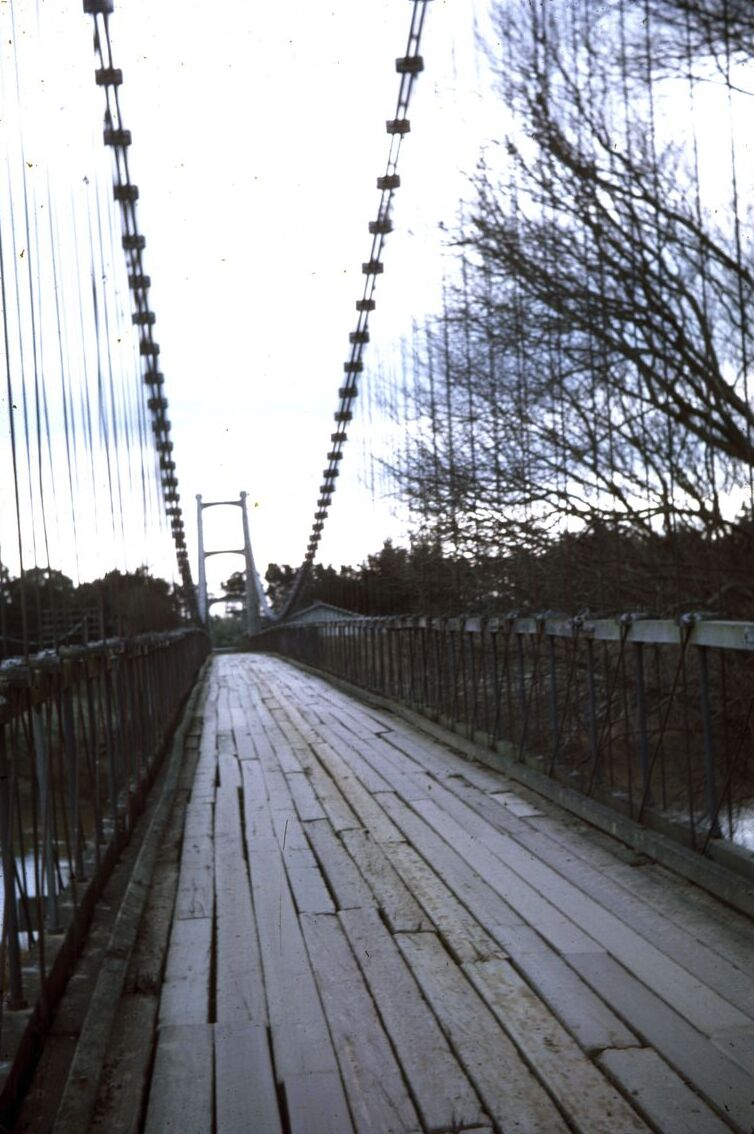
Decking, 1963

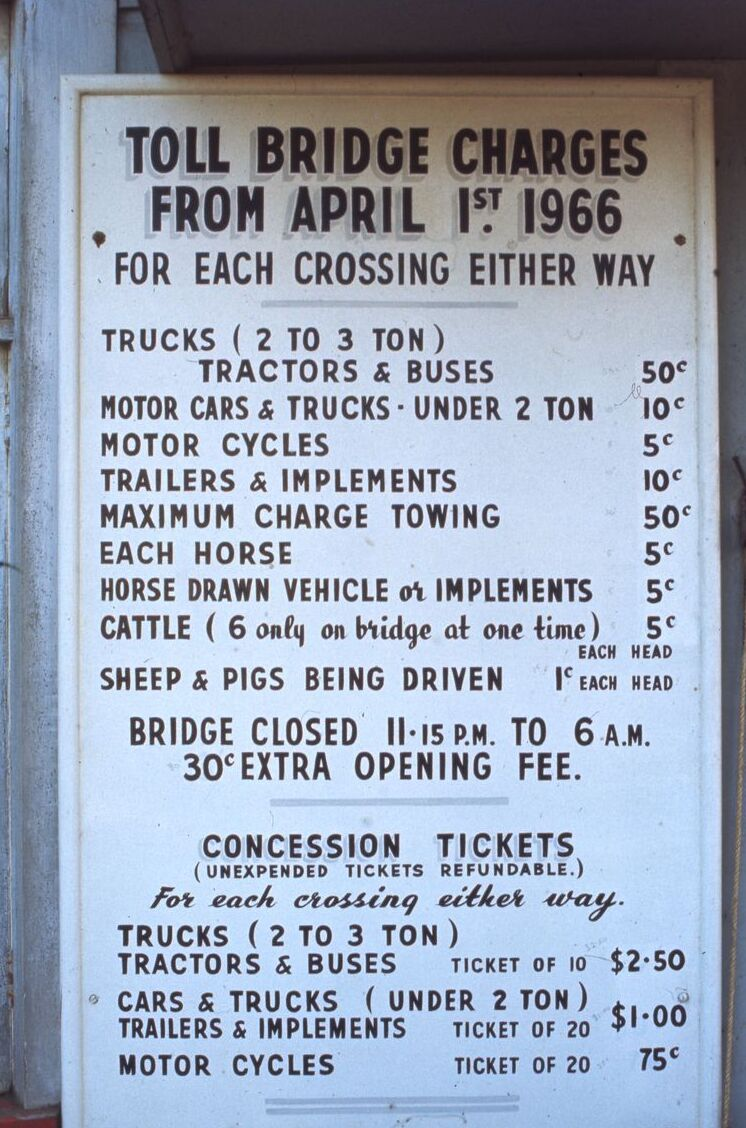
Toll prices c. 1966

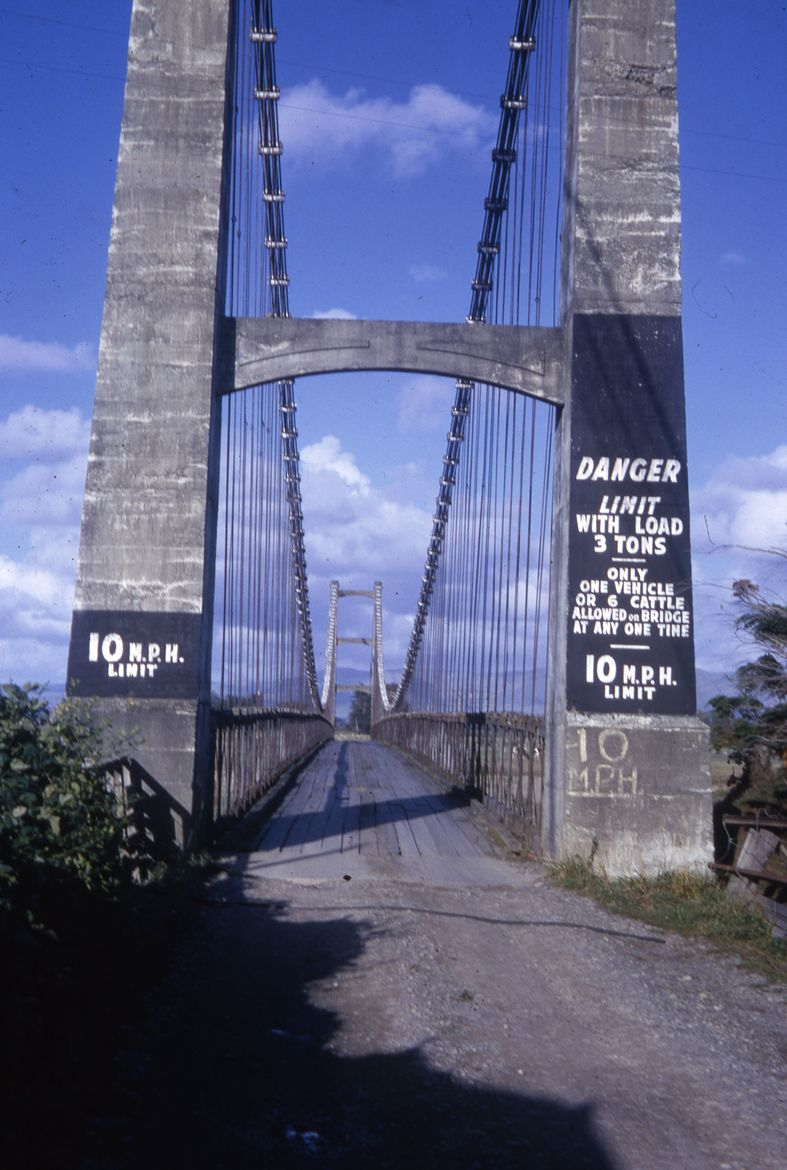
Bridge entrance, 1970s

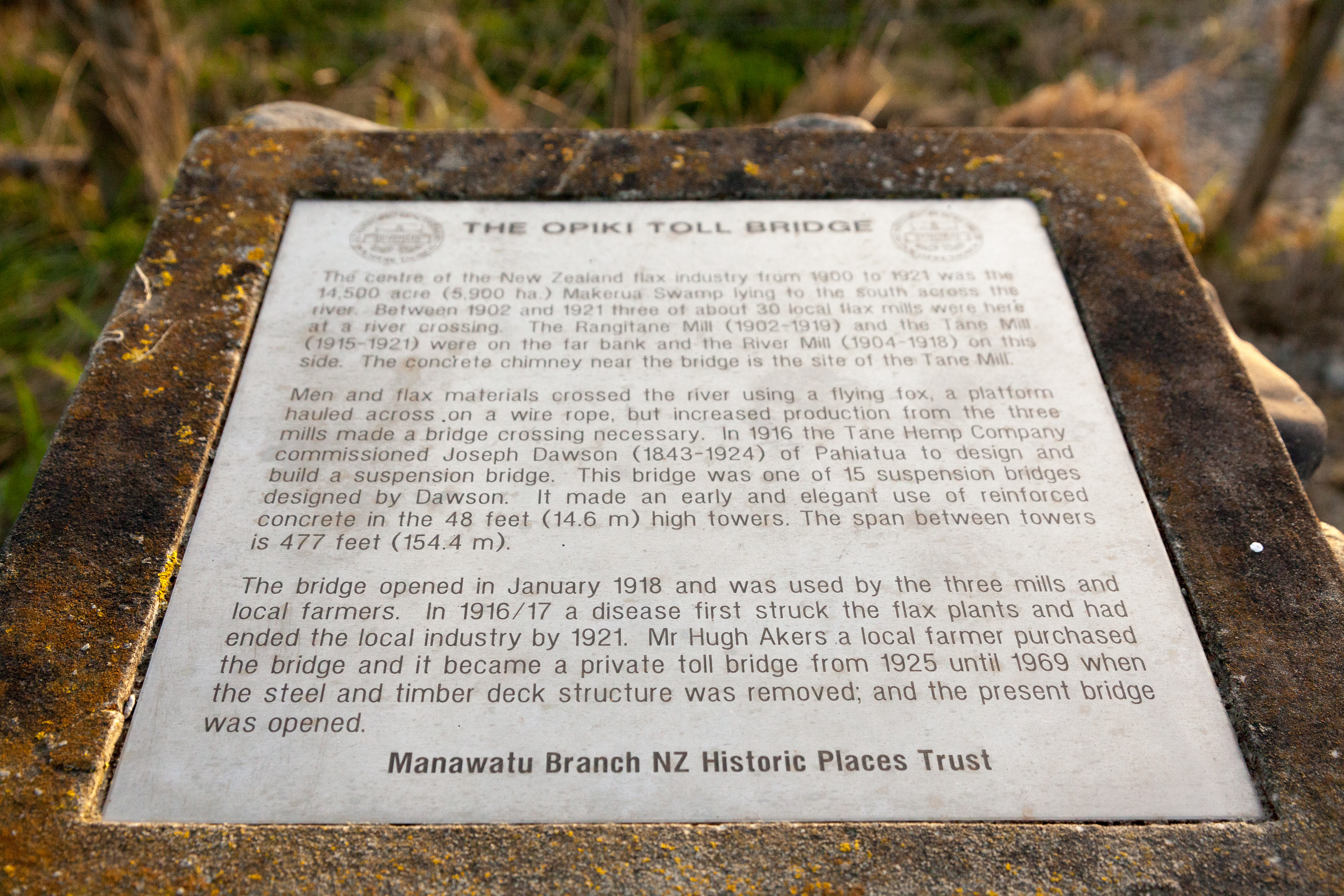
Plaque of the stone cairn
