= Linton railway station, Palmerston North =

Defunct railway station in New Zealand

Linton railway station
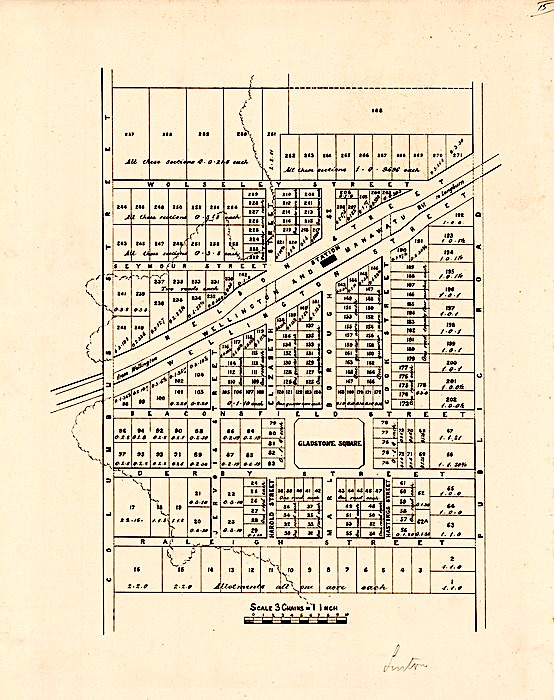
- Linton plan 1885. The station was to be in the centre of the town, but only Cook St was built

General information
- Location: Linton Station Road, Linton, New Zealand
- Coordinates: 40.426941°S 175.54665°E
- Elevation: 18 m (59 ft)
- Line: North Island Main Trunk
- Distance: Wellington 124.22 km (77.19 mi)

History
- Opened: 7 July 1885
- Closed: 19 November 1972

Services
| Preceding station | Historical railways | Following station |
|---|---|---|
| Longburn; Line open, station closed 5.72 km (3.55 mi) | North Island Main Trunk; KiwiRail | Tokomaru; Line open, station closed 5.66 km (3.52 mi) |
Location

Linton railway station was a flag station at Linton in Palmerston North on the North Island Main Trunk in New Zealand.

It was opened by the Wellington and Manawatu Railway Company on 7 July 1885; closed to passengers on 21 January 1971 and closed to goods traffic on 19 November 1972. Only a passing loop remains.

== History ==
By March 1885 the first 9 mi (14 km) of the WMR from Longburn had been built, which included Linton and Tokomaru. It may therefore have opened for goods in July 1885, but there was no regular passenger service for another year. A special train ran from Longburn to Ohau in April 1886. From Monday 2 August 1886 WMR trains started to run between Longburn and Ōtaki. Linton was shown in the time and fare-tables, but only as a flag station. The first through train from Wellington to Palmerston North ran on 30 November 1886.

Linton was intended to be a township and raise capital for building the railway. Only a small fraction of the planned development was implemented, though the original concept can still be seen in a modern map of land holdings at Linton. The result was that the station was on the edge of a very small settlement. Another attempt to sell land was made in 1897.

However, a goods shed was built in 1890 and enlarged to 40 ft (12 m) by 20 ft (6.1 m), with a verandah, in 1910. The station was improved in 1909, so that by 1911 it also had a shelter shed, platform, cart approach, cattle and sheep yards and a passing loop for 46 wagons (extended in 1912 to 68 wagons, so Napier mail trains could cross at Linton, in 1940 to 90 wagons and in 1964 to 114 wagons). In 1912 a tablet office and loading bank were added and a porter employed.

Railway houses were built in 1895, 1903, 1912, 1938 and 1946.

In the early twentieth century McGregor Brothers' horse-powered tramway was built up above the swamp on rough timber. The 7 mi (11 km)-long tramway brought timber to the station from a mill in the Tararua Range. Moturimu Mill and tramway were sold in 1911.

On 13 November 1942 a 2 mi 18 ch (3.6 km) private siding to serve Linton Camp was opened, to carry troops to and from the camp by special trains. The track came from lifting the Mount Maunganui line and the ballast from Kakariki.

In 1968 old buildings were removed and on 19 November 1972 Linton closed to all but private siding traffic.
