= Maropea River =

Coordinates: 39.674008°S 176.089131°E

Location
- Country: New Zealand

Physical characteristics
- Source
  - location: Ruahine Range
- Mouth
  - location: Whakaurekou River
- Length: 15 km (9.3 mi)

The Maropea River is a river of the Manawatū-Whanganui region of New Zealand's North Island. It flows northwest from the Ruahine Range to join the Whakaurekou River 25 kilometres (16 mi) east of Taihape.

== See also ==
- List of rivers of New Zealand
