= Pourangaki River =

- Pourangaki River location
- Native name: Pourangaki (Māori)

Location
- Country: New Zealand
- Region: Manawatū-Whanganui
- District: Rangitikei District

Physical characteristics
- Source: Taumataomekura
  - location: Ruahine Range
  - coordinates: 39°53′13″S 176°6′43″E
  - elevation: 1,500 m (4,900 ft)
- Mouth: Kawhatau River
  - coordinates: 39°48′37″S 175°57′42″E
  - elevation: 430 m (1,410 ft)
- Length: 23 km (14 mi)

Basin features
- Progression: Pourangaki River → Kawhatau River → Rangitīkei River
- River system: Rangitīkei River

The Pourangaki River is a river of the Manawatū-Whanganui region of New Zealand's North Island. It flows northwest from sources in the Ruahine Range, reaching the Kawhatau River 13 kilometres (8 mi) east of Mangaweka.

== See also ==
- List of rivers of New Zealand
