= Tamaki River (Manawatū-Whanganui) =

- Etymology: Tamaki River

Location
- Country: New Zealand

Physical characteristics
- Source
  - location: Ruahine Range
  - elevation: 1,258 m (4,127 ft)
- Mouth
  - location: Manawatū River
  - coordinates: 40.262357°S 176.06855°E
  - elevation: 150 m (490 ft)
- Length: 30 km (19 mi)
- Discharge
  - average: 200 L (44 imp gal)/sec

The Tamaki River is a river in the Manawatū-Whanganui region of New Zealand's North Island. Tamaki River starts at the confluence of two parallel rivers, the Tamaki River West and Tamaki River East Branches. The west Branch flows south from its source on the slopes of Takapari, in the Ruahine Range.

Dannevirke's water supply has run 4 mi (6.4 km) in a pipeline (until 1938 in an open race), from a weir on the Tamaki River, since 1897.

Water quality is measured at Tamaki Reserve, where Tamaki River West flows out of the bush, and just upstream of the confluence with the Manawatū. Since the 1970s there has been conversion from sheep to dairy farming and associated irrigation. Some farms have fencing to keep stock out of the river, but in 2010 cows were still able to get in Tamaki River East.

Dwarf galaxias and trout are in Tamaki River West.

The valleys in the Ruahine Range are used by hunters and trampers. Stanfield Hut is beside the upper Tamaki River West and can be reached along Homes Ridge Track, or by Stanfield Hut Route, along the river bed.

Several bridges cross the river, including Bridge 140 of the Palmerston North-Gisborne Line and bridge 7789 on SH2. The river runs beside Dannevirke Aerodrome.
