= Mangawharariki River =

River in New Zealand

Coordinates: 39.803367°S 175.811420°E

Location
- Country: New Zealand

Physical characteristics
- Source
  - location: Ruahine Range
- Mouth
  - location: Rangitikei River
- Length: 24 km (15 mi)

The Mangawharariki River is a river of the Manawatū-Whanganui region of New Zealand's North Island. It flows northwest from the Ruahine Range to meet the Rangitikei River at Mangaweka.

== See also ==
- List of rivers of New Zealand
