= Pohangina River =

River in New Zealand

Coordinates: 40°18′S 175°46′E

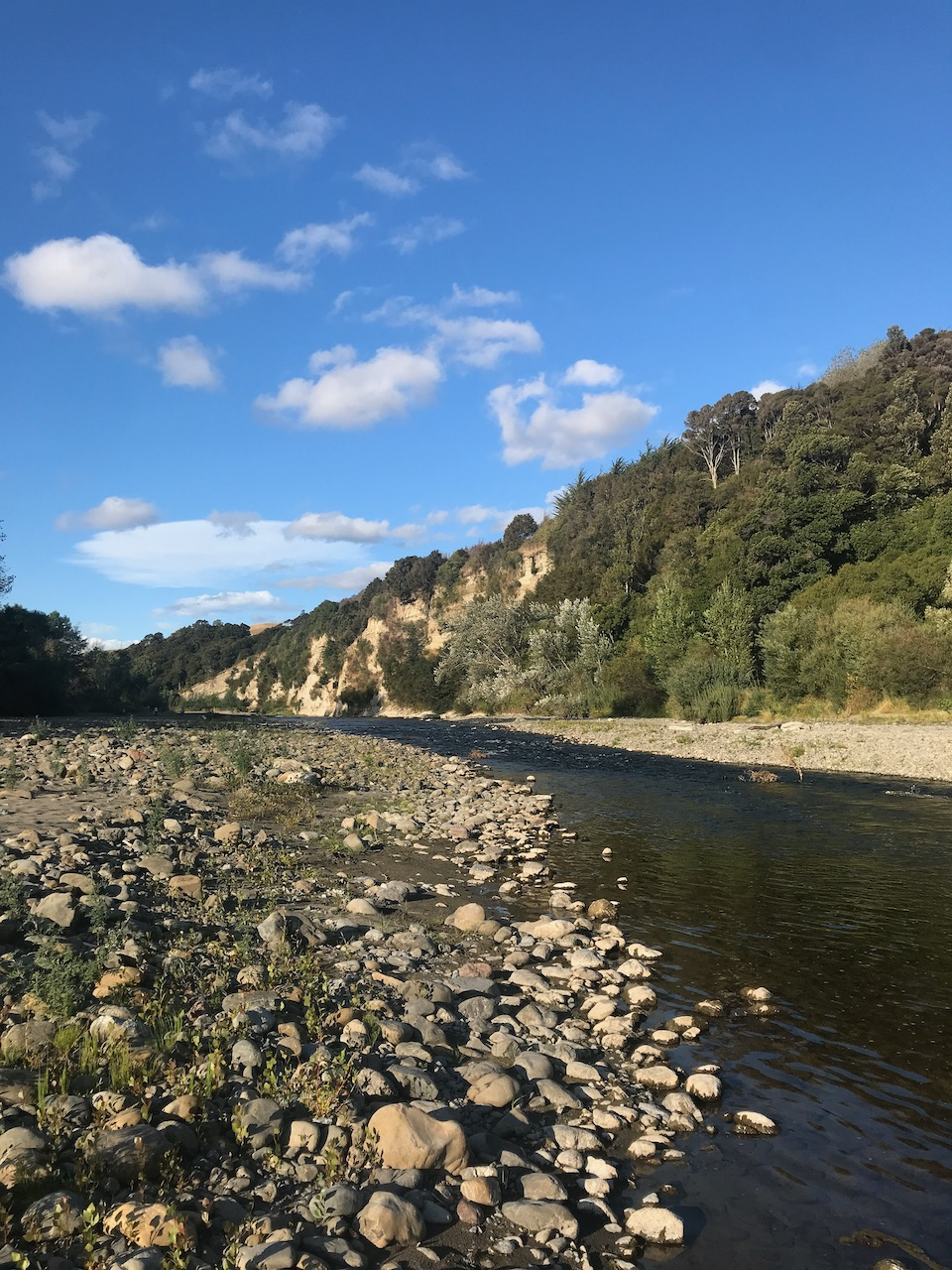
The Pohangina River at the Saddle Road bridge, Ashhurst

The Pohangina River is a river of the southwestern North Island of New Zealand. A tributary of the Manawatū River, it flows generally southward from its source in the Ruahine Range, through Pohangina, joining the Manawatū River about 15 kilometres (9 mi) northeast of Palmerston North at Ashhurst.

Brown and (rarely) rainbow trout live in the river but are rare above the Centre Creek confluence. The headwaters of the river above the Cattle Creek confluence are home to small numbers of whio (blue duck; Hymenolaimus malacorhynchus).

== Tourist spots ==
=== Totara Reserve Regional Park ===
In the area is the Totara Reserve Regional Park. It covers 340 ha of bush and many other tourist attractions. It also includes a safe spot for swimming.
