= Mangatoro River =

Coordinates: 40°15′S 176°12′E

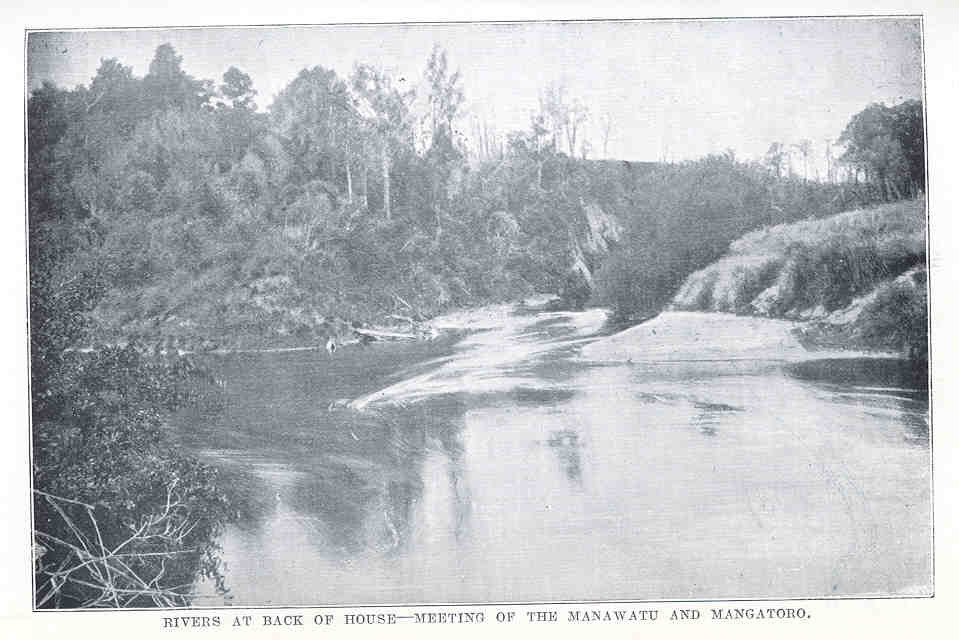

Location
- Country: New Zealand

Physical characteristics
- Mouth
  - location: Manawatū River

The Mangatoro River or Mangatoro Stream is a river of the Tararua District, in the Manawatu Wanganui Region of New Zealand. It runs northeast along the western edge of the Puketoi Range to reach the Manawatū River south of Dannevirke at Okarae.

== See also ==
- List of rivers of New Zealand
