= Kawhātau River =

River in New Zealand

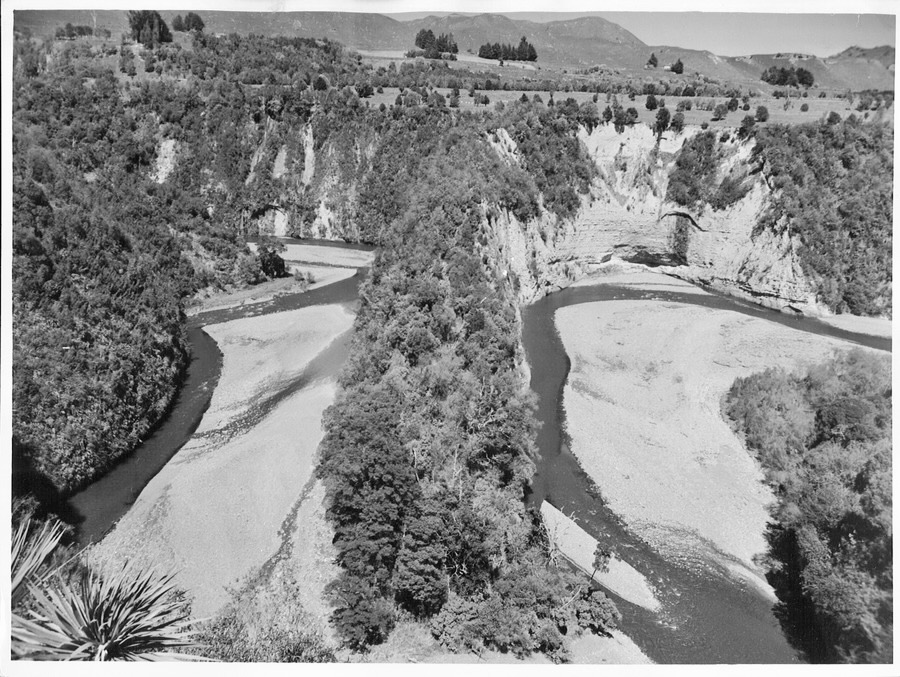
- Kawhātau River in 1954
- Native name: Kawhātau (Māori)

Location
- Region: Manawatū-Whanganui
- District: Rangitikei District

Physical characteristics
- Source: Ohuinga
  - location: Ruahine Range
  - coordinates: 39.85920°S 176.13065°E
  - elevation: 1686m
- Mouth: Rangitīkei River
  - coordinates: 39°46′27″S 175°48′30″E
  - elevation: 365m
- Length: 55 km (34 mi)
- Basin size: 23,000ha

Basin features
- River system: Rangitikei River
- Tributaries
  - left: Pourangaki River

The Kawhātau River is a river of about 55 km (34 mi) in the southwestern North Island of New Zealand. Its source is in the Ruahine Range and its outflow is into the larger Rangitīkei River, which it meets close to Mangaweka. It was given the official name of Kawhātau River in 2020. It is joined by the Pourangaki River at Upper Kawhātau.

== Geology ==
Like other parts of the Rangitīkei River system, the Kawhātau has been incised into the soft Quaternary, 3.5 to 1.7 million year old marine mudstones and sandstones, as the land has risen since the last ice age. A large proportion of the sediment in the Rangitīkei comes from the Kawhātau. Gravel has long been taken from the river.

== History ==
Māori skeletons and moa bones were discovered near the river when the bush was being burnt.

Felling of bush in the valley was first begun by 12 settlers from Timaru on 1,000 acres (400 ha) in 1895. At that time the only access was by a cage suspended on a 380 ft (120 m) wire rope across the Rangitīkei from Mangaweka (then called Three Log Whare). Kawhātau Valley Road was being built by 1898. Sawmilling of totara started about 1900 By 1905 it was also milling mataī and kahikatea. St Stephen's Anglican church was built about 1917. Possum were released into the bush in 1923 at Hinakura. The area is now mainly one of sheep and beef farming, plus 3 commercial fruit and vegetable growers.

== Bridges ==
The river was bridged between 1979 and 1981 by the NIMT railway, as part of the Mangaweka deviation, with a 110 m (360 ft) prestressed concrete box girder, plus end spans, giving a total length of 182 m (597 ft), 70 m (230 ft) above the river. It is the 6th highest railway bridge in the country. The next bridge upstream carries Potaka Road and replaced a ford in 1908. The uppermost bridge is on Rangitane Road and was built about 1922 and replaced in 1974.

== Wildlife ==
Plants found in the valley in 2000 included Mazus novaezeelandiae (dwarf musk), Anemanthele lessoniana (gossamer grass), Trisetum drucei (tufted grass), Scandia rosifolia, Azorella hookeri, Rubus squarrosus (bush lawyer), Trisetum lepidum (3-bristled grass), Uncinia leptostachya (hook-sedge), Asplenium flabellifolium (necklace fern), Korthalsella lindsayi (leafless mistletoe), Myoporum laetum (Ngaio), Olearia paniculata (Akiraho), Lastreopsis velutina (shieldfern) and Schoenus pauciflorus(Sedge tussock).

== Walks ==
A circuit of the upper valley can be walked in 2, or 3 days, using Kawhatau Base, a former Forest Service hut at the foot of the Hikurangi Range, and Crow Hut. However, since 2016, landowners have closed routes to access the upper valley.

== Schools ==
Kawhātau School opened in 1896. Pourangaki School opened in 1920.
