= Mangamaire River =

- Location within New Zealand
- Etymology: Māori meaning "maire stream"
- Native name: Mangamaire (Māori)

Location
- Country: New Zealand
- Region: Manawatū-Whanganui
- District: Rangitikei

Physical characteristics
- Source: Kaimanawa Range
  - coordinates: 39°6′32″S 176°3′25″E
  - elevation: 1,360 m (4,460 ft)
- Mouth: Rangitīkei River
  - coordinates: 39°16′59″S 176°0′14″E
  - elevation: 790 m (2,590 ft)
- Length: 29 km (18 mi)

Basin features
- Progression: Mangamaire River → Rangitīkei River
- River system: Rangitīkei River
- Tributaries
  - left: Mangatawai Stream, Te Piri Stream

The Mangamaire River is a river of the centre of New Zealand's North Island. One of the headwaters of the Rangitikei River system, it flows generally southwest from its origins southeast of Lake Taupō, forming part of the border of the Kaimanawa Forest Park for much of its length. It meets the young Rangitikei in hill country 40 kilometres (25 mi) east of Mount Ruapehu.

The New Zealand Ministry for Culture and Heritage gives a translation of "maire stream" for Mangamaire.

== See also ==
- List of rivers of New Zealand
