= Aohanga River =

- River mouth photographed in November 1958
- Route of the Aohanga River
- Mouth of the Aohanga River Aohanga River (North Island)
- Native name: Aohanga (Māori)

Location
- Country: New Zealand
- Island: North Island
- Region: Manawatū-Whanganui
- District: Tararua

Physical characteristics
- Source: Near Waihoki
  - coordinates: 40.637°S 176.137°E
- Mouth: Pacific Ocean
  - coordinates: 40°40′43″S 176°21′04″E
  - elevation: Sea level
- Length: 58 km (36 mi)

Basin features
- Progression: Aohanga River → Pacific Ocean
- Cities: Aohanga
- Tributaries
  - left: Mangatiti Stream, Pongaroa River, Waiotiaki Stream
  - right: Waihoki Stream, Waioakura Stream, Waingongoro Stream
- Waterfalls: Mangatiti Falls
- Bridges: Huia Road bridge, Coast Road bridge (near Waikakahi Road), Coast Road bridge west of 1815 Coast Road, Coast Road bridge east of 1815 Coast Road, Coast Road bridge west of 2205 Coast Road

The Aohanga River, also called the Owahanga River, is a river in the Tararua District, in the Manawatū-Whanganui Region of New Zealand's North Island. Its tortuous course winds generally southeast through rough hill country, reaching the sea 30 km (19 mi) southwest of Cape Turnagain.

== Geography ==
The river flows southeast from near the Waihoki Valley into the Pacific Ocean. The Pongaroa River is a major tributary of the river. The village of Aohanga is found on the right bank of the river mouth.

== History ==
The river has cultural significance for Ngāti Kahungunu ki Wairarapa. The name refers to a legendary taniwha found under a rock at the mouth of the river, a cautionary tale indicating the dangerous currents found at the river mouth. Previously known as the Owahanga River, the river was given the official name Aohanga River in 2023 due to the Ngati Kahungunu ki Wairarapa Tamaki nui-a-Rua Claims Settlement Act 2022, which recognised the misspelling of the river's name.

The river is part of Owāhanga Station, a farm that has been in Māori ownership since its establishment. Leased to European farmers R.D Rodgers and M. Greenwood, after their lease expired in 1930, the farm became managed directly by members of the Ngāti Kahungunu ki Wairarapa hapū Te Hika o Papauma.

The river and surrounding farmlands were damaged in 2023 due to the effects of Cyclone Gabrielle.

== See also ==
- List of rivers of New Zealand
