= Pongaroa River =

- Route of the Pongaroa River
- Mouth of the Pongaroa River Pongaroa River (North Island)
- Etymology: Māori meaning "tall tree fern"
- Native name: Pongaroa (Māori)

Location
- Country: New Zealand
- Island: North Island
- Region: Manawatū-Whanganui
- District: Tararua

Physical characteristics
- Source: Puketoi Range
  - coordinates: 40.477°S 176.11°E
- Mouth: Aohanga River
  - coordinates: 40°35′02″S 176°13′41″E
  - elevation: 70 metres (230 ft)
- Length: 32 km (20 mi)

Basin features
- Progression: Pongaroa River → Aohanga River → Pacific Ocean
- Cities: Pongaroa
- Bridges: Waihi Valley Road bridge, Pongaroa Bridge (Route 52), Coast Road bridge

The Pongaroa River is a river of the southern Manawatū-Whanganui region of New Zealand's North Island. It flows southeast from the Puketoi Range west of Pahiatua, reaching the Owahanga River 15 kilometres from the latter's outflow into the Pacific Ocean.

== Geography ==
The river flows through the township of Pongaroa.

== See also ==
- List of rivers of New Zealand
