= Opiki =

Locality in New Zealand

- Rural locality
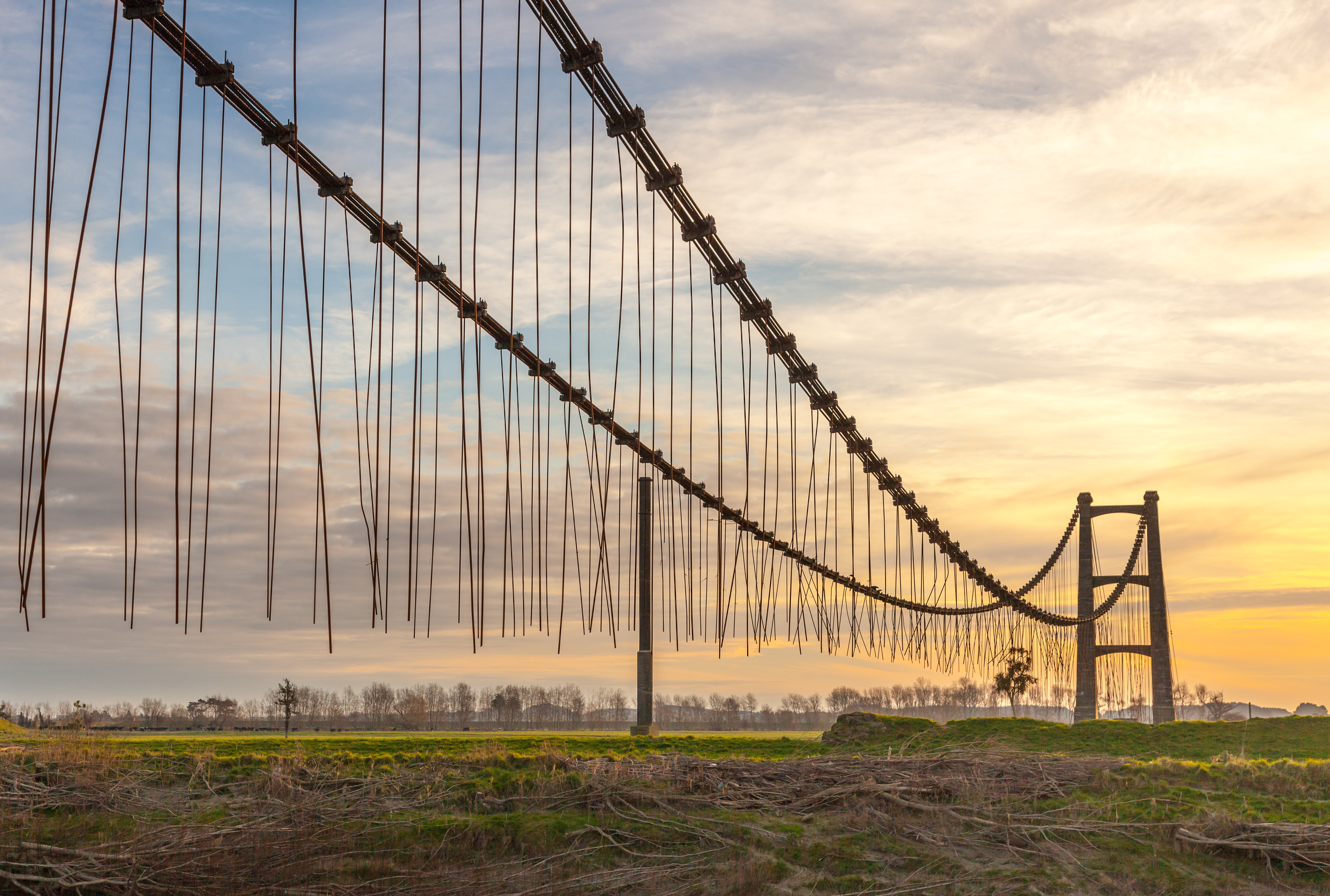
- The Opiki toll bridge over the Manawatū River was in use from 1918 to 1969.
- Interactive map of Opiki
- Coordinates: 40.4435°S 175.4589°E
- Country: New Zealand
- Region: Manawatū-Whanganui region
- Territorial authority: Horowhenua District
- Wards: Miranui General Ward; Horowhenua Māori Ward
- Electorates: Rangitīkei; Te Tai Hauāuru (Māori)

Government
  - Territorial Authority: Horowhenua District Council
  - Regional council: Horizons Regional Council
  - Horowhenua Mayor: Bernie Wanden
  - Rangitīkei MP: Suze Redmayne
  - Te Tai Hauāuru MP: Debbie Ngarewa-Packer

Area
  - Total: 60.51 km^{2} (23.36 sq mi)

Population (2023 Census)
  - Total: 522
  - Density: 8.63/km^{2} (22.3/sq mi)

Opiki is a rural locality in the Horowhenua district of New Zealand's North Island. It is located on the floodplain of the Manawatū River, 15 km (9 mi) southwest of Palmerston North.

The New Zealand Ministry for Culture and Heritage gives a translation of "place of climbing" for Ōpiki.

== Demographics ==
Opiki locality covers 60.51 km^{2} (23.36 sq mi). It is part of the larger Miranui statistical area.

Historical population
Year	Pop.	±% p.a.
2006	438	—
2013	384	−1.86%
2018	387	+0.16%
2023	402	+0.76%
The 2006 population is for a larger area of 61.15 km^{2}. Source:

Opiki had a population of 402 in the 2023 New Zealand census, an increase of 15 people (3.9%) since the 2018 census, and an increase of 18 people (4.7%) since the 2013 census. There were 204 males and 198 females in 141 dwellings. 3.0% of people identified as LGBTIQ+. There were 93 people (23.1%) aged under 15 years, 75 (18.7%) aged 15 to 29, 183 (45.5%) aged 30 to 64, and 48 (11.9%) aged 65 or older.

People could identify as more than one ethnicity. The results were 75.4% European (Pākehā), 12.7% Māori, 3.7% Pasifika, 17.2% Asian, and 1.5% other, which includes people giving their ethnicity as "New Zealander". English was spoken by 96.3%, Māori by 5.2%, Samoan by 0.7%, and other languages by 12.7%. No language could be spoken by 3.0% (e.g. too young to talk). New Zealand Sign Language was known by 0.7%. The percentage of people born overseas was 20.1, compared with 28.8% nationally.

Religious affiliations were 37.3% Christian, 0.7% Hindu, 1.5% Buddhist, and 0.7% New Age. People who answered that they had no religion were 51.5%, and 7.5% of people did not answer the census question.

Of those at least 15 years old, 54 (17.5%) people had a bachelor's or higher degree, 186 (60.2%) had a post-high school certificate or diploma, and 69 (22.3%) people exclusively held high school qualifications. 27 people (8.7%) earned over $100,000 compared to 12.1% nationally. The employment status of those at least 15 was 174 (56.3%) full-time, 48 (15.5%) part-time, and 9 (2.9%) unemployed.

== Education ==
Ōpiki School is a co-educational full state primary school serving students from years 1 to 8, with a roll of 114 as of July 2026. It opened in 1928.
