= Manawatū River =

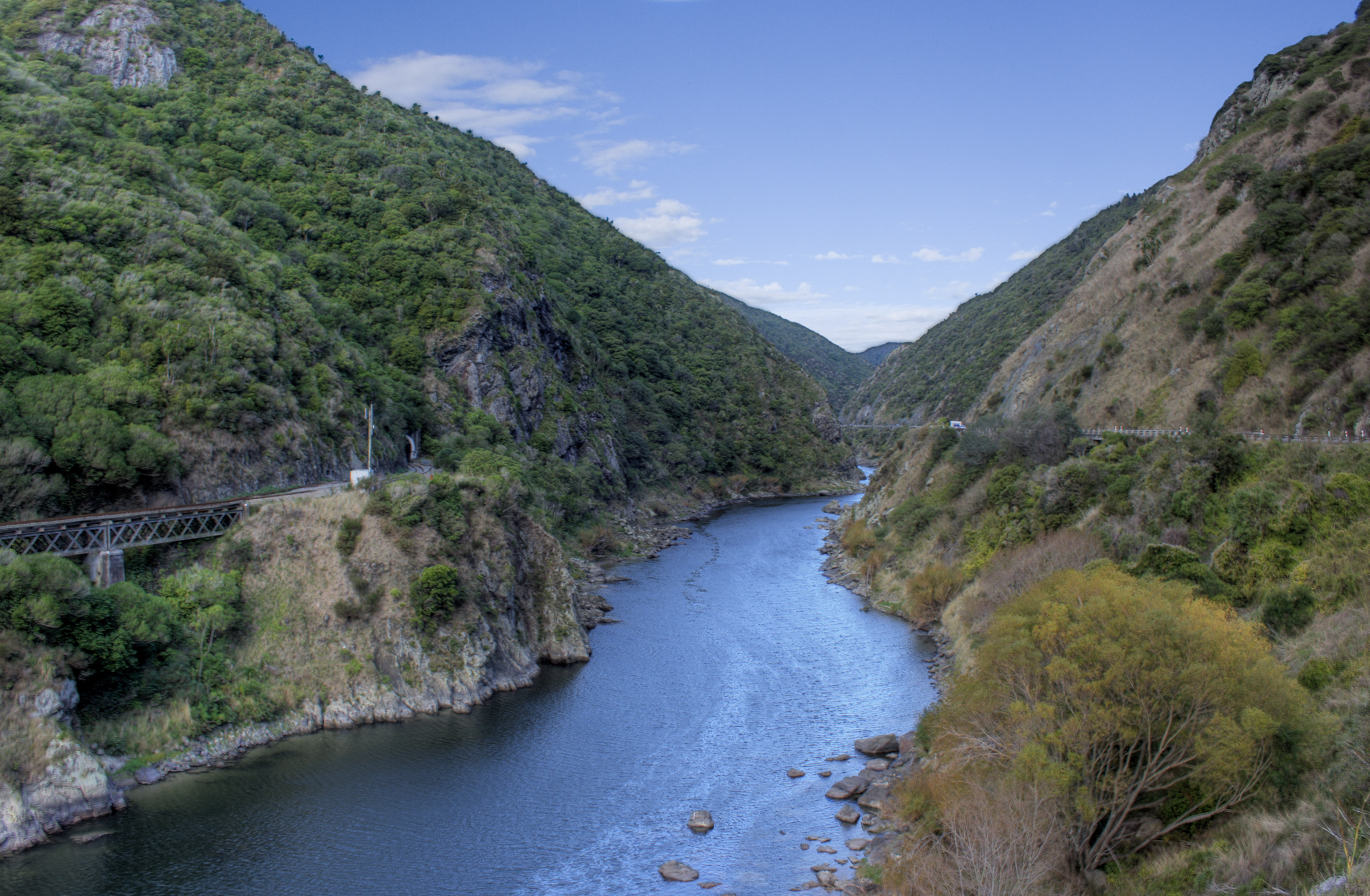
- The Manawatū Gorge

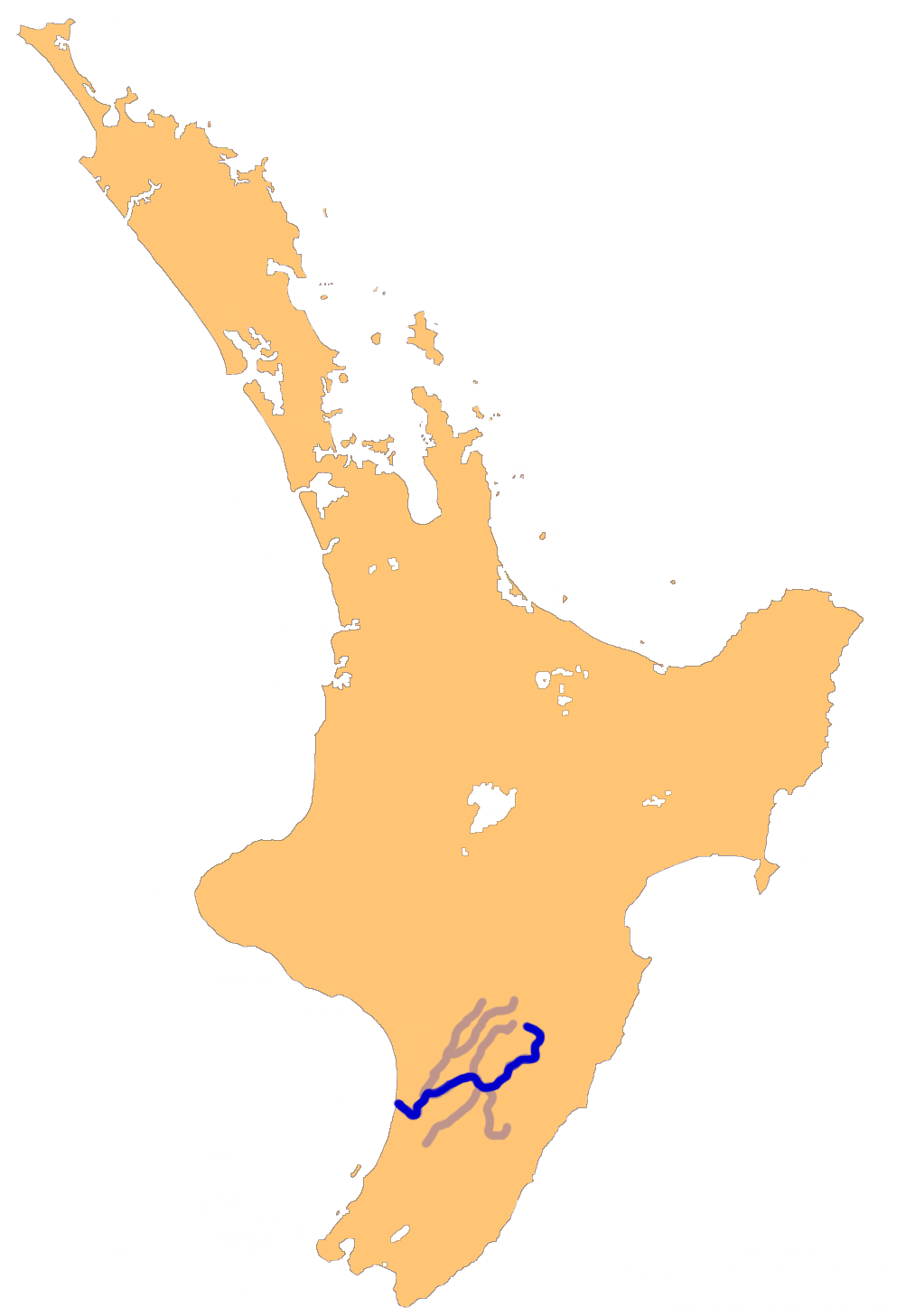
- The Manawatū River system
- Native name: Te Awa o Manawatū (Māori)

Location
- Country: New Zealand
- Region: Manawatū-Whanganui
- Cities: Palmerston North

Physical characteristics
- Source: Ruahine Ranges
  - coordinates: 40°0′53″S 176°7′1″E
- Mouth: Tasman Sea
  - location: Manawatū Estuary, Foxton Beach
  - coordinates: 40°28′S 175°13′E
  - elevation: Sea level
- Length: 180 km (110 mi)
- Basin size: 5,899 km^{2} (2,278 mi^{2})
- Discharge
  - average: 102 m^{3}/s (3,600 cu ft/s)

Basin features
- Landmarks: Manawatū Gorge, Manawatū Estuary
- Tributaries
  - left: Tamaki River, Pohangina River, Oroua River
  - right: Mangatewainui River, Mangatoro River, Tiraumea River, Mangahao, Tokomaru River

The Manawatū River is a major river of the lower North Island of New Zealand. The river flows from the Ruahine Ranges, through both the Manawatū Gorge and the city of Palmerston North, and across the Manawatū Plains to the Tasman Sea at Foxton.

== Name ==
The river, along with the more northern Whanganui River, gives its name to the Manawatū-Whanganui region. The name of the river was given by the tohunga Haupipi-a-Nanaia, a descendant of Haunui-a-paparangi. Haupipi-a-Nanaia or Hau, travelled down the west coast in pursuit of his wife Wairaka, who had eloped. When Hau reached what is now known as the Manawatū River, he is said to have stopped and clutched his chest, horrified at the prospect of crossing so mighty an expanse of water. Therefore the river's name comes from the Māori words manawa (heart) and tū (stand still). In this context, when said together, the interpretation is ‘heart standing still’ to represent how Hau felt when he first saw the river. However cross he did, and a few kilometres south of Paekākāriki, Hau overtook the fugitives and changed Wairaka into a rock.

== Geography ==
The Manawatū River has its headwaters northwest of Norsewood in the Tararua District, on the eastern slopes of the Ruahine Range on the North Island of New Zealand. It flows initially eastward before turning south-west near Ormondville, flowing 40 kilometres (25 mi) before turning north-west near Woodville. At this point it enters the Manawatū Gorge, between the Ruahine and Tararua Ranges. Beyond the gorge it joins with the Pohangina River at Ashhurst and turns south-west, flowing through the city of Palmerston North. At this stage the river is still flowing swiftly and carrying gravel from the mountains.

After Opiki, it slows and has a lower gradient, meandering over the Manawatū Plains; its bed at this point is mud and silty sand. In its meandering and frequent shifting of course it has created oxbow lakes, lagoons, and swamps. Sediment deposited along its course has created levees, higher than the surrounding plain; when the river is in flood it overflows these and creates wetlands. The Manawatū reaches the Tasman Sea at Foxton Beach, on the west coast of the North Island, creating the Manawatū Estuary.

Major tributaries of the river include the Mākākahi, Mangahao, Pohangina and Oroua Rivers. The Manawatū's total length is 180 kilometres (110 mi), making it only the 12th-longest in the country, but at 102 cubic metres per second (3,600 cu ft/s) it is one of New Zealand's greatest rivers in terms of flow, and second only to the Waikato River among North Island rivers.

=== Bridges ===
The river is crossed by 18 road bridges (not including the under-construction Parahaki Island Bridge), 3 rail bridges and He Ara Kotahi walk/cycleway. The lowest and longest, Whirokino Trestle and Manawatū River Bridge, carry SH1 1.1 km (0.68 mi) over the Moutoa Floodway and 180 m (590 ft) over the river. It replaced the 1938 and 1942 bridges in February 2020, at a cost of $70m.

The derelict Opiki Toll Bridge crosses the river and no longer has a floor. It is a Heritage New Zealand Category I historic place.

== Geology ==
The Manawatū is unique among New Zealand rivers in that it crosses a mountain range. The river has formed a "water gap" across the mountains because it is older than the Ruahine and Tararua Ranges. Most rivers arise from an already-existing range of mountains or hills, but beginning about 3 million years ago the central North Island mountain ranges began to uplift across the Manawatū's current course. Because it drained a large catchment, the river had sufficient flow to keep pace with and erode the rising mountains, eventually forming the Manawatū Gorge; other rivers were unable to and were diverted into the Manawatū instead.

After exiting the Manawatū Gorge, the river carries rock and sediment down from the mountains. During glacial times, with the prevalence of ice, snow, and bare mountains, this erosion increases and forms a stony elevated terrace. During an interglacial, while the mountains are forested, gravel outwash is reduced and the river cuts down into the terrace, forming a gorge. This cycle has created four distinct terraces between the Manawatū Gorge and Palmerston North.

The Manawatū Plain was seabed 5 to 6 million years ago, and as it was raised above water by the action of the Australian and Pacific Plates it buckled, forming five long and low ridges (or anticlines) parallel to the mountains, which impede the flow of the Manawatū, Rangitikei, and Oroua Rivers, forcing them to flow southwest rather than directly into the Tasman Sea.

== Vegetation ==
At the time of human arrival, the Manawatū Plains were covered with forest. Towards the foothills and the Manawatū Gorge grew black beech, turning into tawa forest at lower altitudes. Along the plains and terraces the forest was mixed podocarp and tōtara, changing to mixed tawa, tītoki, and māhoe in the sand dunes.

Across the flood plain of the Manawatū and on the low-lying land bordering the river, the predominant vegetation was semi-swamp forest, mostly kahikatea and pukatea. Three major swamps bordered the Manawatū: Moutoa Swamp north of the river, towards the mouth, known as the "Great Swamp" in the 19th century; Makerua Swamp further inland, to the south of the Manawatū and north of the Tokomaru River, which covered 22000 acres; and Taonui Swamp on the north side of the river. The main vegetation in the swamps was harakeke and raupō: harakeke in the drier parts, raupō in the wetter.

The Manawatū river mouth and estuary was listed under the Ramsar Convention as a Wetland of International Importance in 2005.

== Flooding ==
The Manawatū River flooded in February 2004, displacing over 3000 people (primarily from Marton and Feilding) and damaging over 1000 Manawatū farms. The cost of the flood in terms of insurance payouts was NZ$122 million. Further damage was prevented by the opening of the Moutoa floodgates, which intercept the river between Foxton and Shannon.

== Water quality ==
In 2018 a case study on water quality in the Manawatū-Whanganui region was jointly commissioned by Horizons Regional Council and the Ministry for the Environment, the study was conducted by Land Water People (LWP) and the results were reviewed by the National Institute of Water and Atmospheric Research (NIWA) and StatsNZ. Results showed that water quality for sediment and E. coli had improved over the previous seven to ten years in the Manawatū-Whanganui region. The report found strong statistical evidence of a connection between regional scale water quality improvements and local scale interventions.

In 2006 Fonterra were criticised for an application to discharge 8,500 cubic metres (300,000 cu ft) of wastewater into the Manawatū River. In 2009, the Cawthron Institute found that the river had the highest gross primary production (GPP) compared to 300 rivers and streams in the Western world. High GPP rates are an indication of poor ecological health and can lead to various environmental issues. In 2011, the Horizons Regional Council laid blame with the Palmerston North City Council for "considerable" and "sustained" breaches of one of its discharge consents, and some degree of non-compliance with two others. A report by the Ministry for the Environment ranked 76 New Zealand sites for water clarity and E. coli levels. Using those measures, they found only four other New Zealand rivers rate worse than the Manawatū (the Waitara, Whanganui, Waipā and Rangitīkei).

== Sources ==
- Knight, Catherine (2016). New Zealand's Rivers: An Environmental History. Christchurch: Canterbury University Press. ISBN 978-1-927145-76-0.
- Knight, Catherine (2014). Ravaged Beauty: An Environmental History of the Manawatu. Auckland: Dunmore Press. ISBN 978-1-927212-13-4.
