= Mākākahi River =

River in New Zealand's North Island

Coordinates: 40°42′29″S 175°34′12″E

The Mākākahi River runs through the Manawatū-Whanganui region of the North Island of New Zealand.

From its headwaters south of Eketāhuna it flows northwest alongside State Highway 2 for 40 kilometres (25 mi) before feeding into the Mangatainoka River near Pahiatua.
