= Tokomaru River =

Coordinates: 40°32′S 175°24′E

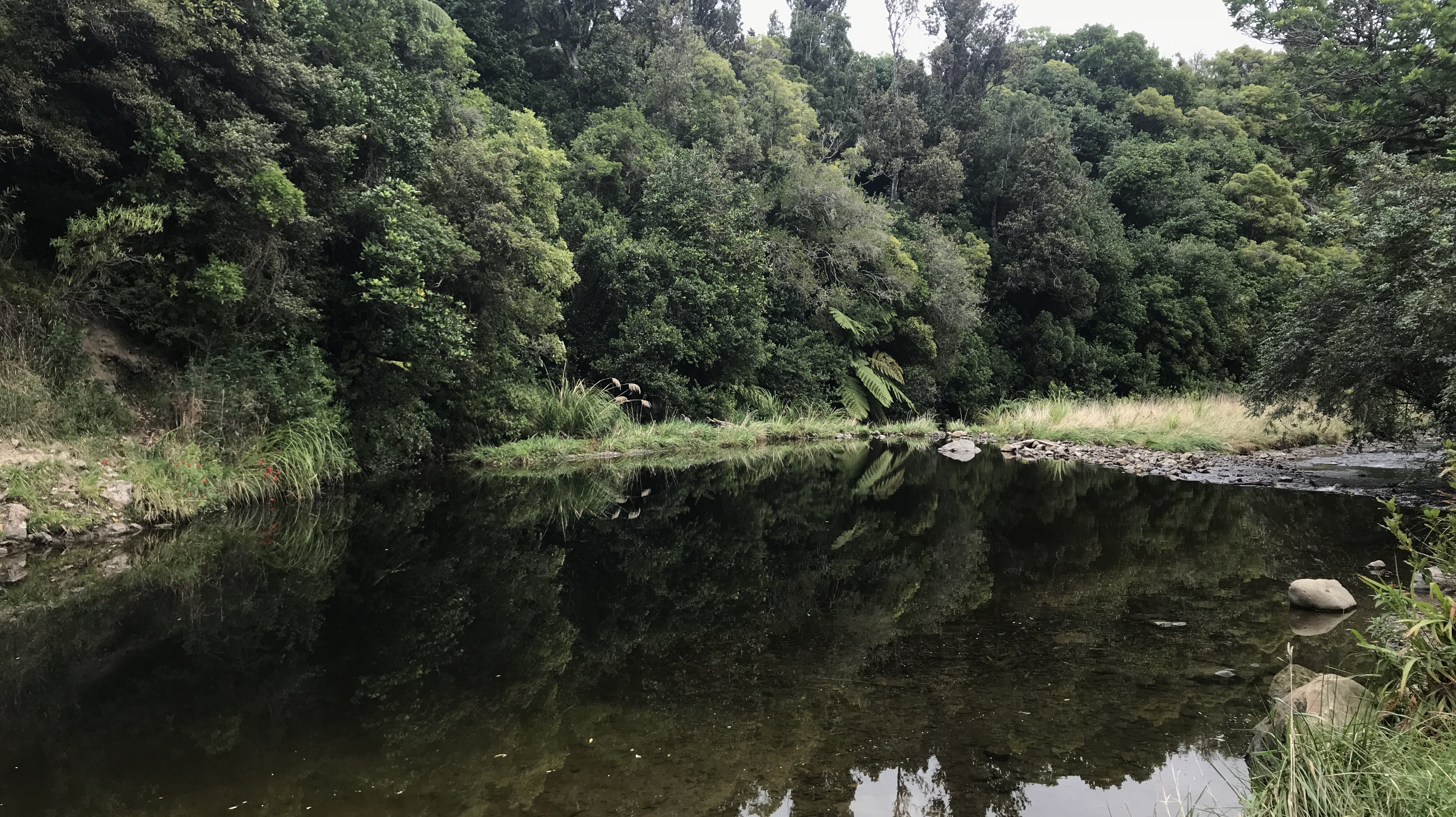
- Tokomaru River at Horseshoe Bend Reserve

Location
- Country: New Zealand

Physical characteristics
- Source
  - location: Tararua Range
- Mouth
  - location: Manawatū River
- Length: 27 km (17 mi)

The Tokomaru River is a river of the Manawatū-Whanganui Region of the North Island of New Zealand. It rises to the southeast of Shannon and initially flows northeast down a long valley in the Tararua Range before turning northwest to reach the edge of the Manawatū Plain near the town of Tokomaru. From there it turns southwest, reaching the Manawatū River 3 km (1.9 mi) north of Shannon.

== See also ==
- List of rivers of New Zealand
