= Whakaurekou River =

Coordinates: 39°39′S 176°04′E

Location
- Country: New Zealand

Physical characteristics
- Source
  - location: Ruahine Range
- Mouth
  - location: Rangitikei River
- Length: 12 km (7.5 mi)

The Whakaurekou River is a river of the Manawatū-Whanganui region of New Zealand's North Island. It flows northwest from its origins in the Ruahine Range to reach the Rangitikei River 25 kilometres (16 mi) east of Taihape.

== See also ==
- List of rivers of New Zealand
