= Rangitīkei River =

River in New Zealand

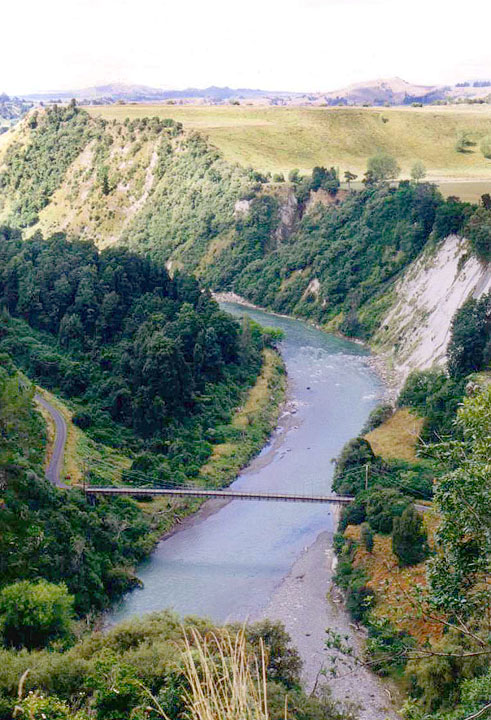
- Mangarere suspension bridge south of Mangaweka

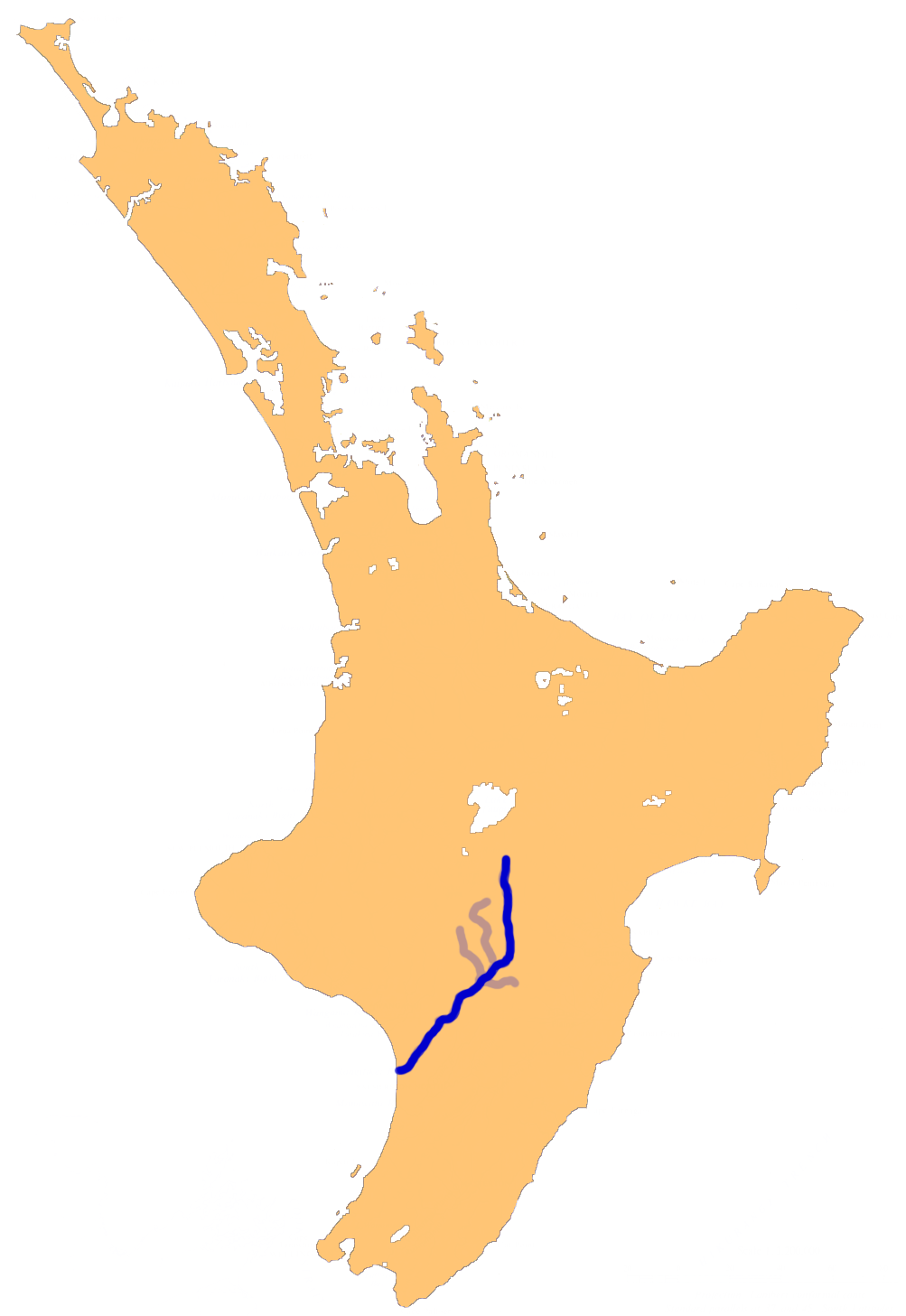
- The Rangitīkei River system
- Native name: Rangitīkei (Māori)

Location
- Country: New Zealand
- Region: Manawatū-Whanganui

Physical characteristics
- Source: Ngapuketurua
  - location: Kaimanawa Ranges
  - coordinates: 39°4′52″S 176°1′52″E
  - elevation: 1,480 metres (4,860 ft)
- Mouth: Tasman Sea
  - location: Tangimoana
  - coordinates: 40°18′2″S 175°13′31″E
  - elevation: Sea level
- Length: 253 kilometres (157 mi)
- Basin size: 3,948 square kilometres (1,524 sq mi)
- Discharge
  - average: 66 m^{3}/s (2,300 cu ft/s)

Basin features
- Tributaries
  - left: Mangamaire River, Whakaurekou River, Kawhatau River, Mangawharariki River
  - right: Moawhango River, Hautapu River

The Rangitīkei River is one of New Zealand's longest rivers at 253 kilometres (157 mi) long.

Its headwaters are to the southeast of Lake Taupō in the Kaimanawa Ranges. It flows from the Volcanic Plateau and Inland Pātea south past Taihape, Mangaweka, Hunterville, Marton, and Bulls, to the South Taranaki Bight at Tangimoana, 40 kilometres (25 mi) southeast of Whanganui. The river gives its name to the surrounding Rangitikei District.

The river is a popular leisure and recreation area for jetboating, white water rafting, kayaking and fishing, and includes public camp grounds along its banks, including Vinegar Hill, New Zealand. Its sheer vertical "paapa" (clay) cliffs (unique to this part of New Zealand) and deep canyons provide the perfect setting for adventure activities such as bungy jumps and flying fox rides. The cliffs, which display oxygen isotope stages, have been incised into the soft Quaternary, 2.6 to 1.7 million year old, marine sediments as the land has risen since the last ice age. The rise has left 19 terraces, which have been mapped.

There are rainbow trout and brown trout throughout the river system, with fish in the upper reaches reaching trophy size (i.e. over 4.5 kg), and the average through the rest of the system being around 1.5 to 2 kg. Fish numbers are good throughout the system. There are fewer fish per kilometre in the upper reaches, but this is made up for by their quality and larger size.

== History ==
In 1897 the river flooded and all the bridges over it (Vinegar Hill, Onepuhi, Kakariki railway bridge and Bulls) were damaged or destroyed. Port of Rangitikei, at the mouth of the river, was washed away and never rebuilt. Other notable floods were in 1882, 1917, 1936, 1958, 1965 and 2004. Until 1908 a ferry linked Tangimoana to Scotts Ferry. Onepuhi, or Onepuehu, bridge was shown on the 1941 map, but missing from the 1968 and later maps. Further decking for the 807 ft (246 m) long Onepuhi bridge was suggested in 1958.

Part of the river was used as the Anduin River in Peter Jackson's movie The Lord of the Rings: The Fellowship of the Ring.

== Bridges ==
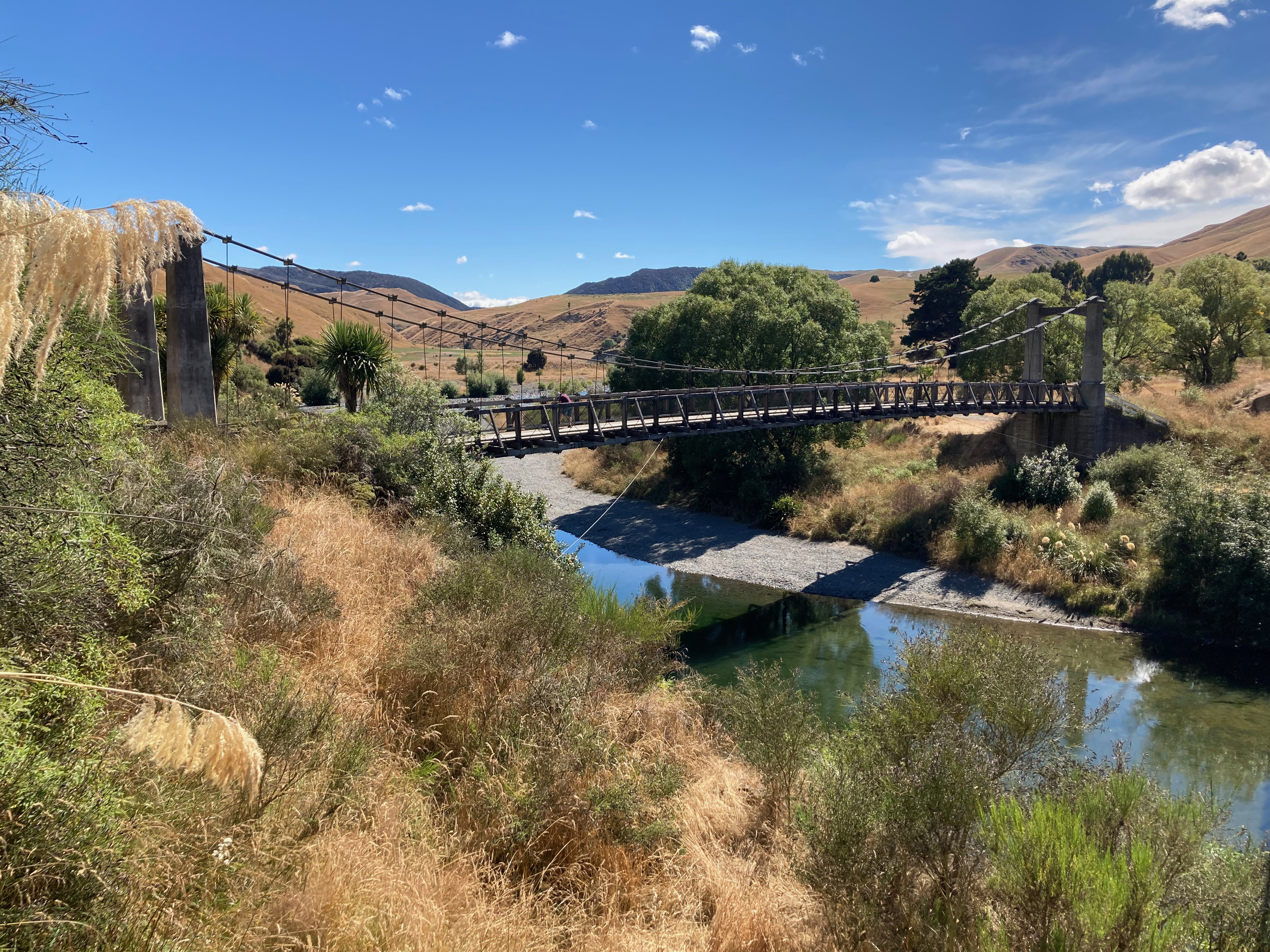
Springvale Suspension Bridge

The Springvale Suspension Bridge crosses the Rangitīkei River on the Taihape–Napier Road (known as the Gentle Annie). It is located on the Ngamatea Plateau in the district of Ngamahanga, 41 km north-east of Taihape and 111 km west of Napier. It was built to support farming, which increased in the Inland Pātea region after World War I, and the need to transport stock and wool to the port at Napier. The bridge was designed by Rangitīkei County engineer Sydney Mair and built by William Salt. Construction commenced in 1923, the bridge opened in 1925 and it was known as the Rangitīkei Bridge or Erewhon Bridge after the name of the farming block. The name Springvale came from the nearby sheep farm.

A new Callender–Hamilton bridge was built nearby in 1970, as the suspension bridge was no longer able to carry heavy trucks. As an early example of a suspension bridge with reinforced concrete towers its importance in engineering heritage was recognised by Heritage New Zealand, who designated it as a Category II historic site and preserved it. The bridge has a span of 61m supported by 7m high concrete towers at either end. The deck is made of wood and at 2.4m wide is a single lane.

The Mangaweka Cantilever Bridge is the only steel cantilever road bridge to be built in New Zealand. It crosses the Rangitikei River, connecting Mangaweka and the Kawhātau Valley. It is registered as a category 2 structure with Heritage New Zealand.

The cantilever design was chosen in the 19th century by the Public Works Department after an earlier design had been destroyed by a flood in 1897. Construction of the bridge was delayed due to focus on the development of the North Island Main Trunk line and the bridge was not completed until 1904. In 2016 the bridge was closed due to concerns it was not structurally sound and it was proposed to demolish it; however, local support for retention of the bridge let to it being retained as a pedestrian bridge, with a replacement road bridge constructed nearby.
