= Russell Packer =

New Zealand & Maori international rugby league player

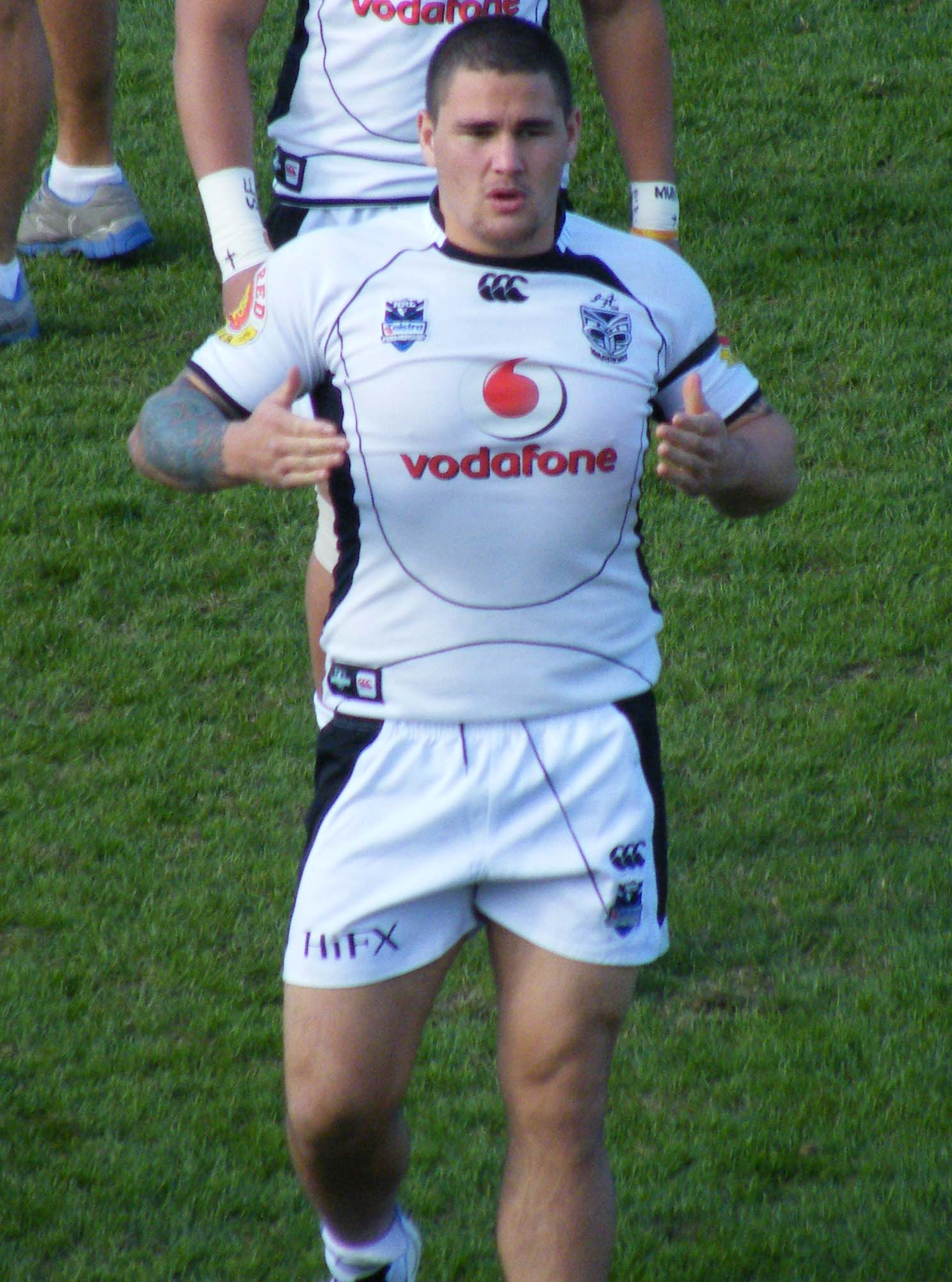

Personal information
- Full name: Russell Packer
- Born: 9 October 1989 (age 37) Foxton, New Zealand
- Height: 187 cm (6 ft 2 in)
- Weight: 119 kg (18 st 10 lb)

Playing information
- Position: Prop
Club
Years	Team	Pld	T	G	FG	P
2008–13	New Zealand Warriors	110	6	0	0	24
2016–17	St. George Illawarra	41	1	0	0	4
2018–21	Wests Tigers	33	1	0	0	4
	Total	184	8	0	0	32
Representative
Years	Team	Pld	T	G	FG	P
2010	New Zealand Māori	1	0	0	0	0
2011–17	New Zealand	7	1	0	0	4
2021	Māori All Stars	1	0	0	0	0
- Source: As of 6 May 2021

Russell Packer (born 9 October 1989) is a New Zealand former professional rugby league footballer who played as a prop for the Wests Tigers, St. George Illawarra Dragons and the New Zealand Warriors in the NRL, and the New Zealand Māori and New Zealand at international level.

== Background ==
Packer was born in Foxton, New Zealand.

Educated at Foxton Beach School and Manawatu College, Packer played rugby union from a young age for the junior Foxton rugby club, as well as for a junior Marist club in Nelson.

Packer also played in the Foxton Rugby League Under 14s side at the age of nine years in a curtain raiser between the Manawatu Mustangs and Auckland Warriors reserve-grade side in 1998.

Packer then played for the Levin Lions. In 2005, Packer was named in the New Zealand under-16 side. When he was only 16, he debuted for the Central Falcons in the Bartercard Cup. He again achieved national selection in 2006 when he was named both the captain of the Junior Kiwis and as a member of the New Zealand 'A' squad. In 2007, he was named in the New Zealand under-18 side.

== Professional playing career ==
=== 2007-2010 ===
In 2007, Packer signed with the New Zealand Warriors but spent most of the season playing for the Auckland Lions in the NSWRL Premier League. He also played for the Central Falcons in the final season of the Bartercard Cup. At the end of 2007 he received an offer from the Sydney Roosters but turned them down, preferring to stay in New Zealand.

He made his NRL debut in Round 10 on 4 May 2008 against the Canberra Raiders. He played in four other NRL games in 2008 and also played twenty games for the Junior Warriors in the new Toyota Cup competition. At the end of the season Packer was named in the National Youth Competition's Team of the Year alongside teammate Ben Matulino. He finished his Toyota Cup career at the end of 2009 with twenty three appearances and five tries.

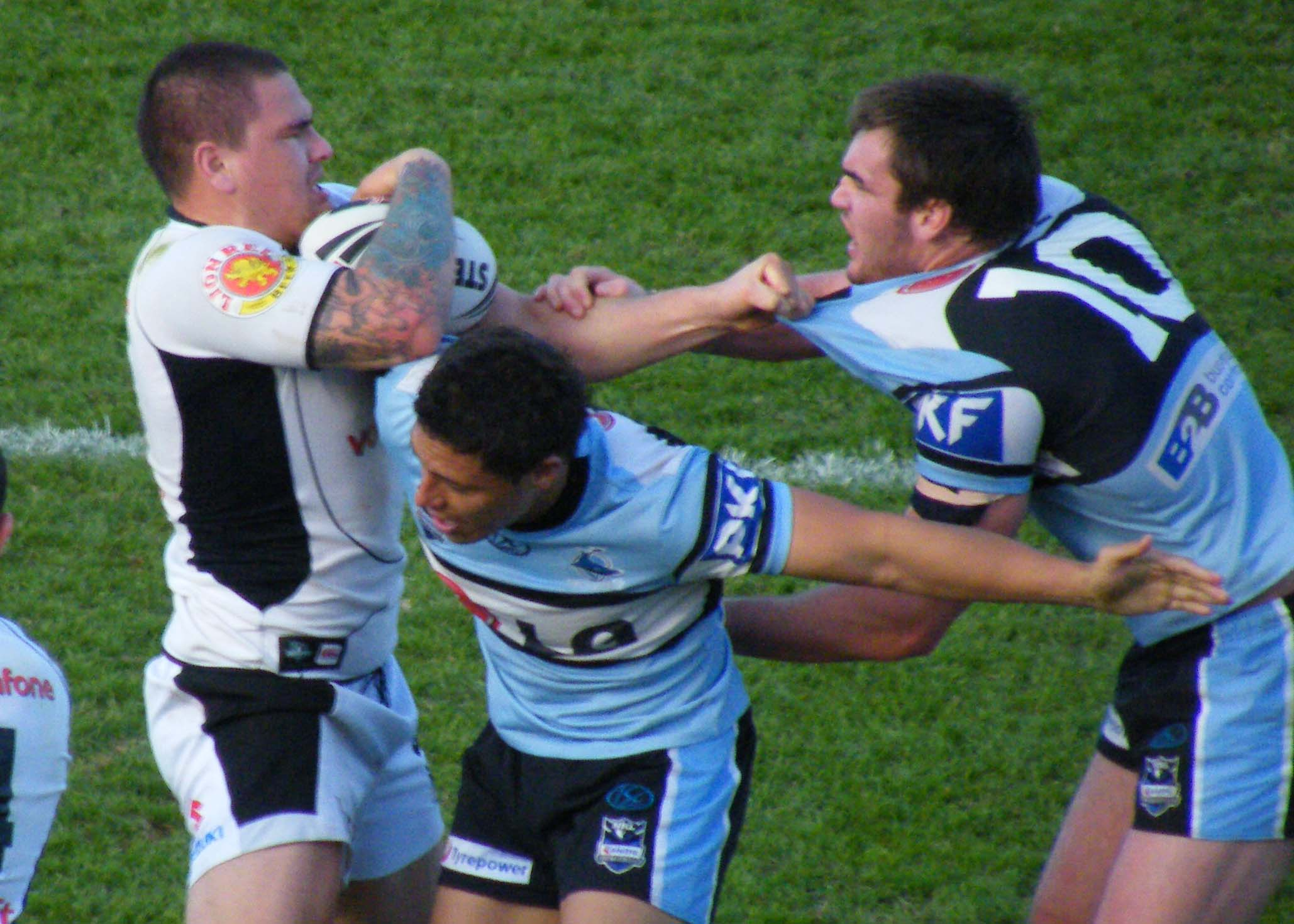
Packer playing for the Warriors in 2009

In 2010, Packer played for the New Zealand Māori against England.

=== 2011-2013 ===
Packer was selected to play for the Warriors in the 2011 NRL Grand final against the Manly-Warringah Sea Eagles as a starting prop forward. In the post-season he was selected to make his debut for the New Zealand national team in the same position in a game against Australia in Newcastle. At the 2011 Four Nations tournament held shortly after, Packer played one match for New Zealand against England.

In June 2013, Packer was caught on camera urinating in his shorts on field prior to kick off. Packer then played out the match for the Warriors against the Brisbane Broncos. The incident, dubbed "completely unacceptable and disgusting" by the NRL, resulted in a $15,000 fine. After the game he tweeted: "Good win when u gotta go u gotta go lol".

On 2 October 2013, Packer signed a 4-year contract with the Newcastle Knights starting in 2014. In January 2014, Packer's contract was terminated before he could play for the Knights due to a serious assault committed by Packer at the end of November 2013 and impending criminal proceedings.

== Assault conviction ==
On 29 November 2013, Packer appeared before court in Sydney, New South Wales, charged with assaulting a 22-year-old man, fracturing his eye socket. Packer punched the man in the face, causing him to fall and hit his head on the ground. Packer then punched the man several times as he lay on the ground and stomped on his head, leaving the victim with two fractured facial bones. On 6 January 2014, Packer was sentenced to two years in jail after pleading guilty to assault occasioning actual bodily harm. Magistrate Greg Grogan labeled Packer's actions as "cowardly and deplorable".

In April 2014 the non-parole period of Packer's two-year sentence was reduced on appeal from two years to one. Having had a criminal conviction, there had been fears that he would be deported back to New Zealand, but on 16 December he was granted permission to remain in Australia, thus clearing the way for him to resume his first grade career with the St. George Illawarra Dragons.

== Return to rugby league ==
=== 2015-2017: St. George Illawarra ===
In May 2015, Packer returned to rugby league with the Dragons' second-tier team, the Illawarra Cutters, in the New South Wales Cup. On 27 September 2015, he was named at prop in the 2015 New South Wales Cup Team of the Year. The Dragons had been assisting Packer's rehabilitation within the rugby league community throughout 2015 and in October of that year, after the NRL gave formal approval for him to play in the NRL once more, he was able to sign a 2-year contract with them, starting in 2016.

Packer played 41 games during his two-year stay at Dragons, scoring 1 try, almost always as starting prop. At the end of 2016, Packer said, "I would love to represent my country again. I have done it a couple of times back in 2011 but I was pretty young then and I took a lot of the experiences for granted. I think at that stage of my life I didn’t appreciate the time that I had. I would love to get another opportunity just to be around that environment." Packer made his return to international football in the 2017 Anzac Test, and played in every game for New Zealand in 2017 Rugby League World Cup.

=== 2018 onward: Wests Tigers ===
==== 2018 ====
Reuniting with Ivan Cleary, who had coached Packer at the Warriors, he was one of Wests Tigers major signings for 2018. Cleary said, "I've known Russell for a long time and he has leadership qualities as well. He's not shy about coming forward and having an opinion. He's passionate about what he does."

After the departure of Aaron Woods, Packer was named as one of 5 co-captains at Wests Tigers, alongside Benji Marshall, Chris Lawrence, Elijah Taylor and Josh Reynolds. Coach Ivan Cleary said, "I just think it's the right model for us right now. When we started this preseason it was pretty obvious straight away that there was no real pecking order. There was no set culture to adhere to. It was all new." With the role rotating, Packer was the on-field captain for the first time in round 2.

==== 2019 ====
At the start of the 2019 NRL season, Packer remained as one of the club's first choice props and featured in the first six games of the season. After Wests 51–6 loss against Parramatta at the new Western Sydney Stadium, Packer was demoted to reserve grade by coach Michael Maguire and played no further games in first grade.

==== 2020 ====
In February 2020, it was revealed that Packer could be forced to medically retire from rugby league after struggling to recover from an ongoing foot injury.

In round 5 of the 2020 NRL season, Packer played his first game in the top grade since April 2019 as Wests played against the Canberra Raiders. During the game, Packer was sin binned for a professional foul and later placed on report for a high tackle where he was subsequently suspended for two games.

In round 10, Packer returned to first grade, running for 150 metres as Wests Tigers beat the Brisbane Broncos 48–0. Maguire said, "Since I've been at the club, the poor bloke hasn't been able to train and there's been contention about how I'm going with him. Fortunately with my medical staff they were able to find something in his foot they were able to fix and now all of a sudden he's training. It was an outstanding performance for a bloke that hasn't started throughout the season."

On 6 September, it was reported that Packer and teammate Josh Reynolds had left the club's round 17 match against Manly-Warringah at half-time, which was against team protocols.

Wests Tigers CEO Justin Pascoe released a statement saying "The actions are not acceptable from my perspective. We are focused on ensuring every single person, player coach administrator board members actions are in complete alignment with the expectation of higher standards".

=== 2021 ===
On 2 September, Packer announced his retirement from rugby league following the conclusion of the 2021 NRL season.

== Children ==
Russell Packer has 2 children: Marley Packer and Madison Packer.
