= Oranjehof =

Dutch culture museum in New Zealand

Coordinates: 40°28′26.54″S 175°16′52.59″E

Oranjehof Dutch Connection Centre
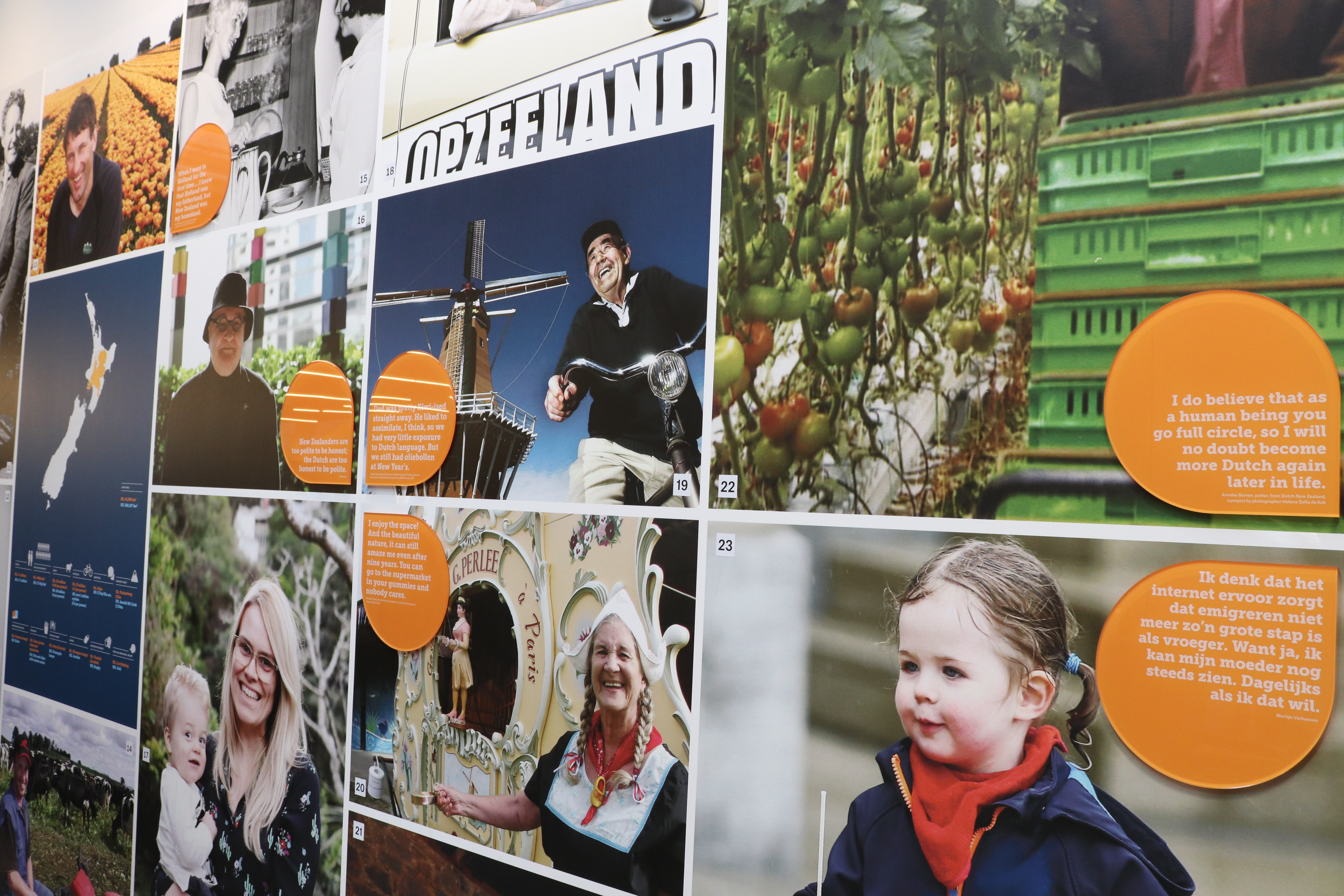
- Location: 92 Main Street, Foxton, New Zealand
- Website: oranjehof.org.nz

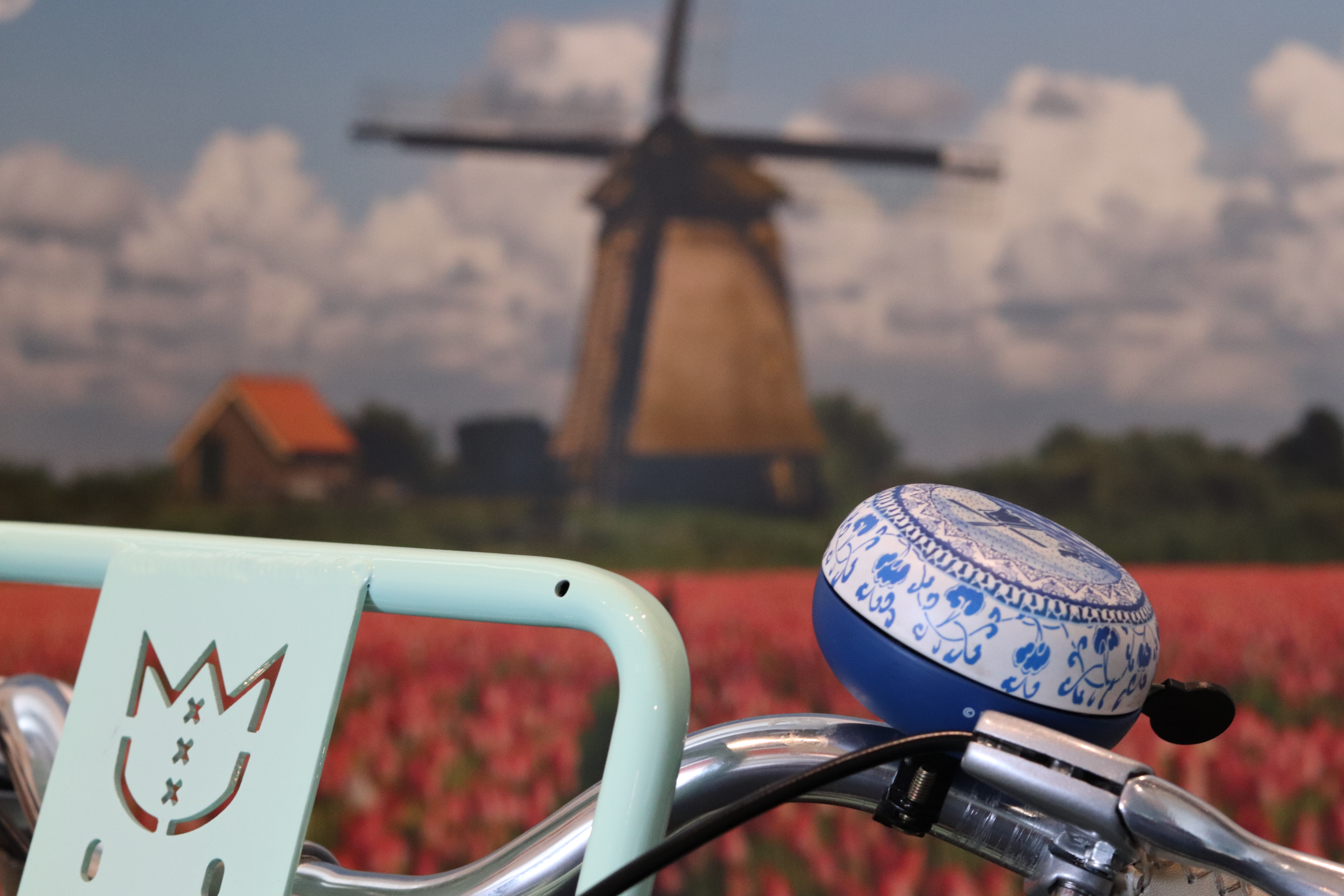
Bicycle - Met Delfts Blauwe Fietsbel

Oranjehof or Oranjehof Dutch Connection Centre is one of the two museums that are part of the multi-cultural, multi-purpose visitor and community hub Te Awahou Nieuwe Stroom in Foxton, New Zealand, just over an hour's drive north of Wellington.

The award-winning facility is also the home of the Piriharakeke Generation Inspiration Centre, a library, community rooms, a gallery, a heritage room, a Council Service Centre and an i-SITE desk.

The Oranjehof museum was created with wide support from the Dutch community in New Zealand. The museum is a centre for Dutch culture, language, community, and depicts the story of the Dutch in New Zealand. It is an integral part of the Te Awahou Riverside Cultural Park, which also features two Dutch-inspired cafes, and a flour-grinding windmill, De Molen.

The Dutch Connection Museum Trust collaborated in partnership with Horowhenua District Council, and the Te Taitoa Māori o Te Awahou Trust to create the Te Awahou Nieuwe Stroom facility - the home of the Oranjehof Dutch Connection Centre.

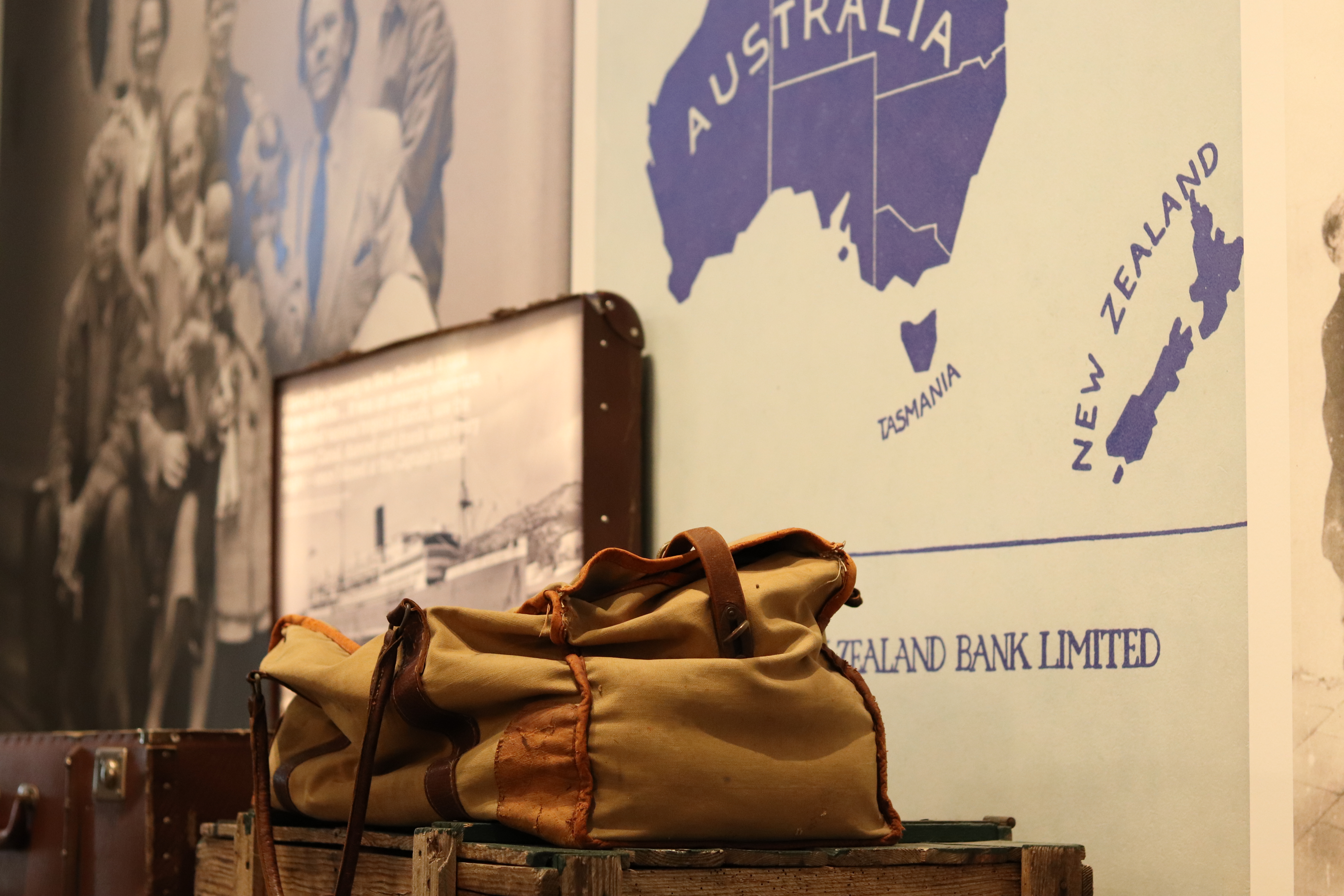
Gepakt en gezakt - Dutch immigrant stories

== Oranjehof Museum ==
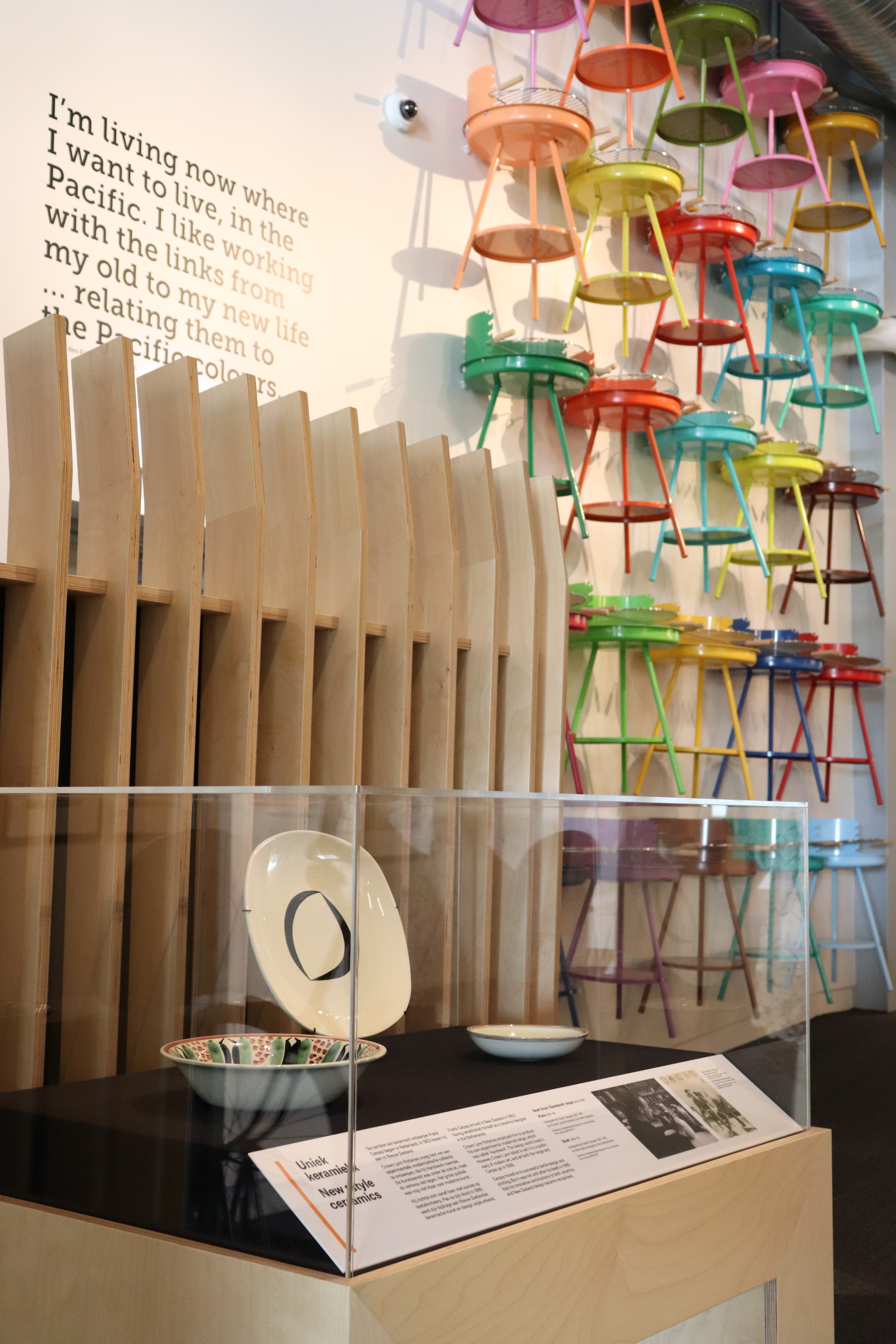
Kunst - Art and design

Oranjehof is designed in a gezelligheid Dutch style. Dutch artists represented include photographer Ans Westra, sculptor Leon van den Eijkel, and ceramicists Anneke Borren and Melis van der Sluis. Designers include fashion icon Doris de Pont and Carpay who did innovative work for Crown Lynn and also had a major impact on textile and graphic design.

== Exhibition and collection ==
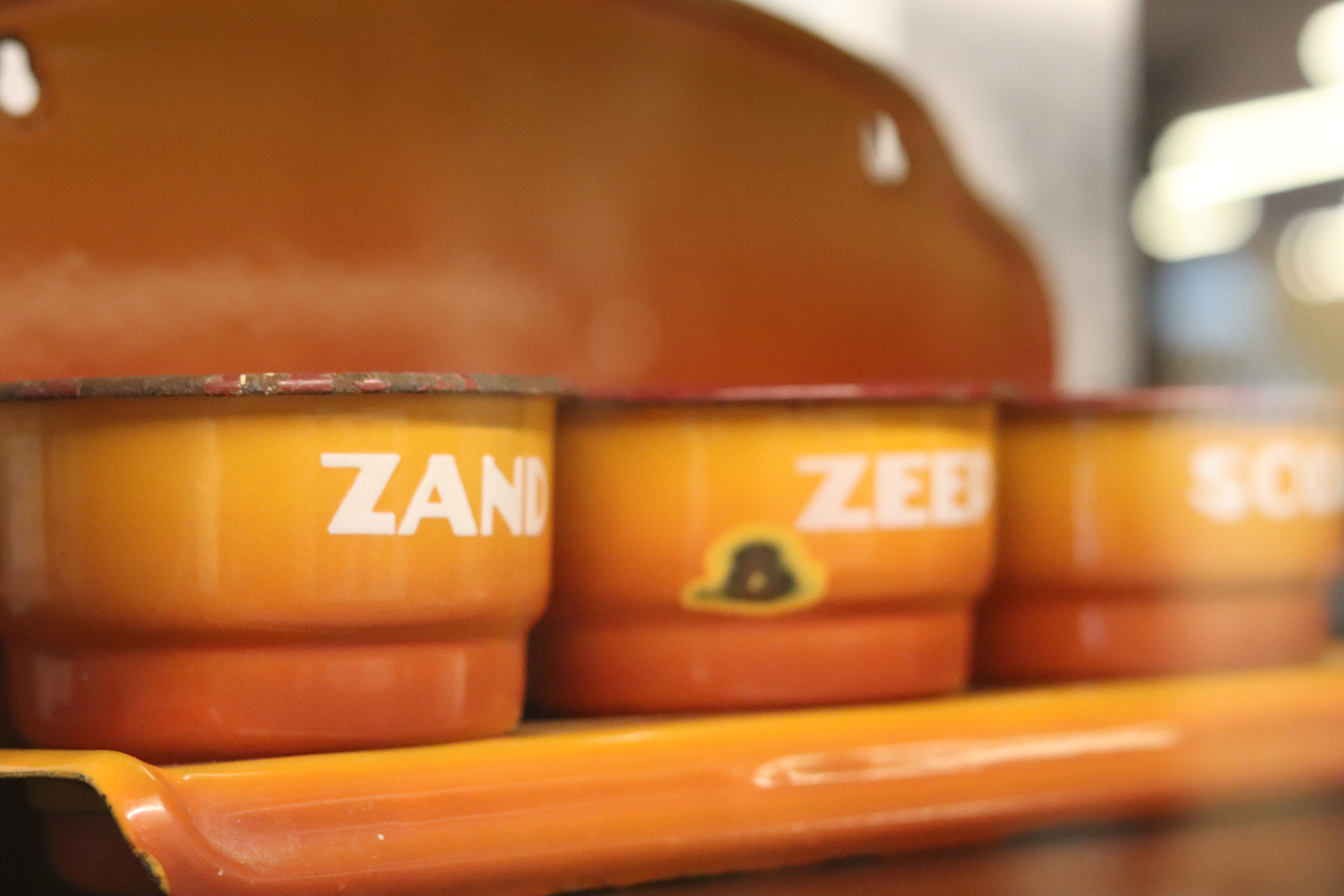
Keukenspul - Dutch kitchen

The history exhibited acknowledges how the Dutch have influenced New Zealand even in the country's name, due to the arrival of Abel Tasman in 1642 (127 years before Captain Cook) and the first European encounter with the Maori. The Dutch – and their children and grandchildren – helped change New Zealand to become a more diverse, multi-cultural nation since the 1950s and 1960s. It became the norm to ignore the culture of origin, and speak English at home. As a result, the Dutch became the ‘Invisible Immigrants’, as they integrated into mainstream society.

Oranjehof preserves this Dutch heritage – history, treasures, art, language, identity, culture, Nederlandse dingen.

As the Dutch Connection Centre, it is the centrepoint for the Dutch community in New Zealand. At least one in every 40 or so New Zealanders has some Dutch heritage or connections.

Oranjehof tells those eye-opening stories in interactive ways through digital displays.

Oranjehof showcases:

- Tasman's travels – The first meeting of two worlds, Māori and Pākehā
- The story of why so many Nederlanders ventured to Aotearoa
- The Dutch influence on art and design.
- The origins of foods such as Vogel's bread, Verkerks salami, as well as coffee culture, artisan cheese making (Gouda and Edam), agriculture and dairy
- Nederlandse Taal – You can listen to Dutch language on Dutch radio
- Traditional games - Plus dress up costumes for selfies

== De Molen Windmill ==
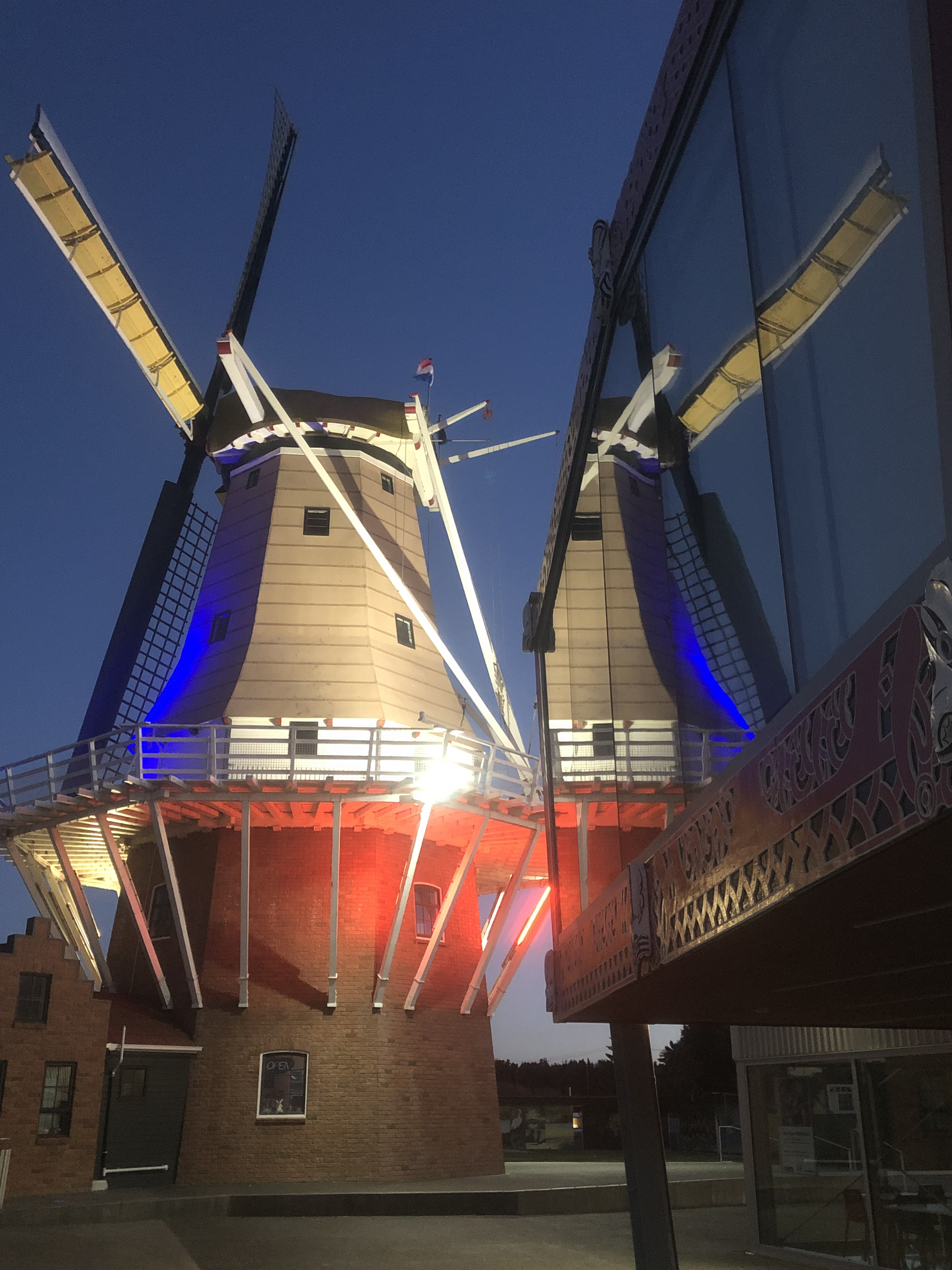
De Molen and Te Awahou front

The full size replica of a Dutch windmill, De Molen, was completed and opened in 2003. It is the result of Netherlands-New Zealand collaboration. Running gear, millstones and sails were produced and installed by Vaags Molenwerken in Aalten, the Netherlands. The mill was built largely by volunteers, under the direction of local builder Cor Slobbe. The 17th century design with wooden beams is impressive, especially when the mill is creaking loudly and the parts are moving, as it grinds flour on windy days. It underwent major repairs in 2018.

The fully working Stellingmolen windmill produces stone-ground flour, which can be purchased inside the mill's Dutch Deli. Visitors can climb up three floors, to witness the wooden mechanical workings of the mill in action - examples of traditional Dutch 17th century engineering. The miller sets the blades in motion on windy days, and is available for tours to explain the history of milling, or for a more casual conversation.

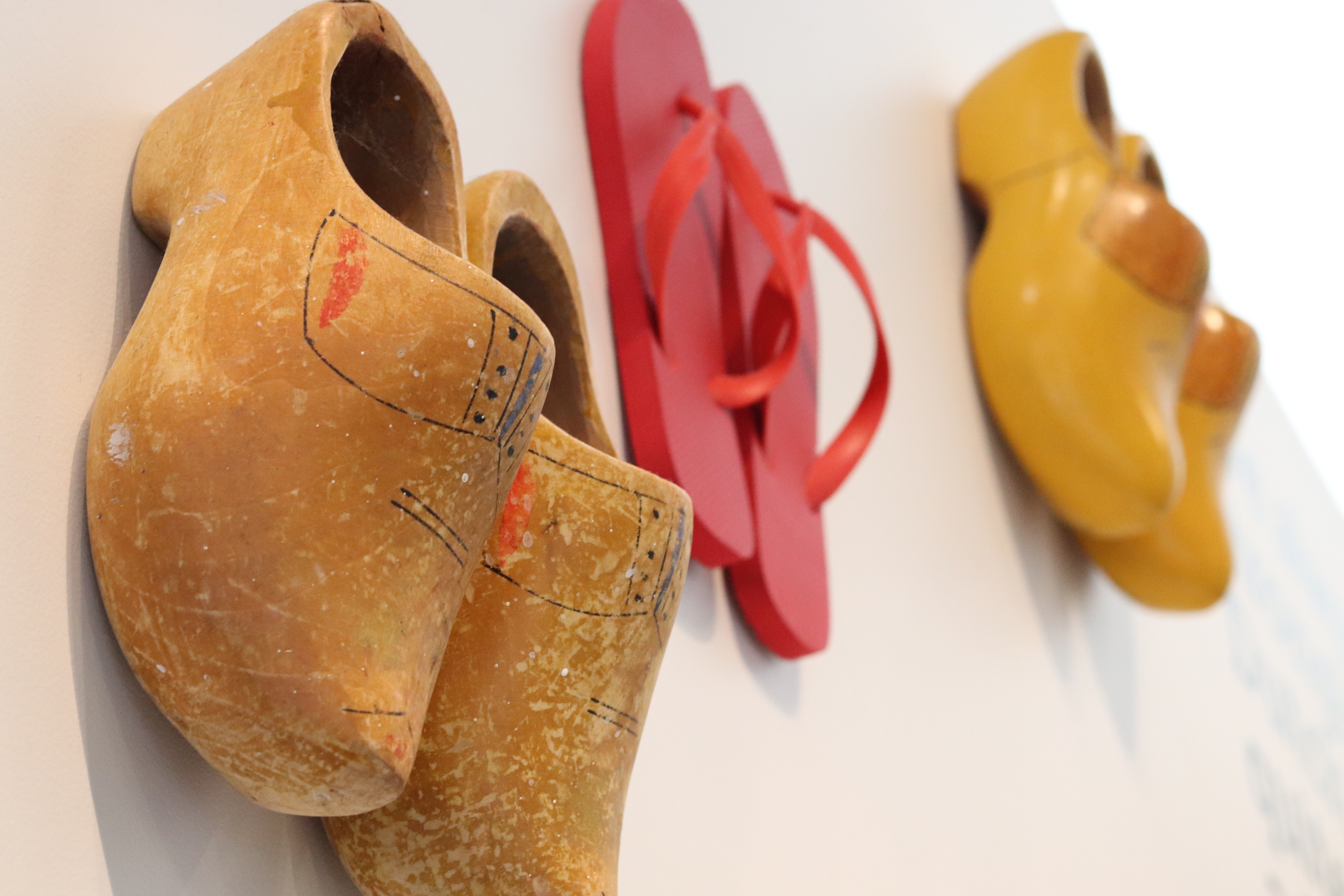
Nederlanders - A foot in both worlds: Oranjehof Museum
