= Te Awahou Nieuwe Stroom =

Community hub in Foxton, New Zealand

Coordinates: 40°28′26″S 175°16′50″E

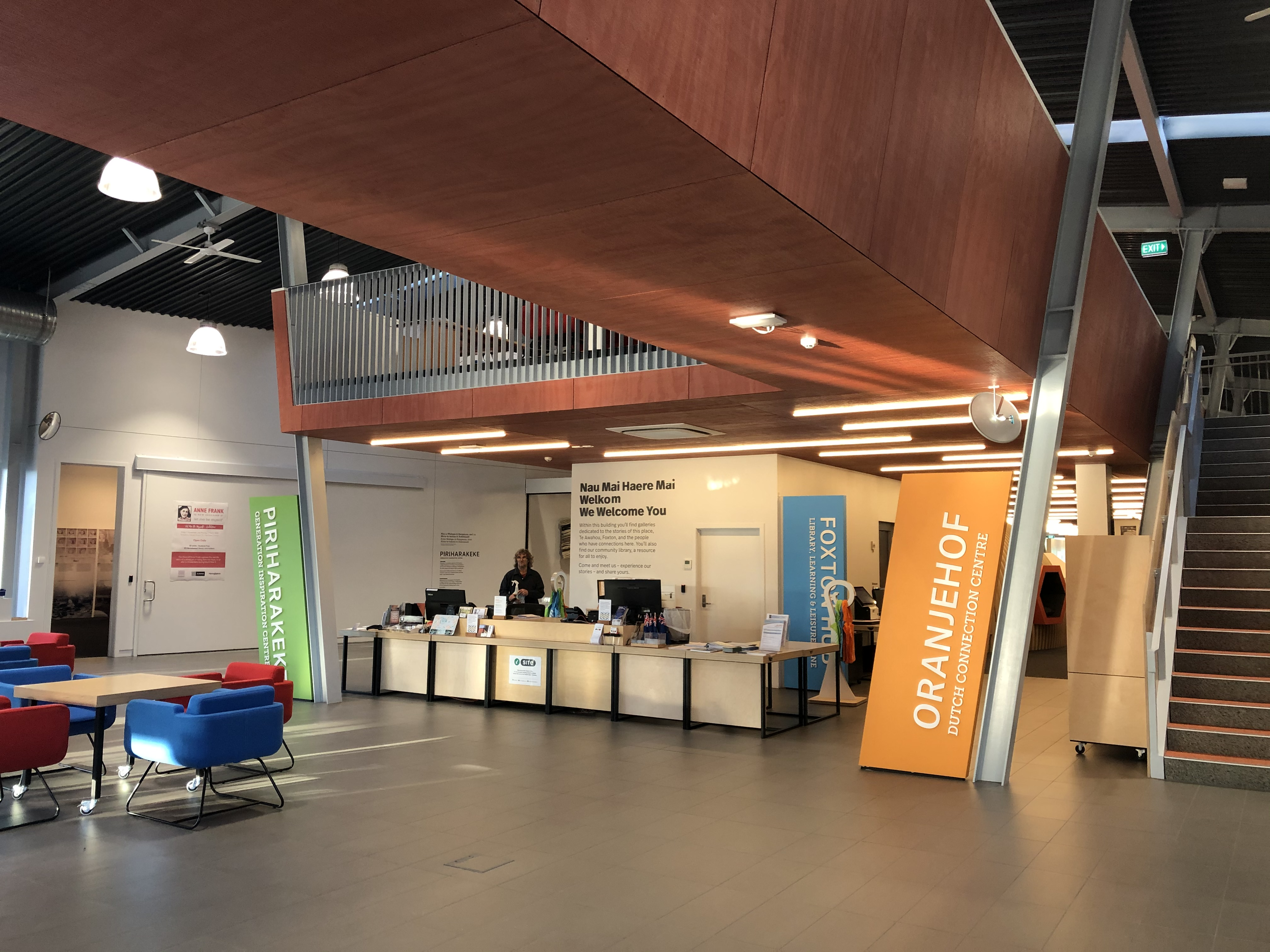
- Location: 92 Main Street, Foxton, New Zealand
- Visitors: 150,000 (2018)
- Website: www.teawahou.com

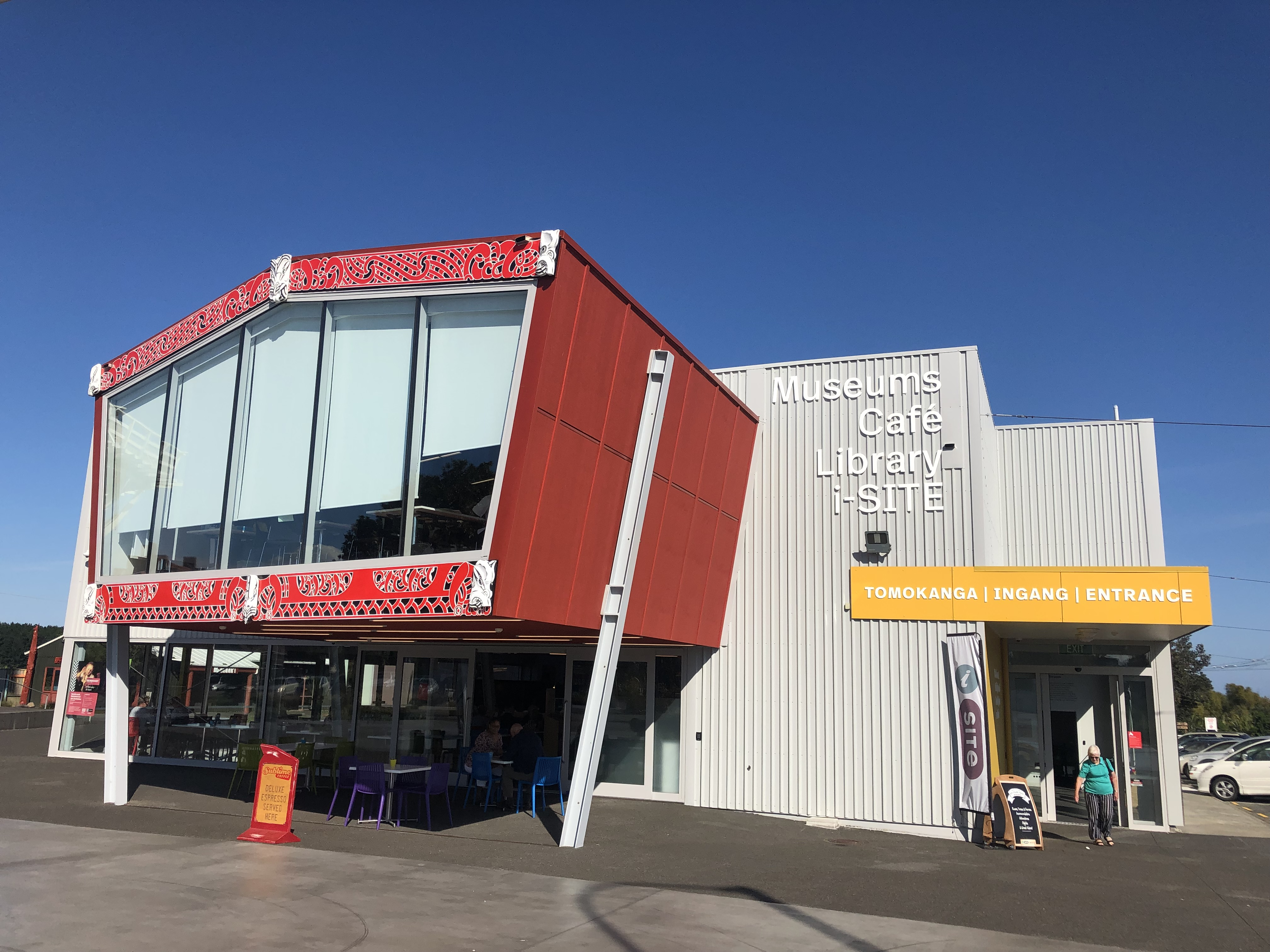

Te Awahou Nieuwe Stroom is a multi-cultural, multi-purpose visitor and community hub in Foxton, in the southern part of New Zealand's North Island. The facility hosts some 150,000 users annually - to visit the Māori and Dutch museums, the library or the community rooms, the gallery or the heritage room. Locals take care of their affairs in the Council Service Centre.

Te Awahou Nieuwe Stroom was created through a partnership between Horowhenua District Council, Te Taitoa Māori o Te Awahou Trust and the Dutch Connection Museum Trust. Its signage features three languages, and its objective is to act as a centre for cultural wellbeing for the local community, mana whenua (Ngāti Raukawa ki te Tonga) and Dutch immigrants alike.

The Piriharakeke museum illustrates the history, reo and taonga of Ngāti Raukawa ki te Tonga. The Oranjehof museum tells the story of the 'Invisible Immigrants' - the Dutch community in Aotearoa.

The facility is located in Te Awahou Riverside Cultural Park, along with two cafes, a museum and other attractions.

== Te Awahou Nieuwe Stroom ==
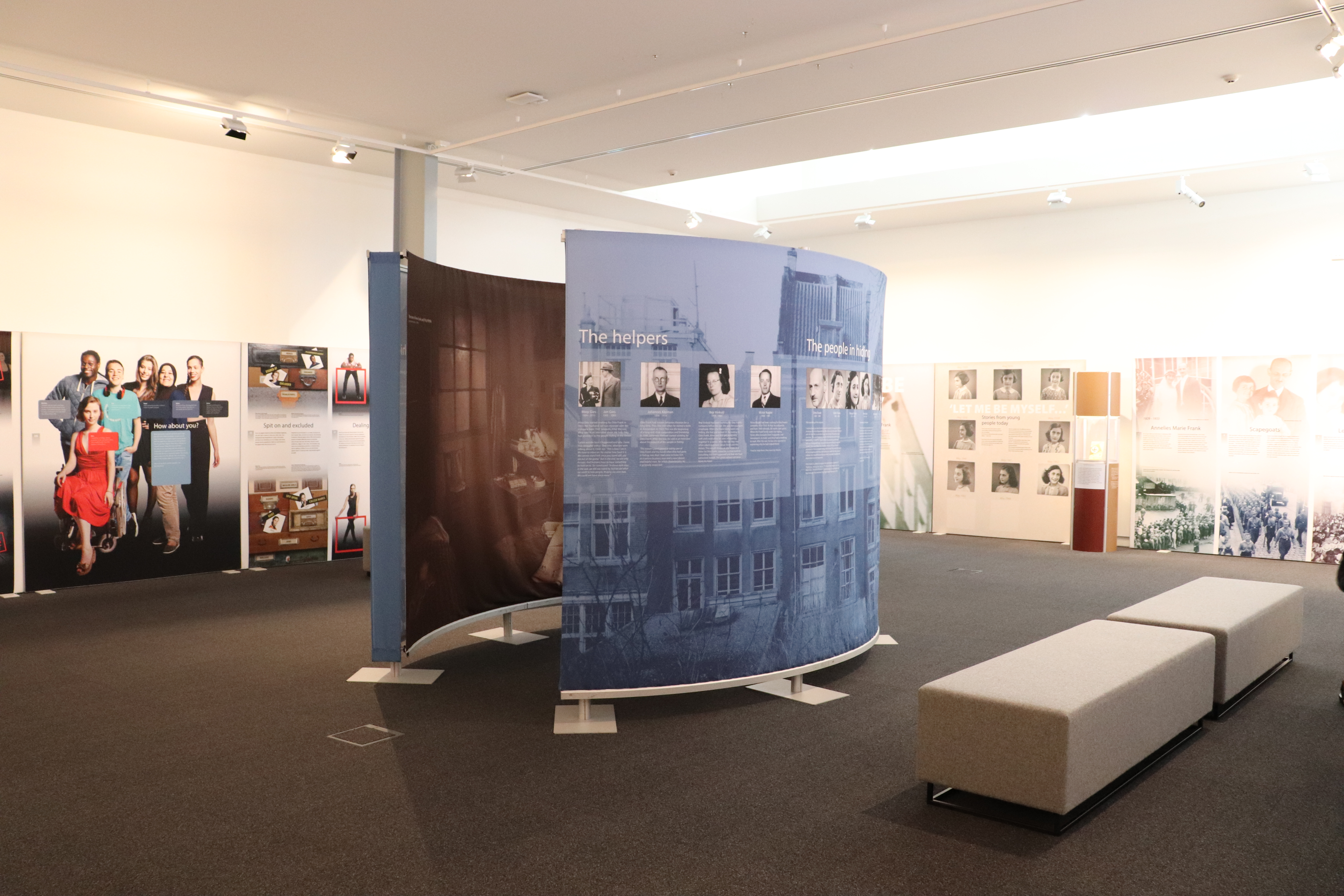

Te Awahou Nieuwe Stroom first opened its doors to the public on 18 November 2017. The opening day was attended by Kaumatua, Ministers of the Crown and the Dutch Ambassador.

=== A community and visitor hub ===
The concept of a multi-cultural and multi-lingual community and visitor centre attracted funding of more than $1 million from the Ministry of Arts, Culture and Heritage.

Since 2018, the facility has won a number of architecture and cultural awards, including a Project Excellence Award Museums Aotearoa Award judges considered Te Awahou Nieuwe Stroom: “a ground-breaking three-way cultural partnership. The result is a feeling of real community ownership for the centre.”

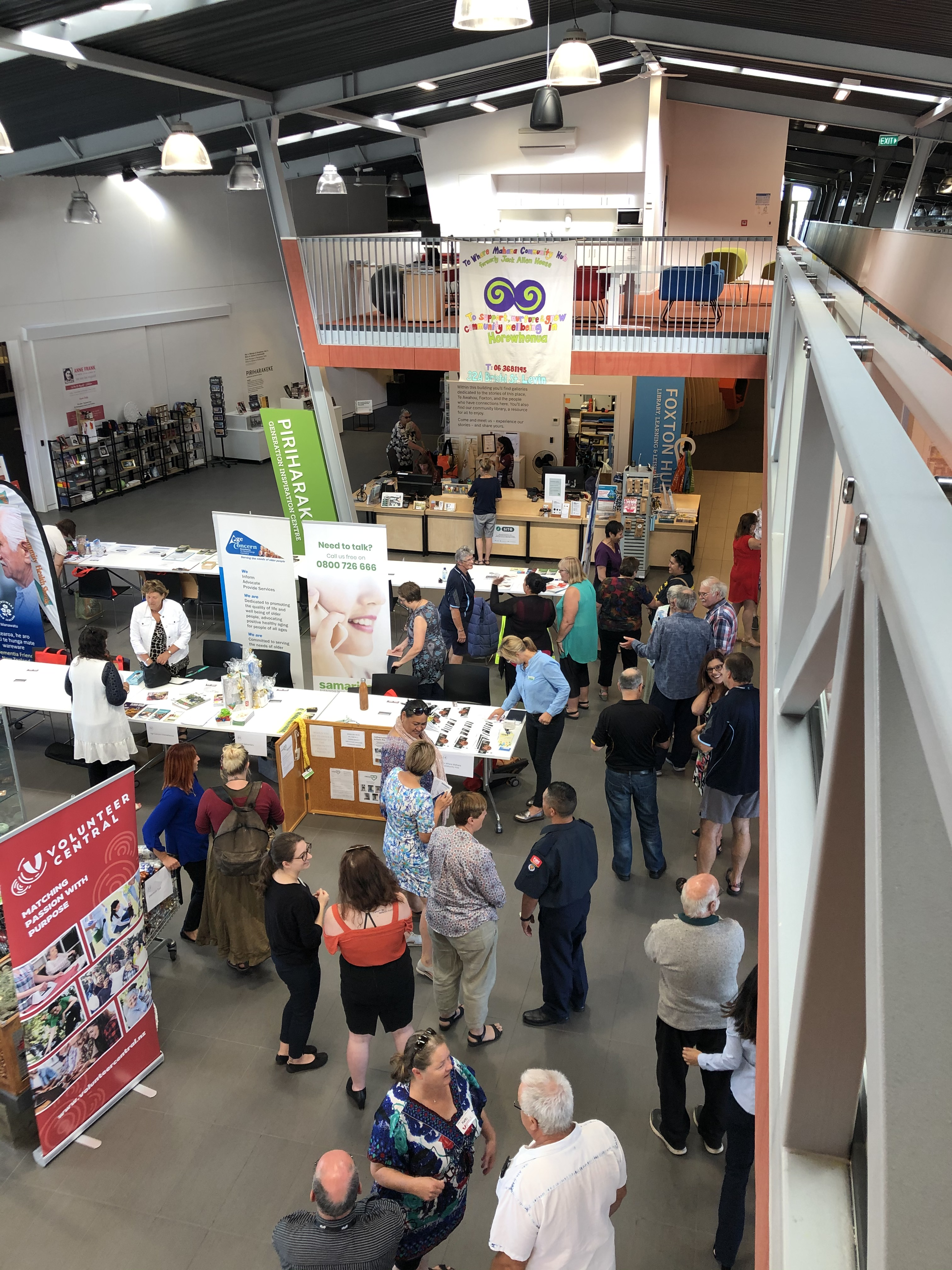

The facility includes two museums, a gallery, a heritage room, library, cafe and i-SITE, plus a Council service centre. Some 150,000 locals, visitors from out of town and international tourists frequent the building every year. The community areas include a foyer that regularly hosts art classes and senior-net IT help sessions, a large reading area with armchairs and power outlets, and a children's play area with educational toys. Room hire is available for educational purposes, exercise classes, hui, and conventions and business meetings.

=== A multi-cultural facility ===
Te Awahou Nieuwe Stroom was created through a collaboration between three Partners: local iwi, Horowhenua District Council and Dutch immigrant groups.

The Hon Maggie Barry, Minister of Arts, Culture and Heritage, commented: "As keepers and kaitiaki of our stories and our precious taonga, the local museums and galleries and whare taonga play an incredibly important role in our sense of identity as New Zealanders in a multi-cultural sense, ... [this is a] world-class facility".

The Shared Gallery has featured exhibitions from Māori artists and weavers, the 'Nga Hau Ngakau' Māori art exhibition with paintings and taonga puoro, Dutch exhibitions featuring Abel Tasman, Anne Frank and Rembrandt, as well as more local ones.

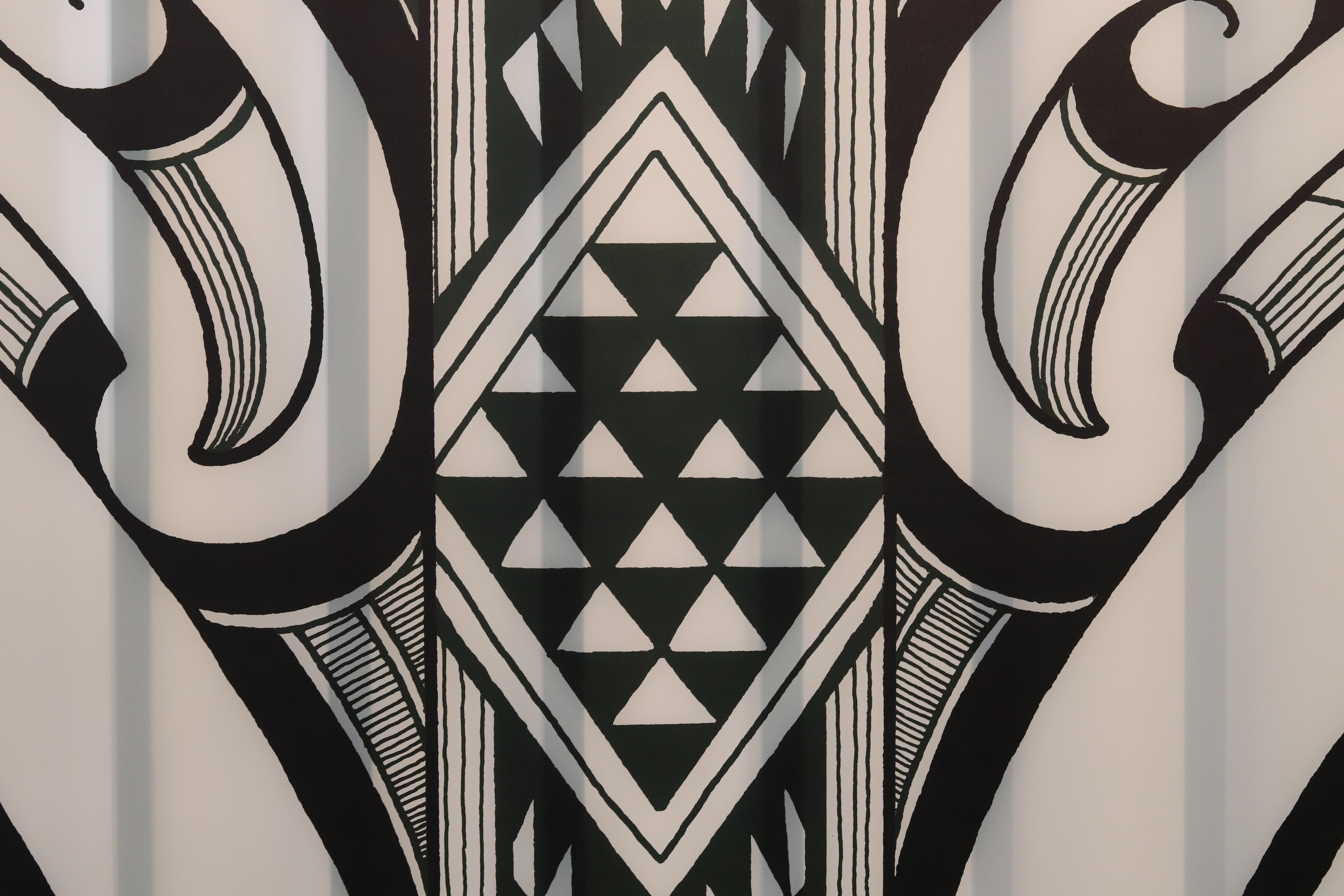
Piriharakeke design

== Museums ==
The Piriharakeke Inspiration Generation Centre features:

- Whakapapa – Origin stories associated with Ngāti Raukawa ki te Tonga
- Whenua – A digitised perspective of landmarks and people, through the Ngāti Raukawa ki te Tonga rohe
- Ko Manawatū te awa – The relationship with the river
- Kaumātua – Our iwi leaders
- Taonga – Special and important, shared with visitors

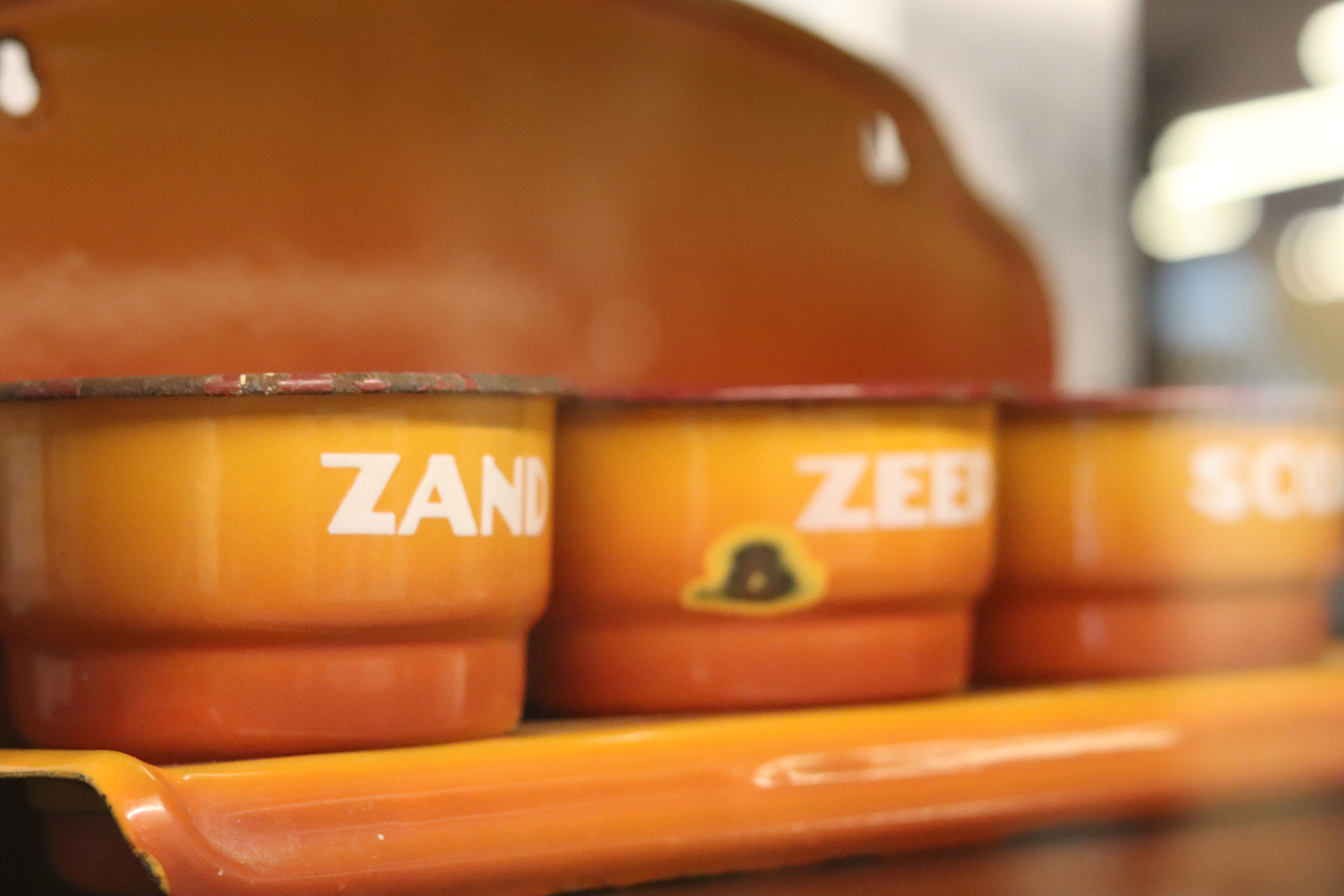
Keukenspul - Dutch kitchen

The Oranjehof Dutch Connection Centre showcases:

- Tasman's travels – The first meeting of two worlds, Māori and Pākehā
- Nederlandse Taal – You can listen to Dutch language on Dutch radio
- Traditional games - Plus dress up costumes for selfies
- The story of why so many Nederlanders ventured to Aotearoa
- The Dutch influence on art and design - And on coffee culture, cheese making, agriculture and dairy

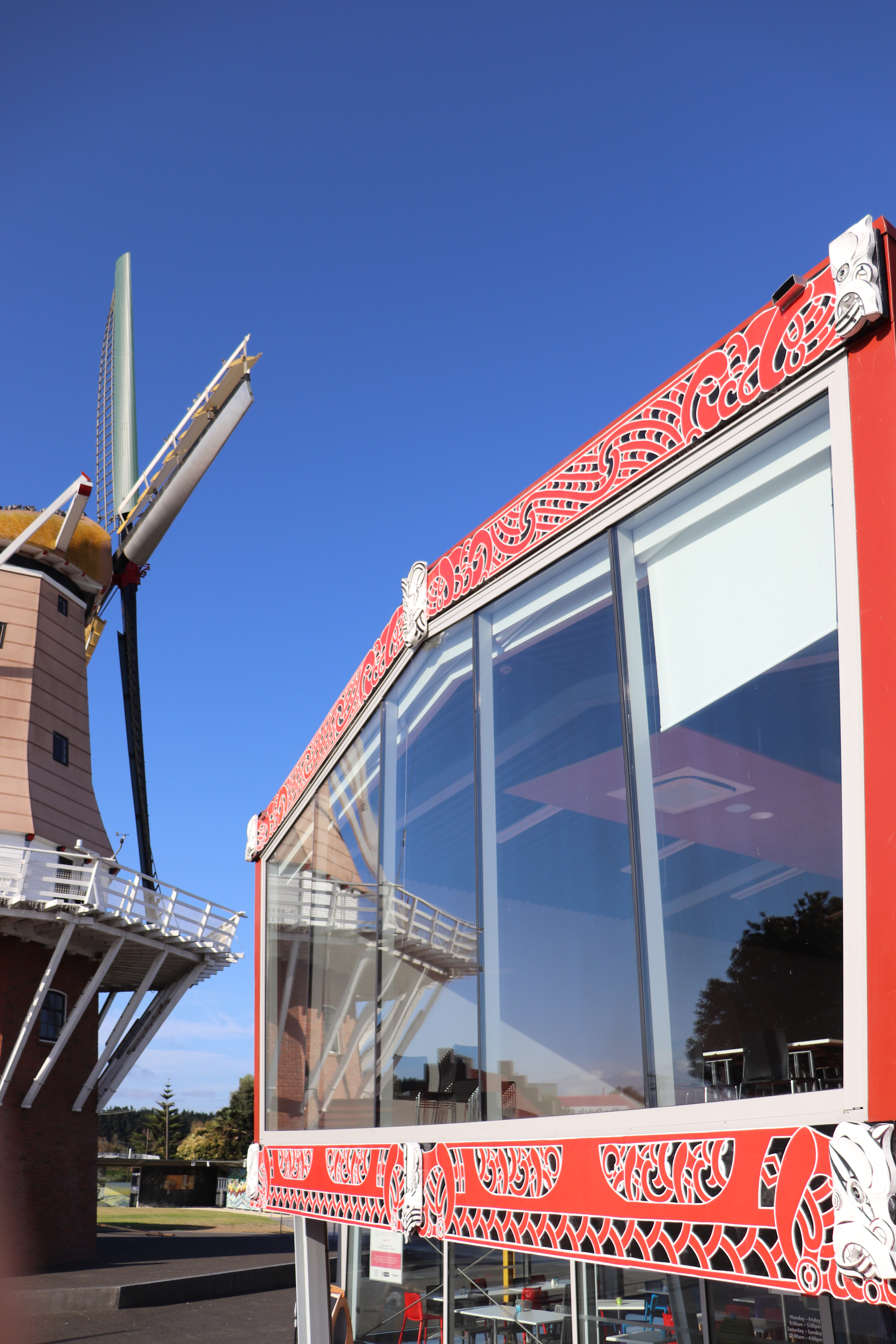
Dutch and Māori - Together

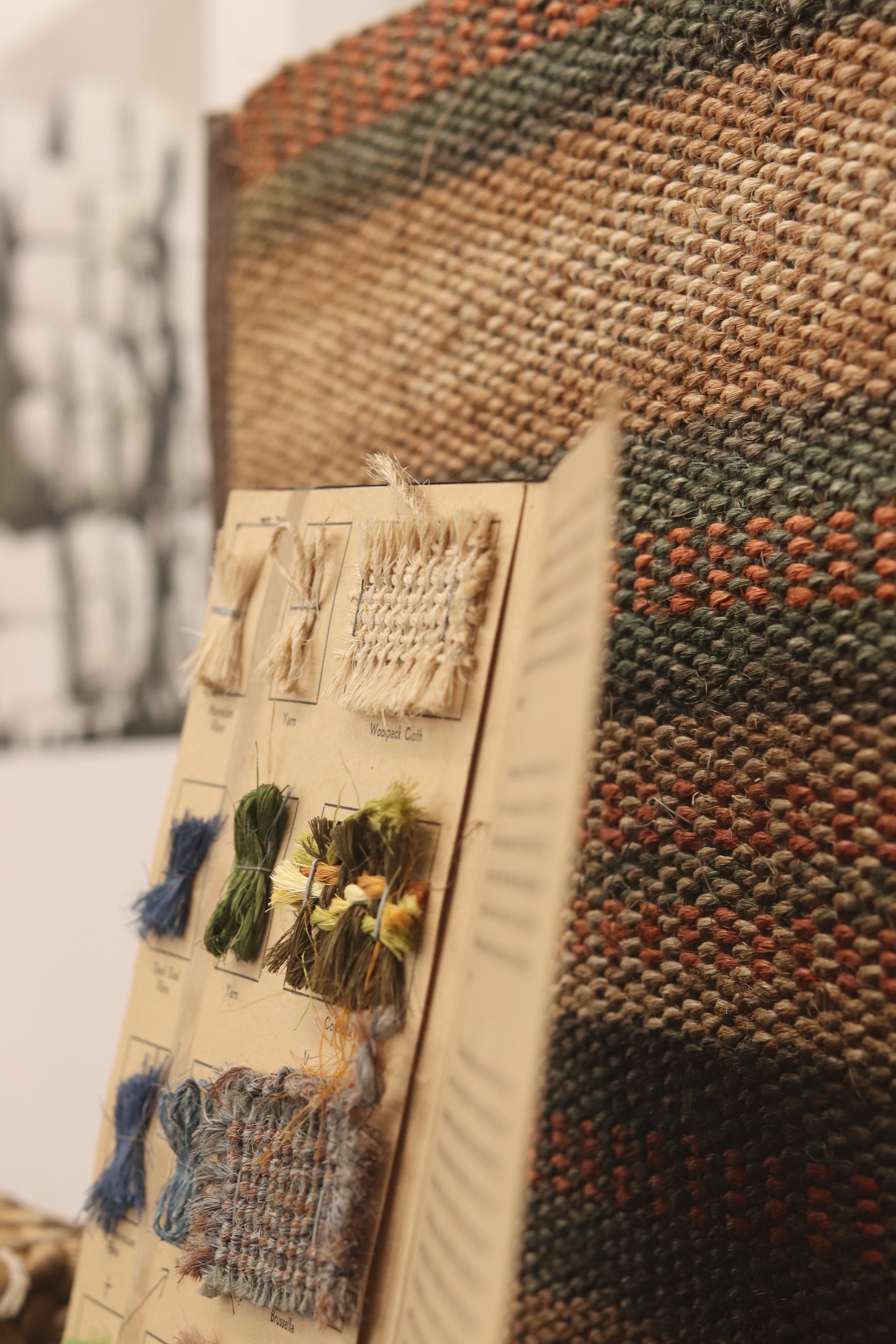
