= Foxton Courthouse =

Historic building in Foxton, New Zealand

Coordinates: 40°28′15″S 175°16′54″E

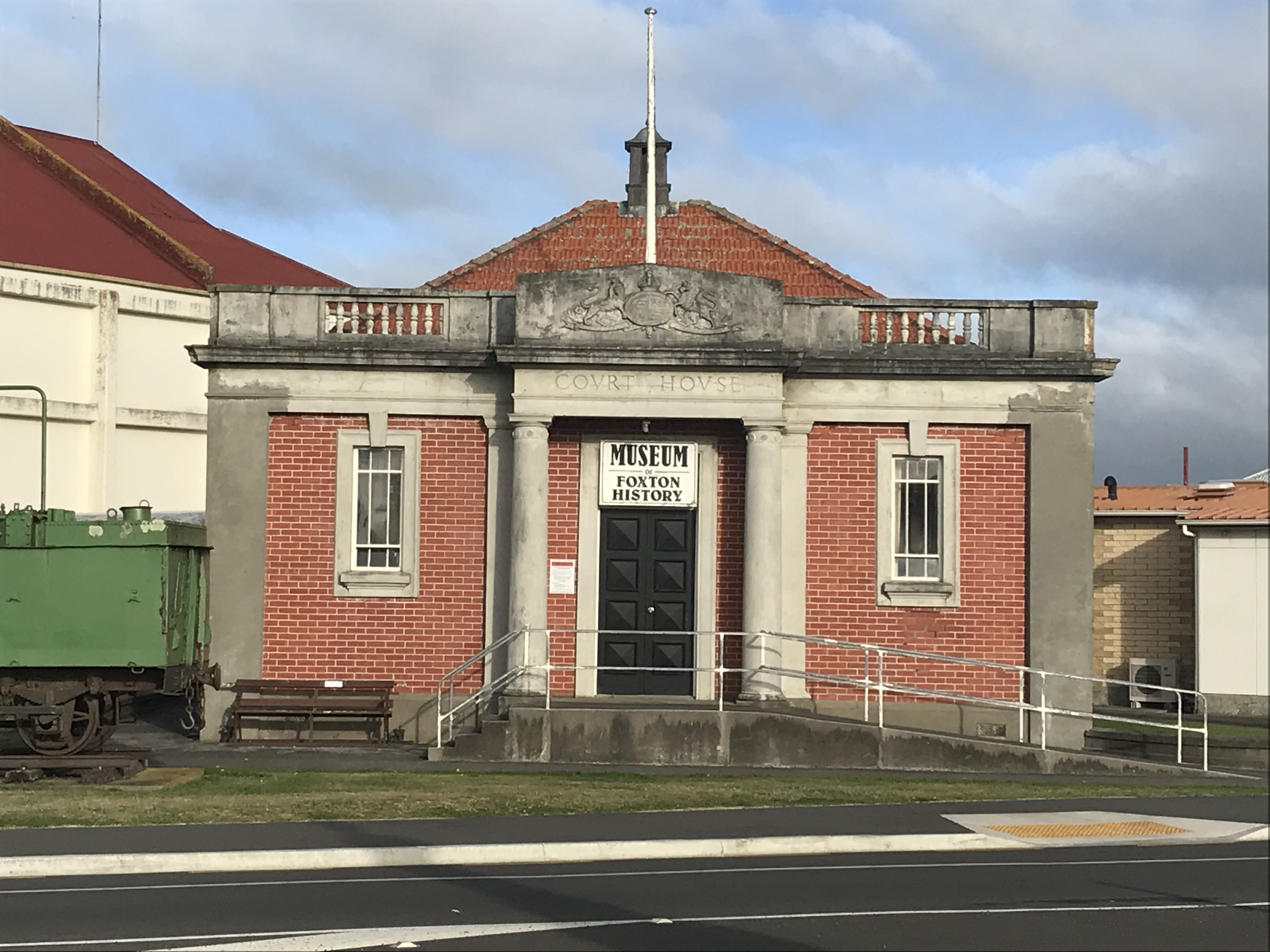
Foxton Courthouse in 2020

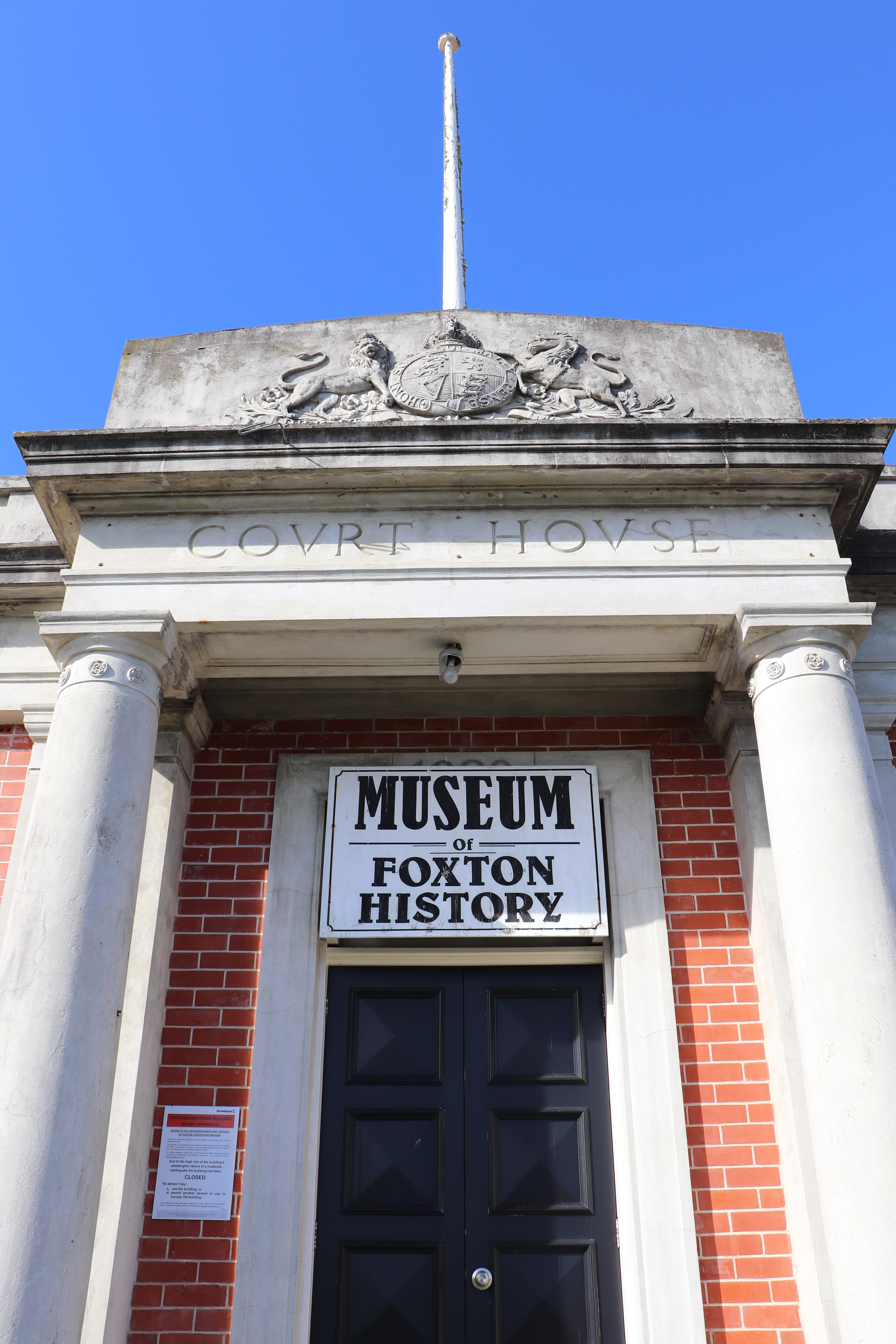
Foxton Court House, located in Avenue Road, Foxton

The Foxton Courthouse is a historic building in the township of Foxton, New Zealand.

== Use as a courthouse ==
The brick building was constructed in 1929. The previous wooden building, constructed in 1867, was described as a "the eyesore of the main street", prompting calls for its replacement. The building work was undertaken by Mr T. W. Hunt of Foxton.

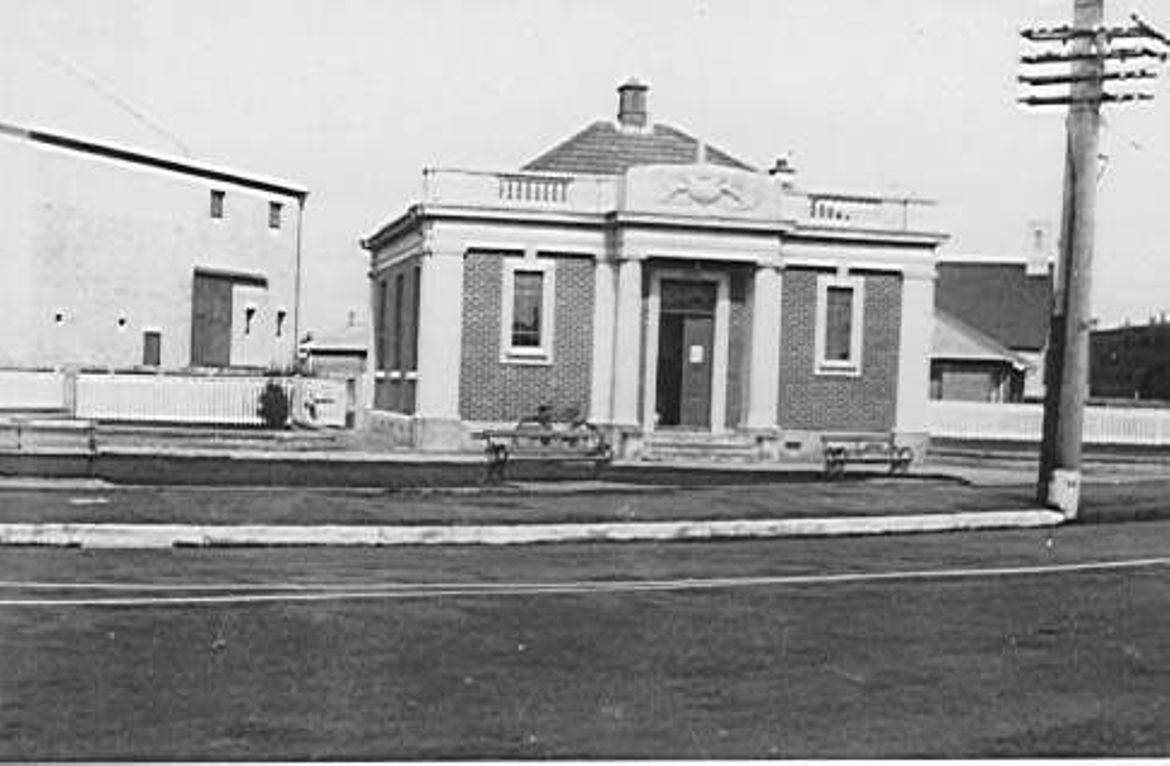
Foxton Museum in the 1970s

Historian Tony Hunt recorded in his history of Foxton that until 1948 the court heard civil and criminal cases, and after this date civil cases were heard elsewhere. The courthouse closed in 1971.

=== Notable cases ===
The courthouse was the location of the coroner's inquest into the Foxton Tragedy (also known as the Himatangi Tragedy) which occurred in 1929 shortly after the new building opened.

== Foxton Museum and Foxton Historical Society ==
The courthouse became the home of the Foxton Historical Society's museum collection. In 2013 the building was closed by the Horowhenua District Council as it was deemed an earthquake risk. The Foxton Historical Society has signaled its intention to fundraise to undertake the required earthquake strengthening and reopen the building as a museum. In February 2020 it was reported that the society was continuing to work on a business case for the development.
