= Foxton Fizz =

New Zealand soft drink

- Founded: 1913
- Headquarters: Foxton, New Zealand
- Country of origin: New Zealand
- Industry: Manufacturing, retail
- Products: Soft Drinks
- Website: https://www.foxtonfizz.com/

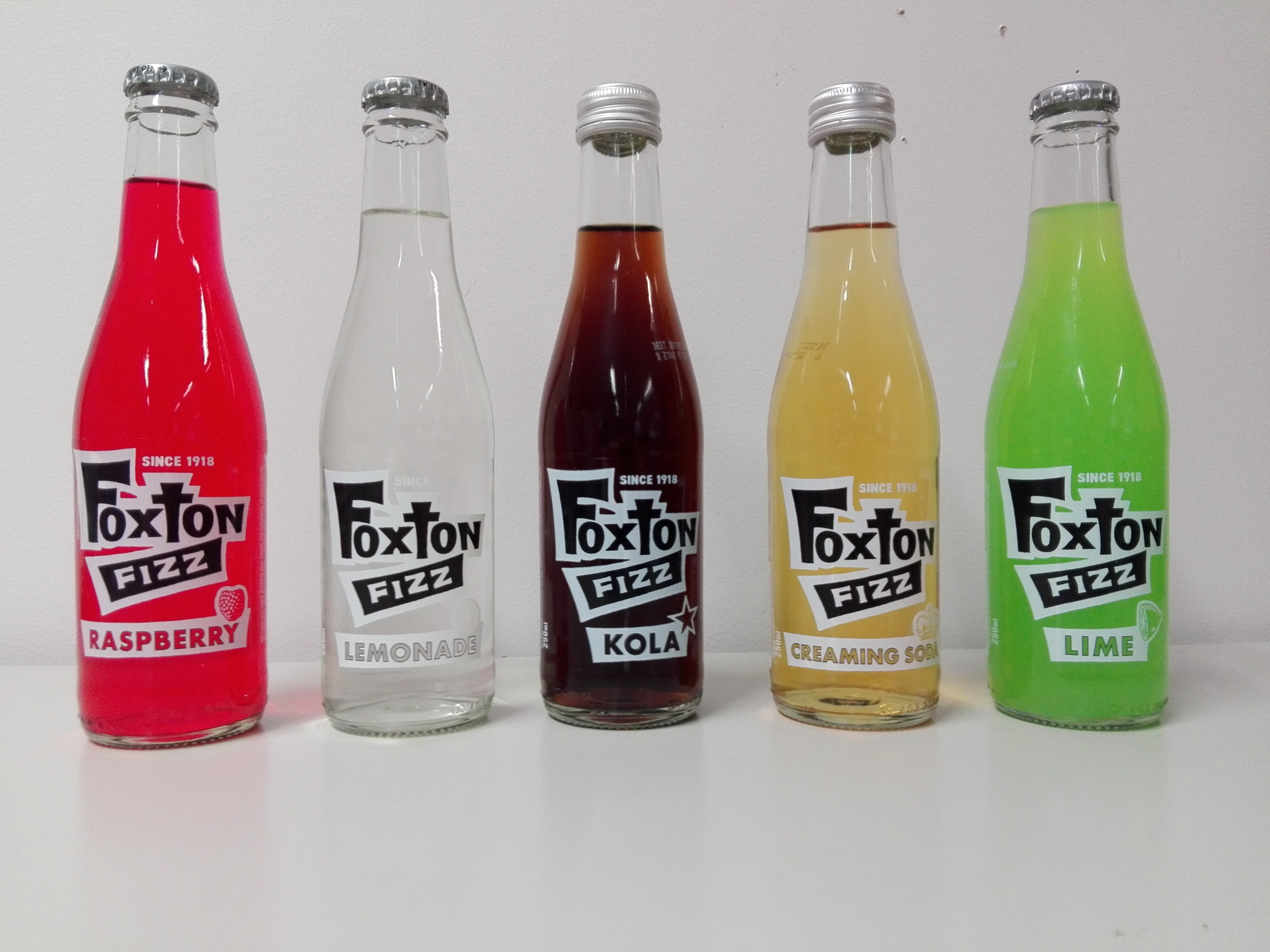
Bottles of Foxton Fizz (flavours raspberry, lemonade, kola, creaming soda and lime)

Foxton Fizz is a soft drink produced in Foxton, New Zealand, as well as the manufacturer Foxton Fizz. Foxton Fizz is one of the last independent soft drink companies in New Zealand.

== History ==
According to Foxton Fizz Ltd, the company has been in operation since 1918. There are numerous Manawatu Herald articles from 1918 which mention the cordial factory supporting the Patriotic Shop in early January, suffering a fire in February, reopening for business in March, and advertising from November to December. However, there are also Newspaper articles from 1915 advertising a job at the factory. This suggests the 1918 start date is arbitrary and incorrect. The most likely start date for Foxton's cordial factory is actually in 1913 as a Newspaper from 1938 celebrating 50 years of the Foxton Borough mentions 1913 being the factory's year of establishment.

The Foxton Fizz factory operated on 8 Whyte Street for a century, delivering their drinks around New Zealand in wooden crates. The drink was served in lunch bars and hotels. The business began to decline due to the rise in Coca-Cola sales in regional New Zealand. One initiative to try and counter the entry of Coca-Cola was offering a home drop service similar to a milk delivery. However, the service ended following the advent of vending machines.

The first identifiable owner (from 1918 at least) was William Arnold Oliver Stevenson. He ran the business until the 1st of August 1925. Before owning the cordial factory, he had been involved in the flax industry (in 1907) and Mr R. N. Speirs’ timber yard (in 1914). His time in charge was eventful with a fire in February 1918 and with him being taken to court in 1921. Stevenson was one of many cordial manufacturers in the district (Manawatu? Horowhenua?) who were prosecuted for breaching the Foods and Drugs Act, “For using saccharine in the manufacture of lemonade.” Stevenson’s lawyer, “Pleaded guilty, and stated that the defendant had used saccharin only at the time of the sugar shortage, and had he not done so he would have had to close down.” Stevenson was made to pay £2 10s, another 7s, and a further 10s 6d for the analyst's certificate.

A. E. Scot took over the business from Stevenson on the 1st of August 1925 and ran it until November of 1929. Scot was very active in many aspects of Foxton life. He was involved in the Foxton Lunch Club, Local Elections, the Returned Soldiers Committee, the Foxton Chamber of Commerce, the School Committee, and he, “Had been a faithful member of All Saints’ Church and faithful worshipper.”

In November 1929, the business changed ownership again and was registered in Wellington as the Foxton Cordial Company. It had four shareholders. They were W. F. W. Trueman the Town Clerk (151 shares), Mark Edwin Perreau (25 shares), J. W. Walker and Minnie Walker (each 62 shares). Mark Edwin Perreau, the Mayor of Foxton Borough, took over the company in 1936 and the Perreau family continued to run the business for the next seven decades.

When Murray Perreau decided to close down the company, a group of investors purchased the company. They have since relocated production from Foxton to Putaruru. Foxton Fizz beverages are found in cafes, supermarkets and dairies in New Zealand.

Foxton Fizz changed to reusable glass bottles in 1995, replacing soda siphons. Foxton Fizz began recyclable cartons in 2008. At the time of the ownership change in 2006 the company was still using the original machinery from 1918.

== Owners ==
Owners of the Cordial manufacturing business at 8 Whyte Street, Foxton
Owner(s)	Name of business/company	Years in charge
Len Freeman	Whyte's Hotel	1913 - (at least) 1915
Arnold Stevenson	The Foxton Cordial Factory	1918 (at least) - 01/08/1925
A. E. Scott	The Foxton Cordial Factory	01/08/1925 - November 1929
Partnership (W. F. W. Trueman, Mark Edwin Perreau, J. W. Walker, and Minnie Walker	Foxton Cordial Company Limited	November 1929 - 1936
The Perreau Family	Foxton Cordial Company Limited	1936 - 2006
Matt Watson	Foxton Fizz (1918) Limited	2006–present (as of 2025)

== Products ==
Foxton Fizz comes in multiple flavours, including Lime, Raspberry, Kola, Lemonade, Creaming Soda, and Cocktail. In mid-2020 the company began producing 1.5L bottle variants.
