= Manawatū College =

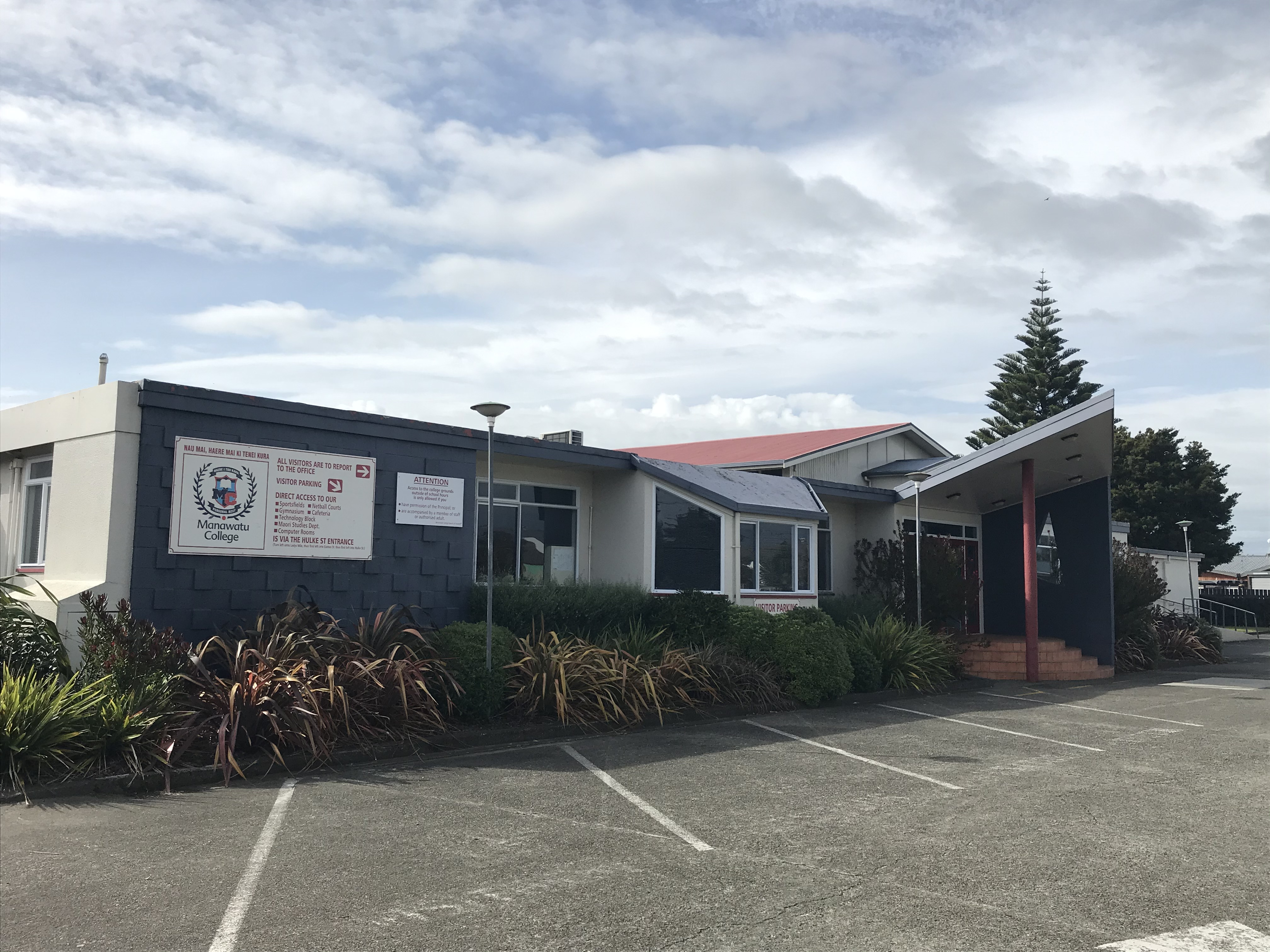
- Main entrance to Manawatū College

Location
- Lady's Mile, Foxton, New Zealand; 40.4663°S 175.2781°E

Information
- Type: State, Co-educational, Secondary
- Motto: Ki Tua i Tōu Kaha "Beyond Personal Best"
- Established: 1961
- Ministry of Education Institution no.: 205
- Principal: Matt Fraser
- Enrolment: 292 (July 2026)
- Socio-economic decile: 2F
- Website: manawatucollege.school.nz

Manawatu College (formerly known as Foxton High School) is a secondary school located in Foxton, New Zealand. Manawatu College was established in 1960, originally named Foxton High School.

== Enrolment ==
As of July 2026, Manawatū College has roll of 292 students, of which 135 (46.2%) identify as Māori.

As of 2026, the school has an Equity Index of 528, placing it amongst schools whose students have the most socioeconomic barriers to achievement (roughly equivalent to deciles 1 and 2 under the former socio-economic decile system).

== Academic Programs And Extracurricular Activities ==
Manawatu College offers a range of academic programs across various departments, including both required and optional subjects. The school provides education from Year 9 to Year 13, with specialised classes for students with special needs, who have the option to attend separate classes or integrate with the general student body. For Year 9 students, Manawatu College employs a home room system, where students have a single classroom for most subjects. Manawatu College offers a range of extracurricular activities, including sports teams, music programs, and adventure education.

== Location ==
The college is situated in Foxton, New Zealand, with three entrances:

- The main entrance on Ladys Mile.
- The staff carpark entrance also on Ladys Mile.
- The back entrance leading to the field on Hulke Street.

== House system ==
Each student belongs to a 'house group'. They compete against each other in an inter-house competition twice a term. The house group with the highest number of points at the end of each year wins the 'house cup. Each house is named after a founding member of the college.

Colour	Name
	Field
	Allen
	Robertson
	Morris

== Floods 2004 ==
In February 2004, the college became a shelter for people evacuated from Moutoa due to flooding.
