= Foxton, New Zealand =

Town in Manawatū-Whanganui, New Zealand

Foxton Te Awahou (Māori)
- Town
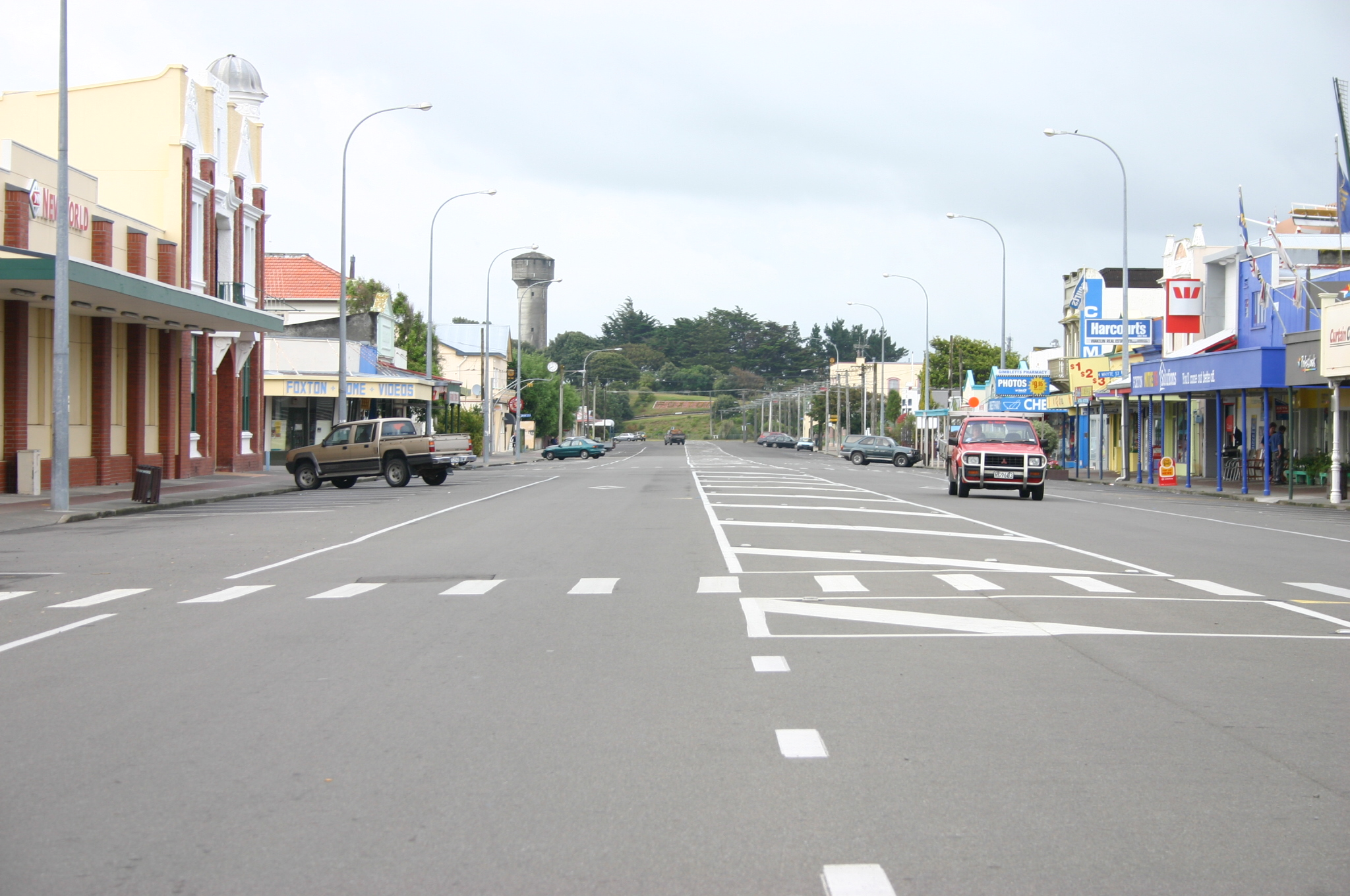
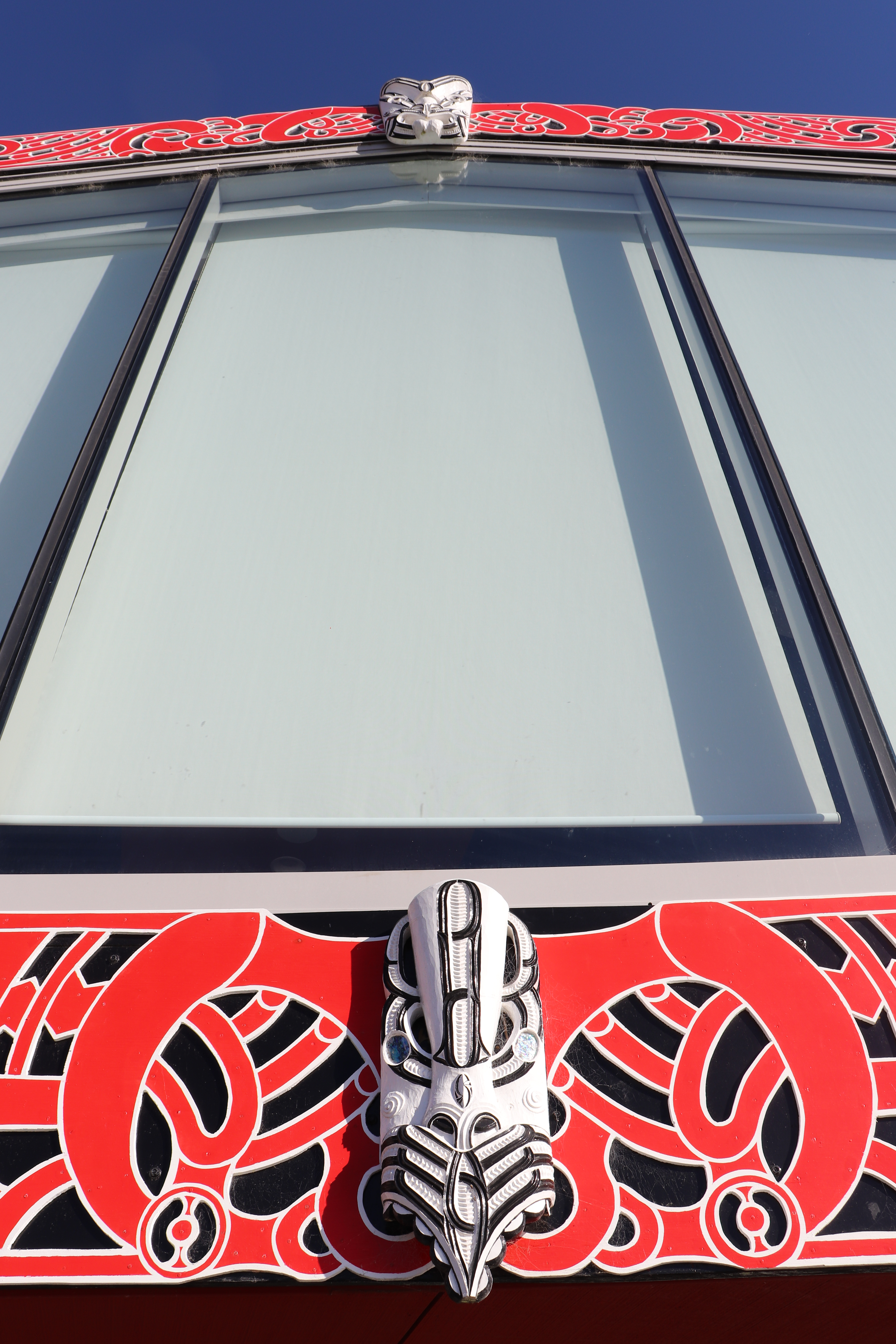
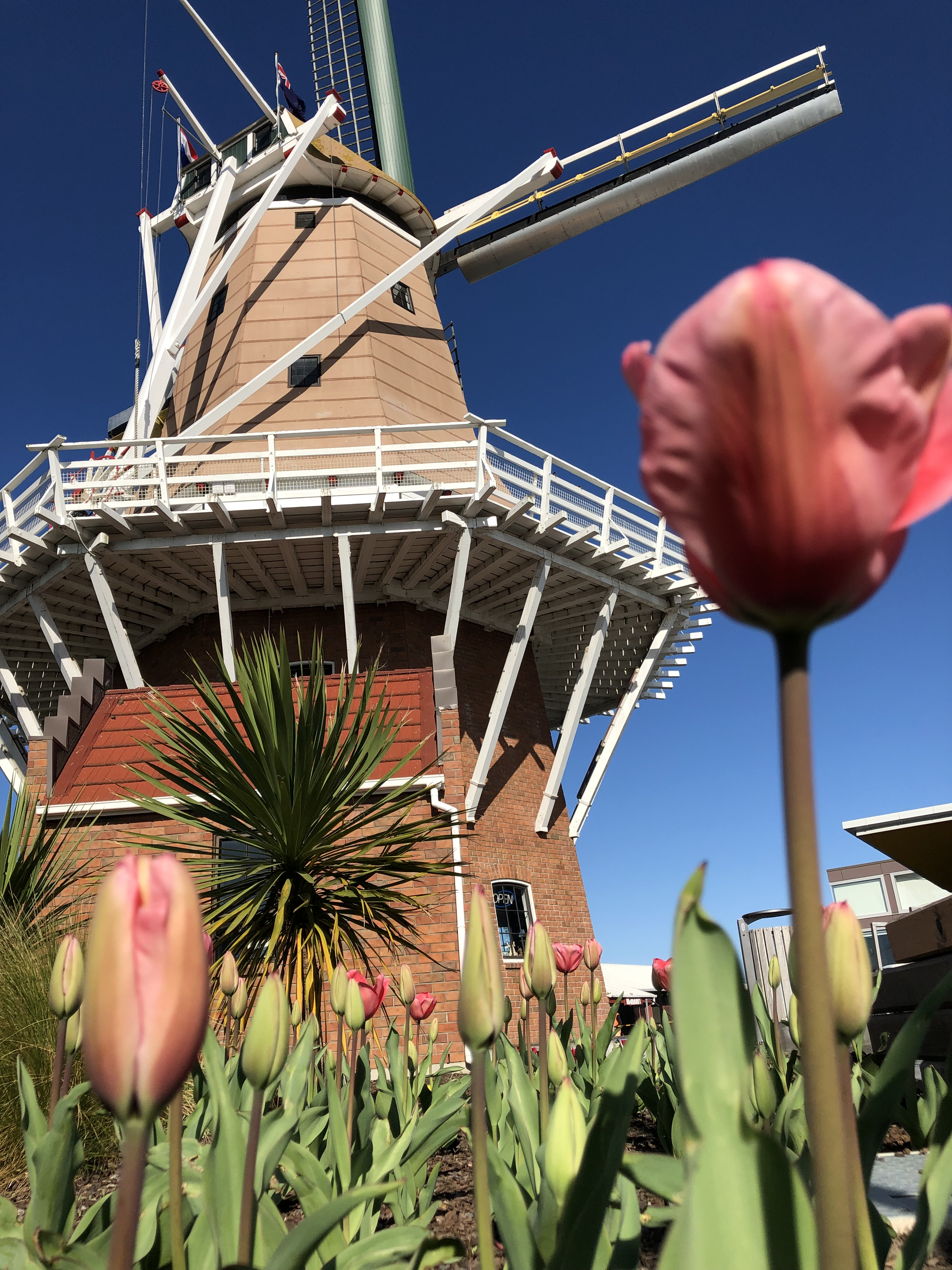
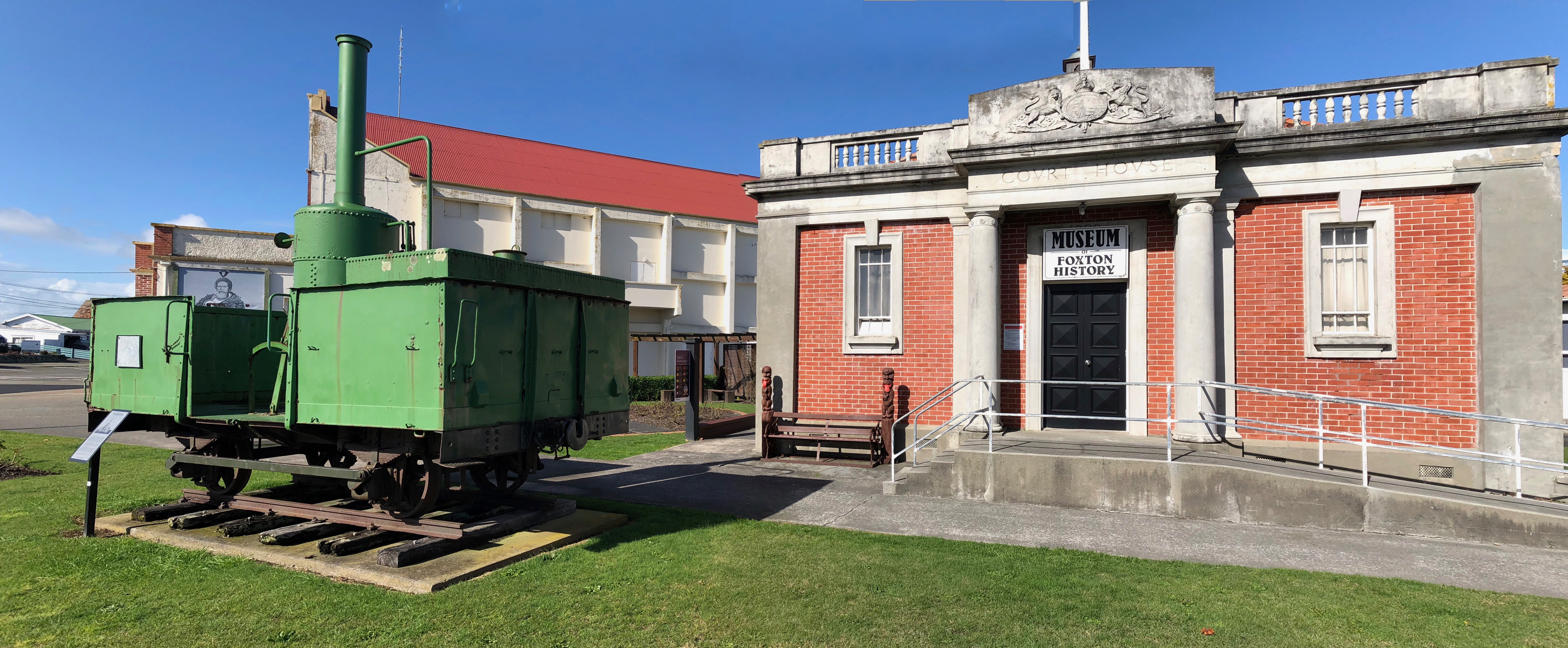
- From top, left to right: Main St Foxton, Te Awahou Nieuwe Stroom, De Molen Windmill, Court House Museum
- Interactive map of Foxton
- Coordinates: 40°28′18″S 175°17′09″E
- Country: New Zealand
- Region: Manawatū-Whanganui region
- Territorial authority: Horowhenua District
- Ward: Kere Kere General Ward; Horowhenua Māori Ward
- Community: Te Awahou Foxton Community
- Named for: William Fox
- Electorates: Rangitīkei (electorate); Te Tai Hauāuru (Māori)

Government
  - Territorial Authority: Horowhenua District Council
  - Regional council: Horizons Regional Council
  - Horowhenua Mayor: Bernie Wanden
  - Rangitīkei MP: Suze Redmayne
  - Te Tai Hauāuru MP: Debbie Ngarewa-Packer

Area
  - Total: 10.57 km^{2} (4.08 sq mi)

Population (June 2025)
  - Total: 3,520
  - Density: 333/km^{2} (863/sq mi)
- Postcode: 4814
- Area code: 06

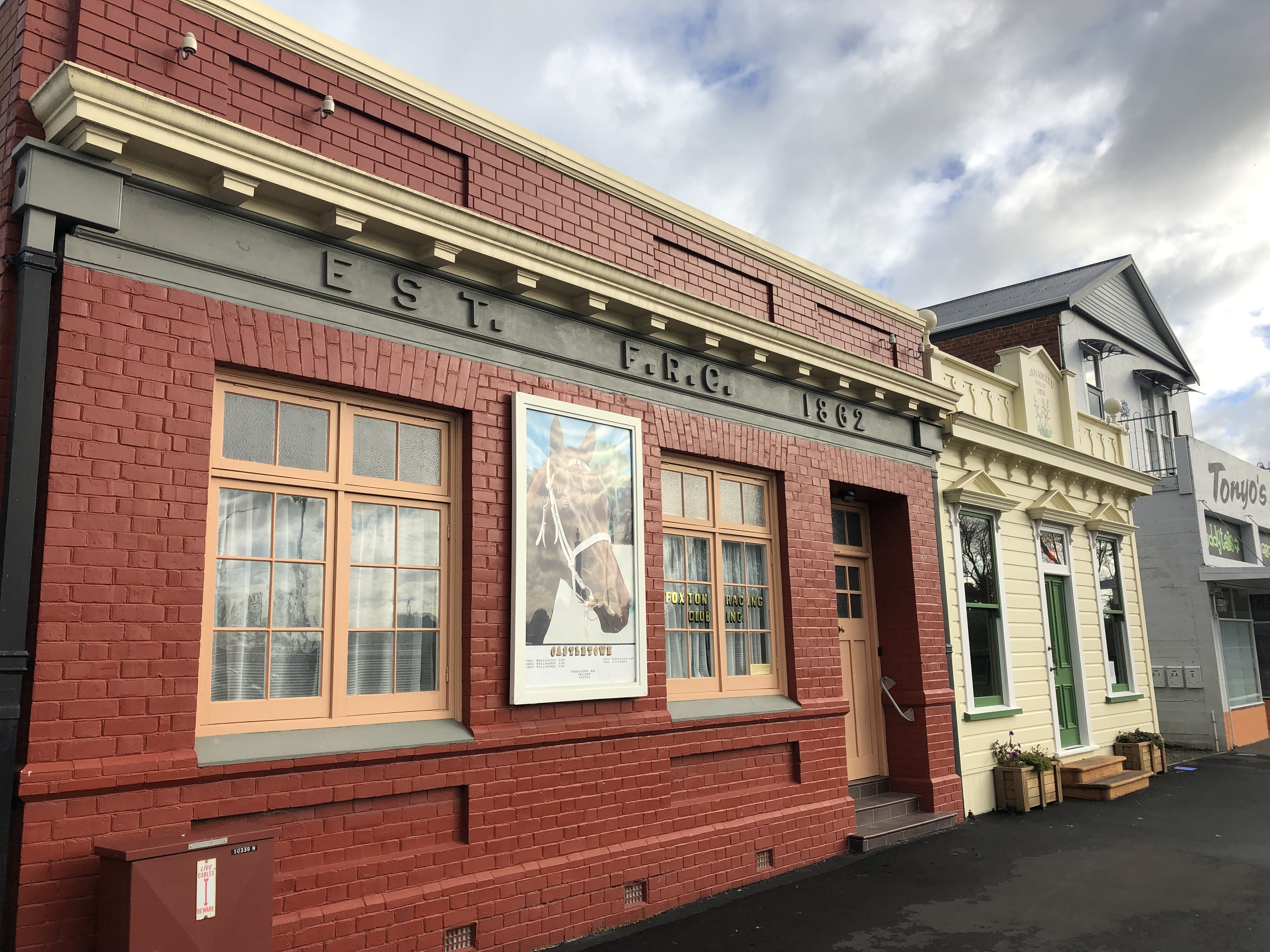

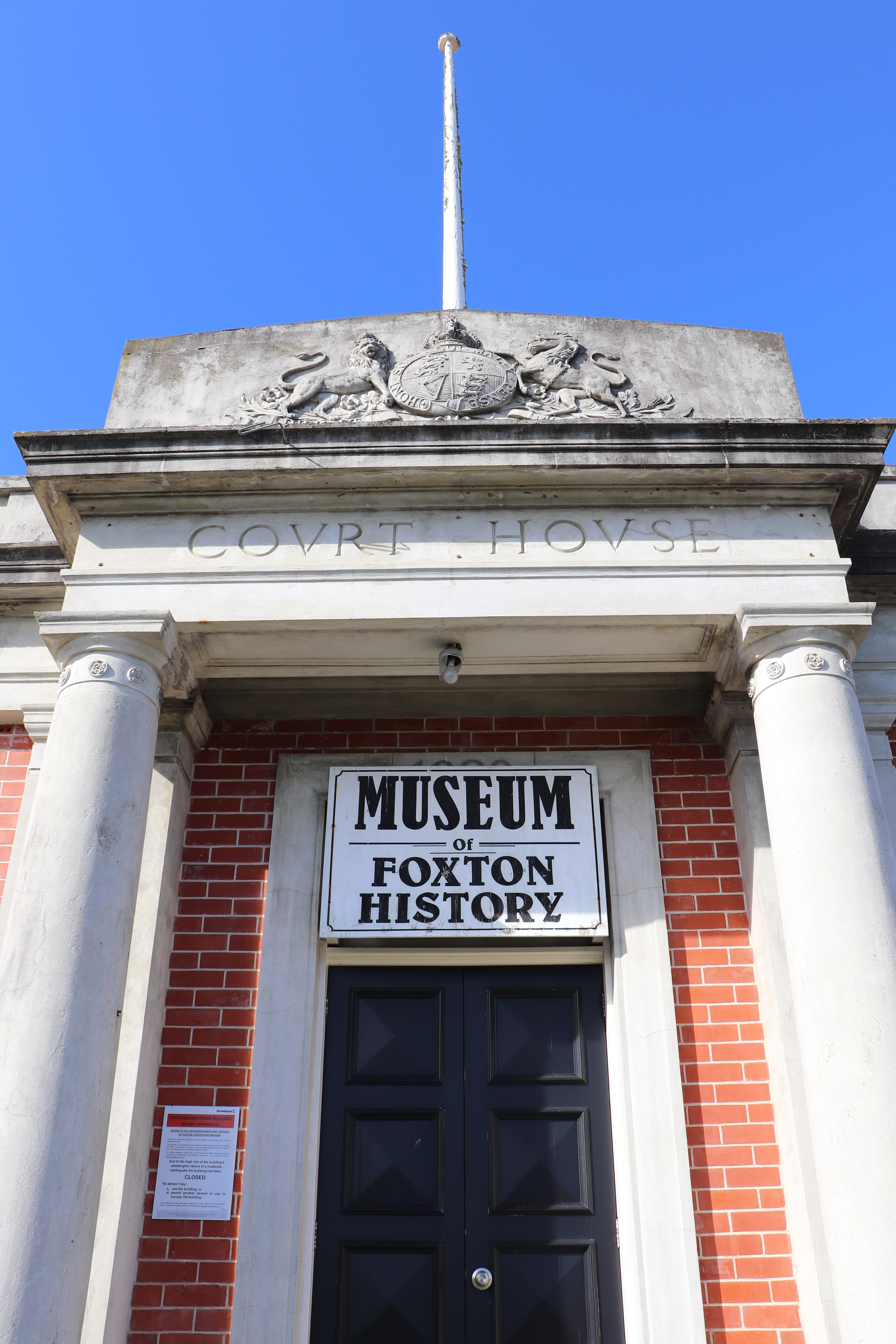

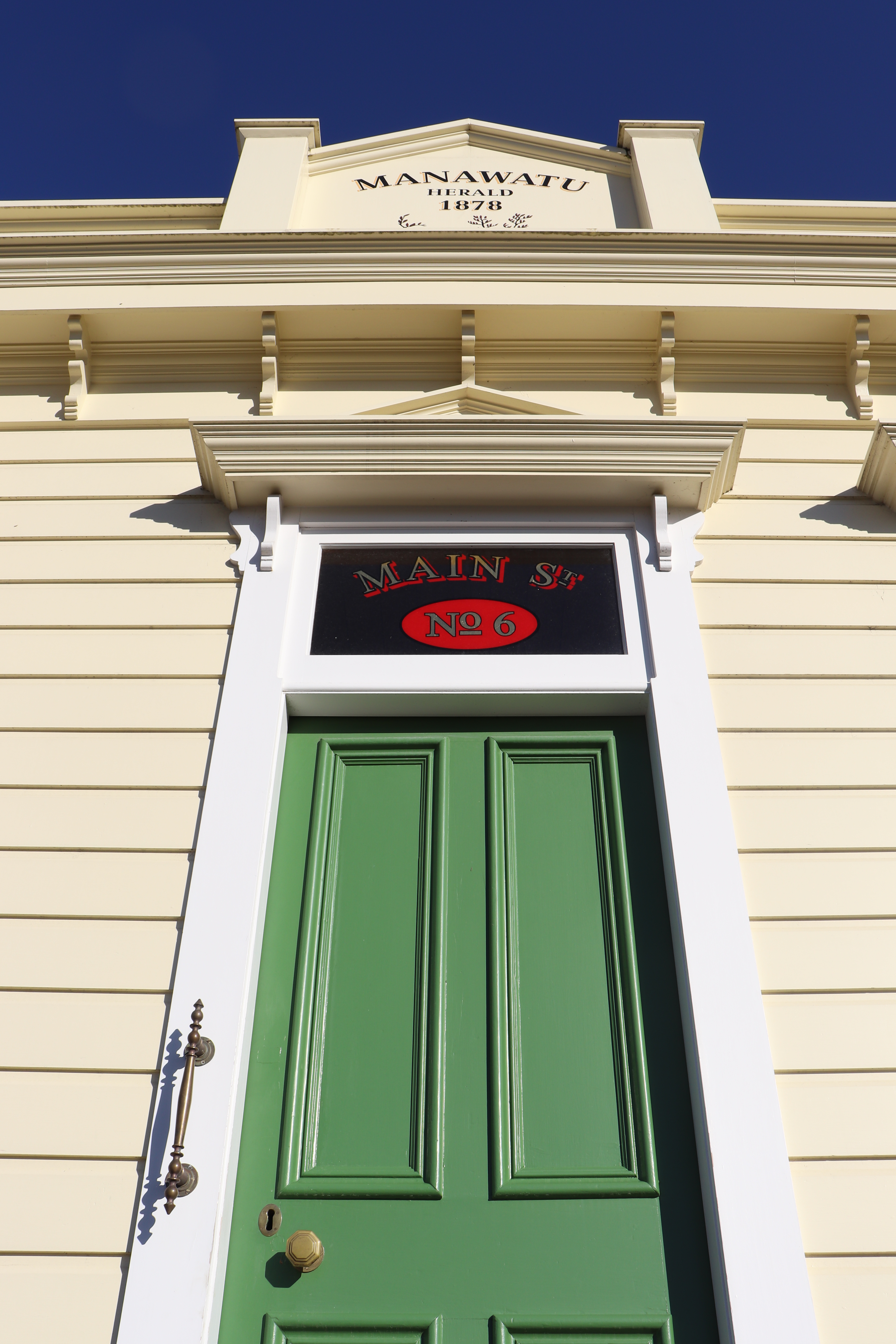
Early newspaper publisher - Manawatu Herald

Foxton (Māori: Te Awahou) is a town in the Manawatū-Whanganui region of New Zealand - on the lower west coast of the North Island, in the Horowhenua district, 30 km (19 mi) southwest of Palmerston North and just north of Levin. The town is located close to the banks of the Manawatū River. It is situated on State Highway 1, roughly in the middle between Tongariro National Park and Wellington.

The slightly smaller coastal settlement of Foxton Beach is considered part of Foxton, and is located 6 km (4 mi) to the west, on the Tasman Sea coastline.

The population was 3,520 as of June 2025.

Foxton has preserved its heritage — both Māori and Pākehā — through its parks, heritage buildings and four museums. The Manawatū River Loop and estuary creates an environment that features walkways and Ramsar wetlands with 93 species of birds.

== Changing identity ==
The 50 or so flax mills that once operated in Foxton's vicinity slowly disappeared before WWII, while the Feltex carpet factory closed in 2008, causing unemployment. What was once an industrious flax industry town, had to reinvent itself.

These days, Foxton is trying to create a new local economy, by attracting visitors from throughout the region. Several cafés intersperse the boutique shops on Main Street. A Cultural Park includes a Dutch windmill, a Māori carving workshop and the Flax Stripper Museum. De Molen hosts some 45,000 customers p.a. - while the multi-cultural community and visitor hub Te Awahou Nieuwe Stroom, attracts some 150,000 users through its doors annually.

As the centre piece of the Cultural Park, the Te Awahou Nieuwe Stroom facility was awarded a top 'excellence' museum award in 2018. The Piriharakeke and Oranjehof museums, a gallery, and exhibitions enable visitors to reflect on their own heritage and family's roots. The multi-cultural and multi-lingual Te Awahou Nieuwe Stroom reflects diversity, and offers learning spaces through its library, heritage room and children's area with educational toys.

Foxton Beach caters to those interested in active life-style pursuits.

According to the Department of Conservation: "The diversity and number of wading and shore birds that visit the Manawatu Estuary make it one of the best bird watching spots in the country." Foxton Beach is a popular swimming and fishing spot that is patrolled in the weekends and public holidays in summer by the Foxton Surf Life Saving Club.

== Origins ==
The first inhabitants of the Manawatū area were Māori who probably arrived in the thirteenth or fourteenth century. Compared to other parts of the North Island the district was sparsely populated, but there was a major marae at Matakarapa, across the river from Te Awahou (now Foxton) as well as kāinga (villages) and pā (fortified villages) along much of the river. A number of tribes have occupied the area; the Rangitāne had replaced the Ngāti Ara and the Ngāti Mamoe by the 1800s and were in their turn invaded by the Ngāti Toa and allies so that in the 1840s the site of Te Awahou (which was to become Foxton) was occupied by the Ngāti Ngarongo and Ngati Takihiku under the leadership of Ihakara Tukumaru.

Foxton is the oldest European settlement in the southern Manawatū, although it was not the first. The original European settlement was Paiaka to the east, closer to the present town of Shannon in 1844. When Paiaka was largely destroyed by an earthquake in 1855 the settlers moved downstream to Te Awahou, which was named "Foxton" from 1866. In the early years of European settlement it was an important trading post and shipping port as the sea was the easiest way to transport goods and people to the Manawatū. The Manawatū River was then the main access to the rich hinterland. The west coast of the lower North Island is not naturally supplied with harbours and the Foxton harbour had a dangerous bar at the river mouth. As the only real harbour between Whanganui and Wellington it was used anyway.

== History ==
Foxton was named after Sir William Fox, and has a history of flax stripping, which was used to make wool packs, matting and rope. Other industries associated with the town have included clothing manufacturing and sawmilling. The town is known for producing the soda drink Foxton Fizz, which commenced operation at 8 Whyte Street in 1918 although the products are now made in Putāruru.

Early on, Foxton became a thriving regional centre, and with that status came a newspaper - the Manawatu Herald (est. in 1878).

It was only with the advent of the Palmerston North to Wellington railway that Palmerston North began to overtake it as the most important centre in the Manawatū. The central government had originally proposed that Foxton was to be on the route of the main line from Wellington to Auckland via Palmerston North, and a tramway linking Foxton and Palmerston North was upgraded into the Foxton Branch railway in the 1870s. However, due to government delays in extending the line further south, a group of Wellingtonian businessmen established the Wellington and Manawatu Railway (WMR), which announced in February 1881 that the "West Coast" line would run to Longburn, bypassing Foxton. This was a shorter and more direct route to Napier and Auckland, and avoided "unproductive country".

When this line opened in 1886, Foxton's status as a port slipped, and this position deteriorated further when the WMR was incorporated into the government's national rail network in 1908. The branch railway closed in 1959, leaving only road access to the town.

The mycologist Kathleen Curtis (1892–1994) was born in Foxton.

=== Flax booms ===
The local Flax Stripper Museum tells the history of the once thriving flax industry, and claims Foxton as the Flax Capital of New Zealand.

NZ Flax (Phormium tenax) played a major role in Foxton's development; indeed Foxton, rather than being a "gold town" or "coal town" was indisputably a "flax town", sending their product overseas to be used worldwide as a substitute for manila.

The first traders at Paiaka and Shannon traded mostly for flax from the Maori, which was sent to Sydney. The first of the flax booms began in 1869, lasting for four years during which 22,000 tonnes of fibre passed through Foxton's port. The late 1880s saw a short-lived flax boom that briefly allowed Foxton to once again grow and function as a bustling port.

A third flax boom, begun in 1898, was the most lasting and saw another increase in shipping, with over 10 steamers making regular visits. In 1903 the Moutoa Estate was developed as the main supply of flax. By 1908 problems with river silting and bar strandings meant that coastal shipping was avoiding Foxton. By 1916 there were only two ships coming into the port but in that year 97,000 bales of flax were shipped out from Foxton.

=== The Whirokino Cut ===
Deforestation of the inland Manawatū District in the late nineteenth century meant increased flooding and led to the creation of stopbanks, floodgates, and the Whirokino Cut. Completed in 1943 as part of the Lower Manawatu Flood Control Scheme, it was intended as a spillway but an unexpected flood broke through the upper end and diverted the river down the spillway, cutting off the Foxton loop of the river and causing great outcry at the time. The Ministry of Works said this was unintentional, but some residents felt it was done purposefully. The Foxton Loop now only has a tidal flow and is not connected to the river at its top end, the upper end of the Loop having silted up during a flood in 1953.

Though the Whirokino Cut is sometimes claimed as the reason Foxton failed to operate as a port, the dangerous bar and persistent silting were already providing problems and by the time the Cut was in place most shipping was already avoiding Foxton – it had already ceased to function as a port as early as 1942.

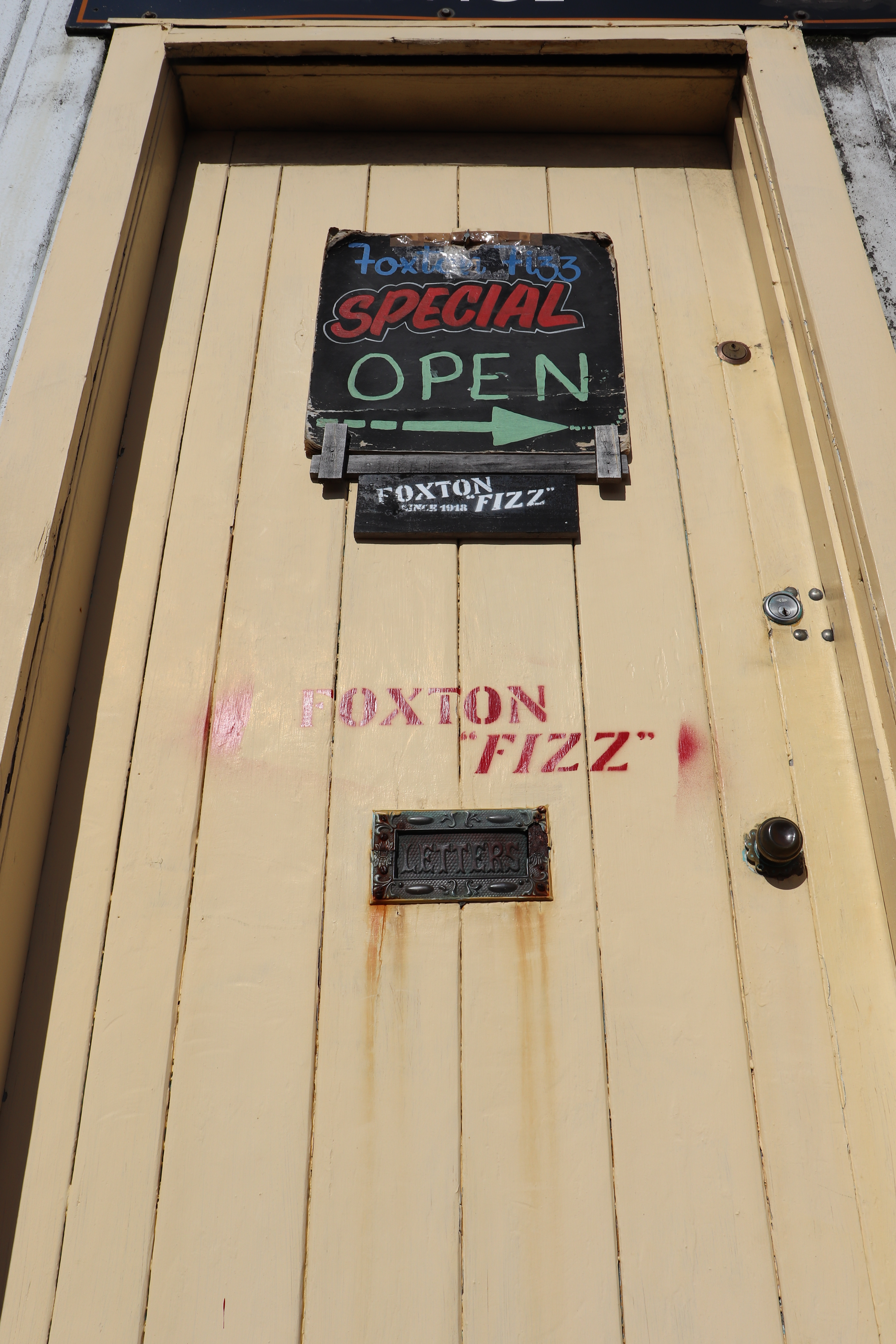
Door of the 1918 factory

The nearby Foxton Beach offers wetlands of international significance with godwits and multiple species of other rare birdlife, and a beach that is popular with surfers, swimmers and anglers.

== Demographics ==
Foxton is described by Statistics New Zealand as a small urban area. It covers 10.57 km^{2} (4.08 sq mi) and had an estimated population of 3,520 as of June 2025, with a population density of 333 people per km^{2}.

Historical population
Year	Pop.	±% p.a.
2006	2,958	—
2013	2,871	−0.43%
2018	3,141	+1.81%
2023	3,384	+1.50%
The 2006 population is for a larger area of 11.57 km^{2}. Source:

Foxton had a population of 3,384 in the 2023 New Zealand census, an increase of 243 people (7.7%) since the 2018 census, and an increase of 513 people (17.9%) since the 2013 census. There were 1,662 males, 1,710 females, and 12 people of other genders in 1,326 dwellings. 2.7% of people identified as LGBTIQ+. The median age was 42.3 years (compared with 38.1 years nationally). There were 654 people (19.3%) aged under 15 years, 588 (17.4%) aged 15 to 29, 1,341 (39.6%) aged 30 to 64, and 801 (23.7%) aged 65 or older.

People could identify as more than one ethnicity. The results were 81.0% European (Pākehā); 38.1% Māori; 5.2% Pasifika; 2.5% Asian; 0.3% Middle Eastern, Latin American and African New Zealanders (MELAA); and 2.0% other, which includes people giving their ethnicity as "New Zealander". English was spoken by 97.3%, Māori by 7.7%, Samoan by 0.4%, and other languages by 3.9%. No language could be spoken by 2.0% (e.g. too young to talk). New Zealand Sign Language was known by 0.9%. The percentage of people born overseas was 9.3, compared with 28.8% nationally.

Religious affiliations were 25.3% Christian, 0.1% Hindu, 0.1% Islam, 2.3% Māori religious beliefs, 0.1% Buddhist, 0.6% New Age, and 0.8% other religions. People who answered that they had no religion were 62.9%, and 7.8% of people did not answer the census question.

Of those at least 15 years old, 249 (9.1%) people had a bachelor's or higher degree, 1,524 (55.8%) had a post-high school certificate or diploma, and 957 (35.1%) people exclusively held high school qualifications. The median income was $30,400, compared with $41,500 nationally. 99 people (3.6%) earned over $100,000 compared to 12.1% nationally. The employment status of those at least 15 was 1,164 (42.6%) full-time, 339 (12.4%) part-time, and 90 (3.3%) unemployed.

Individual statistical areas
Name	Area (km^{2})	Population	Density (per km^{2})	Dwellings	Median age	Median income
Foxton North	6.54	1,527	233	597	43.3 years	$30,000
Foxton South	4.04	1,857	460	729	41.4 years	$30,800
New Zealand					38.1 years	$41,500

=== Kere Kere ===
Kere Kere statistical area surrounds but does not include Foxton or Foxton Beach. It covers 229.65 km^{2} (88.67 sq mi) and had an estimated population of 1,100 as of June 2025, with a population density of 4.79 people per km^{2}.

Historical population
Year	Pop.	±% p.a.
2006	807	—
2013	870	+1.08%
2018	921	+1.15%
2023	1,005	+1.76%
The 2006 population is for a smaller area of 228.56 km^{2}. Source:

Kere Kere had a population of 1,005 in the 2023 New Zealand census, an increase of 84 people (9.1%) since the 2018 census, and an increase of 135 people (15.5%) since the 2013 census. There were 531 males, 471 females, and 6 people of other genders in 384 dwellings. 2.4% of people identified as LGBTIQ+. The median age was 40.0 years (compared with 38.1 years nationally). There were 195 people (19.4%) aged under 15 years, 168 (16.7%) aged 15 to 29, 477 (47.5%) aged 30 to 64, and 171 (17.0%) aged 65 or older.

People could identify as more than one ethnicity. The results were 84.2% European (Pākehā), 19.1% Māori, 3.0% Pasifika, 9.3% Asian, and 3.0% other, which includes people giving their ethnicity as "New Zealander". English was spoken by 97.6%, Māori by 2.7%, Samoan by 0.3%, and other languages by 6.3%. No language could be spoken by 2.1% (e.g. too young to talk). New Zealand Sign Language was known by 0.6%. The percentage of people born overseas was 16.4, compared with 28.8% nationally.

Religious affiliations were 29.3% Christian, 0.9% Islam, 0.3% Māori religious beliefs, 0.3% Buddhist, 0.3% New Age, and 0.6% other religions. People who answered that they had no religion were 61.5%, and 6.9% of people did not answer the census question.

Of those at least 15 years old, 108 (13.3%) people had a bachelor's or higher degree, 474 (58.5%) had a post-high school certificate or diploma, and 231 (28.5%) people exclusively held high school qualifications. The median income was $43,700, compared with $41,500 nationally. 66 people (8.1%) earned over $100,000 compared to 12.1% nationally. The employment status of those at least 15 was 465 (57.4%) full-time, 123 (15.2%) part-time, and 18 (2.2%) unemployed.

== Climate ==
The area is sand country with a temperate climate, average monthly temperatures ranging from 8 °C (July) to 17.4 °C (January), with a minimum/maximum of −4 °C to 27 °C. Foxton has an average of about 2,000 sunshine hours a year, and average precipitation of about 900 mm annually. The prevailing winds in the area are west-northwest and have driven the sand back from the coast to create the most extensive transgressive sand dune system in New Zealand.

== Transport ==
SH1 runs through Foxton. The town is served by three InterCity buses a day and a commuter bus runs to Palmerston North at 7:05 am, returning at 5:20 pm. There is also a shoppers' bus to Levin on Fridays.

== Features ==
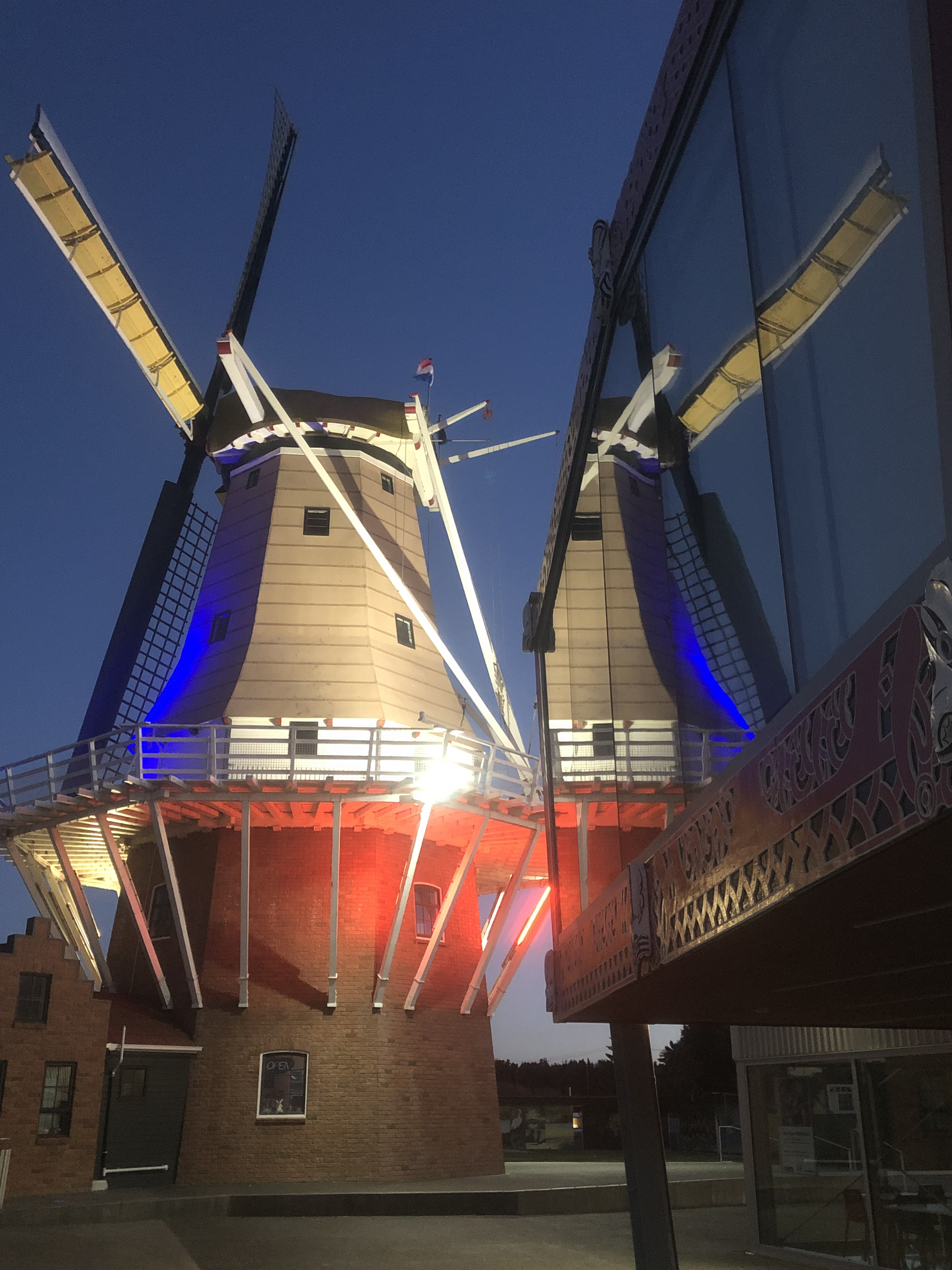
De Molen and Te Awahou front

Te Awahou Nieuwe Stroom and the Cultural Park is located in the centre of town. The fully restored BNZ building on Main Street, and the oldest cottage in the region 'Nye Cottage' on Harbour Street are both within view of the Park. In 2003, a full size replica of a Dutch windmill, called De Molen was completed and opened. This working Stellingmolen windmill produces stone-ground flour, which can be purchased inside the mill's Dutch Deli. Visitors can climb up three floors, to witness the wooden mechanical workings of the mill in action - examples of traditional Dutch 17th Century engineering. The miller sets the blades in motion on windy days, and is available for tours to explain the history of milling, or for a more casual conversation.

The Foxton Fizz factory, opened in 1918, is open to visitors.

The National Museum of Audio Visual Arts & Sciences, also known as the MAVTech Museum, opened in the 1970s. It's located in authentic restored movie theatre, first opened as the Coronation Hall in 1911, was exhibits the development of audiovisual technology.

The Foxton Courthouse building houses the Foxton Museum, which was closed due to earthquake risk.

Flax Stripper Museum, a museum about the area's flax industry history, opened in 1990.

== Education ==
Manawatū College is a state secondary school, with a roll of 292. It was established in 1961, replacing Foxton District High School.

Foxton has two state primary schools for Year 1 to 8 students:

- Foxton Primary School has a roll of 86. A Foxton School was advertising for a master in early 1868 and the school was extant the following year. A new wooden building was opened in 1906, but it burned in 1918 and was replaced by a brick building in 1920. In 1927, the school added a secondary department to become Foxton District High School. When Manawatū College opened in 1961, it became Foxton Primary. The brick building, considered an earthquake risk, was demolished in 1974.
- Coley Street School has a roll of 214. Coley Street School opened in 1967.

St Mary's School is a state-integrated Catholic primary school for Year 1 to 8 students, with a roll of 39. It opened in 1911.

All these schools are co-educational. Rolls are as of July 2026.
