= Shannon railway station =

Railway station in New Zealand

Shannon
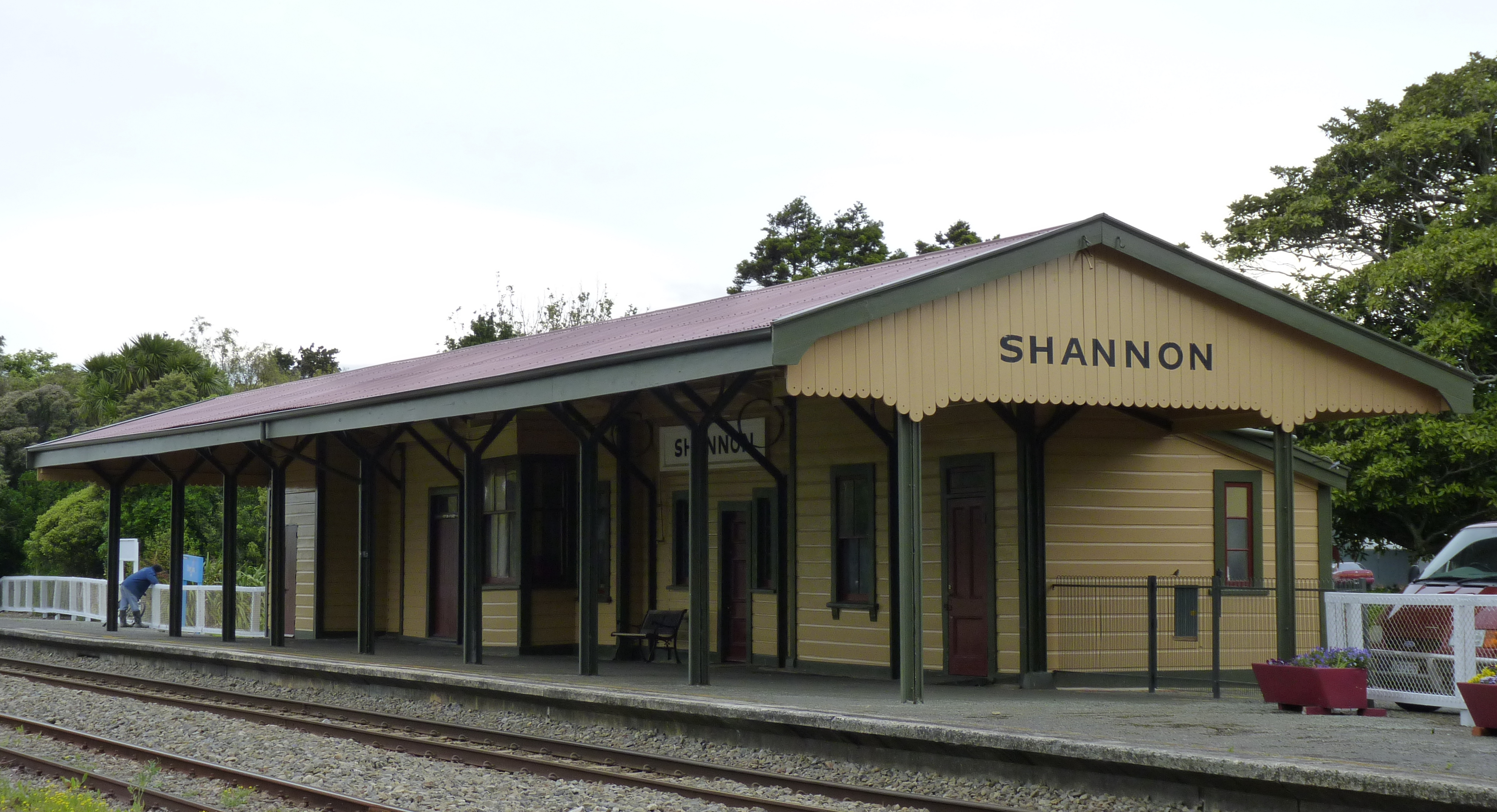

General information
- Location: Plimmer Terrace, Shannon, New Zealand
- Coordinates: 40.5465°S 175.4111°E
- Elevation: 12 m (39 ft)
- Owner: KiwiRail
- Line: North Island Main Trunk
- Distance: Wellington 106.63 km (66.26 mi)

Construction
- Parking: Yes

Other information
- Classification: RHTNZ Category B building

History
- Opened: 2 August 1886
- Rebuilt: 1893

Services
Preceding station	KiwiRail	Following station
Palmerston North Terminus	Capital Connection	Levin towards Wellington

Historic railways
Preceding station	Historical railways	Following station
Makerua; Line open, station closed 4.69 km (2.91 mi)	North Island Main Trunk; KiwiRail	Koputaroa; Line open, station closed 7.89 km (4.90 mi)

Heritage New Zealand – Category 1
- Designated: 25-Sep-1986
- Reference no.: 4703
Location

Shannon railway station is a station on the North Island Main Trunk serving Shannon in the Horowhenua District of New Zealand.

It is served by the Capital Connection long distance commuter train between Wellington and Palmerston North, which in 2030 will be replaced by the New Zealand BEMU class electric multiple unit. The station platform will be upgraded.

== History ==
A simple Class 6 or flag station type building was opened by the Wellington and Manawatu Railway Company (WMR)—a private company—in 1886 as an intermediate station on the Wellington–Manawatu Line, and was named after company director George Shannon. Other company directors had the stations at Levin and Plimmerton named after them. Shannon opened on Monday 2 August 1886, when trains started to run between Longburn and Ōtaki, though a special train had run from Longburn to Ohau in April 1886. The first through train from Wellington to Palmerston North ran on 30 November 1886.

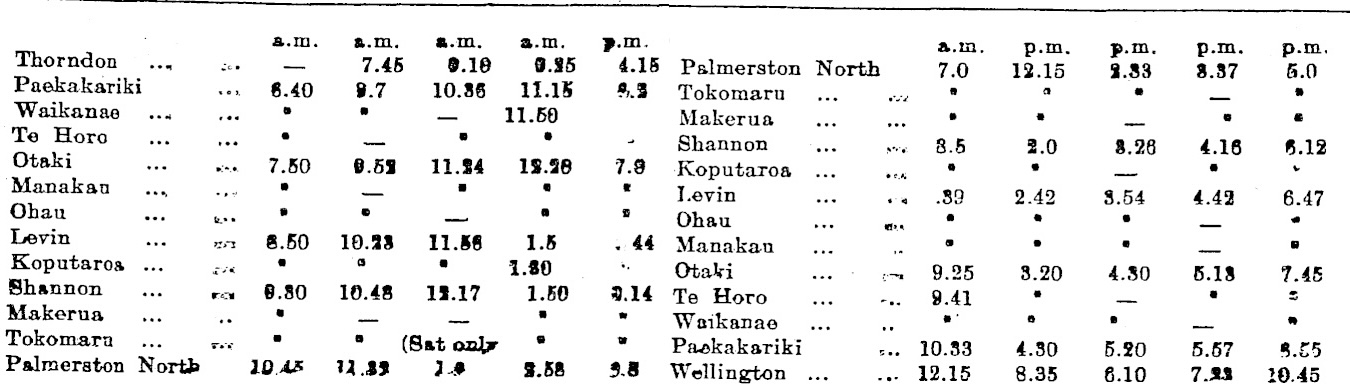
Wellington-Palmerston North 1913 timetable

In 1893, the original station building was moved to Paraparaumu and replaced by a WMR Class Four building. Later a luggage/parcels room (1902) and a verandah (1910) were added. Further stock sidings were added prior to World War I to cope with increased demand. Further sidings were built after the war when the Mangahao Power Station was under construction. The parcel and luggage room was extended in 1936.

Railway traffic declined after the second world war and the station closed in 1980, but use has since been established again for the Capital Connection. The Shannon Railway Trust was founded in 1985 with the aim to preserve the building. Horowhenua District Council bought the building in 1992. It was subsequently restored by the trust and reopened in 1998 for community use, as a tourist destination, and an info centre.

The 1893 replacement building is one of the few remaining physical relics of the WMR and it is rare that a station of this age built from timber survives. For this reason, the New Zealand Historic Places Trust (now Heritage New Zealand) added the station to its register as a Category I listing on 25 September 1986.
