= Queen Street (Levin) railway station =

Defunct railway station in New Zealand

Queen Street railway station
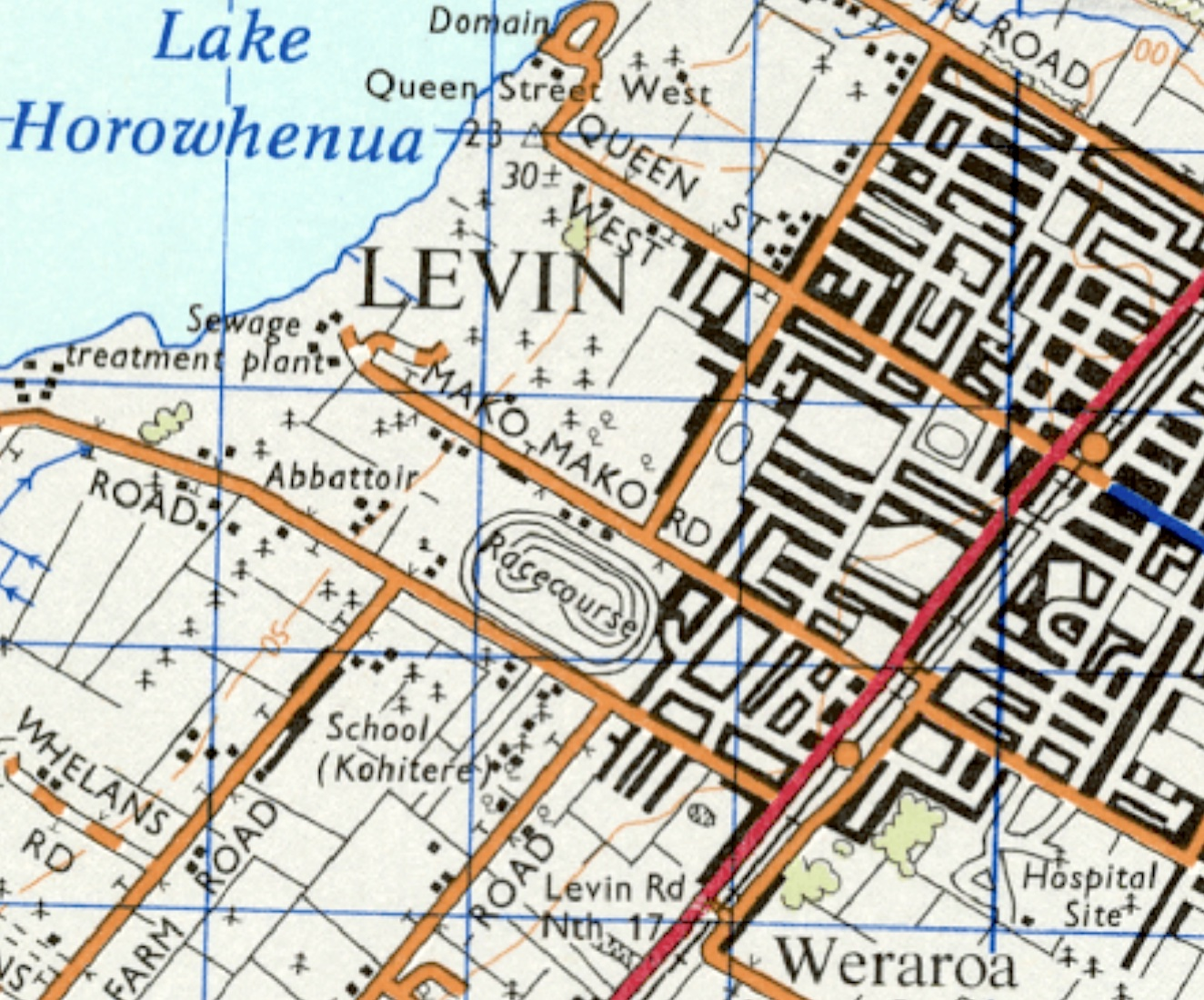
- 1973 map of Levin showing both stations

General information
- Location: Queen Street E, Levin, New Zealand
- Coordinates: 40.622057°S 175.28763°E
- Elevation: 37 m (121 ft)
- Line: North Island Main Trunk
- Distance: Wellington 91.67 km (56.96 mi)

History
- Opened: 16 July 1956
- Closed: 17 December 1977

Services
| Preceding station | Historical railways | Following station |
|---|---|---|
| Koputaroa; Line open, station closed 7.89 km (4.90 mi) | North Island Main Trunk; KiwiRail | Levin; Line open, station open 1.65 km (1.03 mi) |
Location

Queen Street (Levin) railway station was a station on the North Island Main Trunk in New Zealand, serving Levin.

It was a passenger-only stopping place, opened on 16 July, or 11 June 1956 and closed on 17 December 1977.

== History ==
The railway through Queen Street was opened by the Wellington and Manawatu Railway Company on Monday 2 August 1886, when trains started to run between Longburn and Ōtaki, though a special train had run from Longburn to Ohau in April 1886. The first through train from Wellington to Palmerston North ran on 30 November 1886.

New Zealand Railways Department took over the line in 1908 and, in 1955, work began on a 16 ft (4.9 m) by 6 ft (1.8 m) Road Services-type shelter, with a light, timber floor and concrete piles, on a timber fronted, 220 ft (67 m) sealed platform, 8 in (20 cm) above rail level, able to take two twin-car sets. It cost £744.1.11. New steps were built in 1963 and the platform was tar sealed.

Tenders for removal were sought in 1978 and it went in 1985.
