= Koputaroa railway station =

Defunct railway station in New Zealand

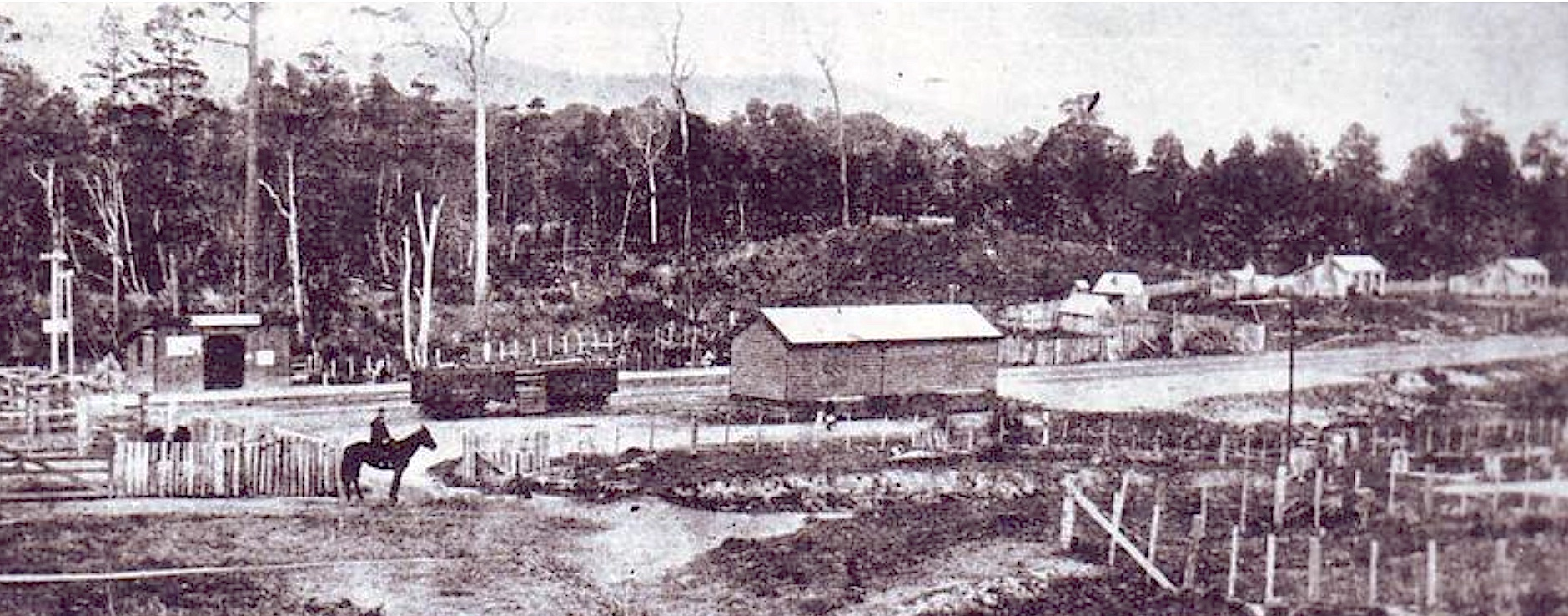
- Kereru in 1890s before renaming as Koputarua and then Koputaroa

General information
- Location: Koputaroa Road, Koputaroa, New Zealand
- Coordinates: 40.575853°S 175.341115°E
- Elevation: 9 m (30 ft)
- Line: North Island Main Trunk
- Distance: Wellington 99.56 km (61.86 mi)

History
- Opened: 2 August 1886
- Closed: passengers by December 1975 goods 13 October 1986
- Former names: Kereru until 29 February 1906; Koputarua until 15 April 1909

Services
Preceding station	Historical railways	Following station
Shannon; Line open, station open 7.07 km (4.39 mi)	North Island Main Trunk; KiwiRail	Queen Street (Levin); Line open, station closed 7.89 km (4.90 mi)
Location

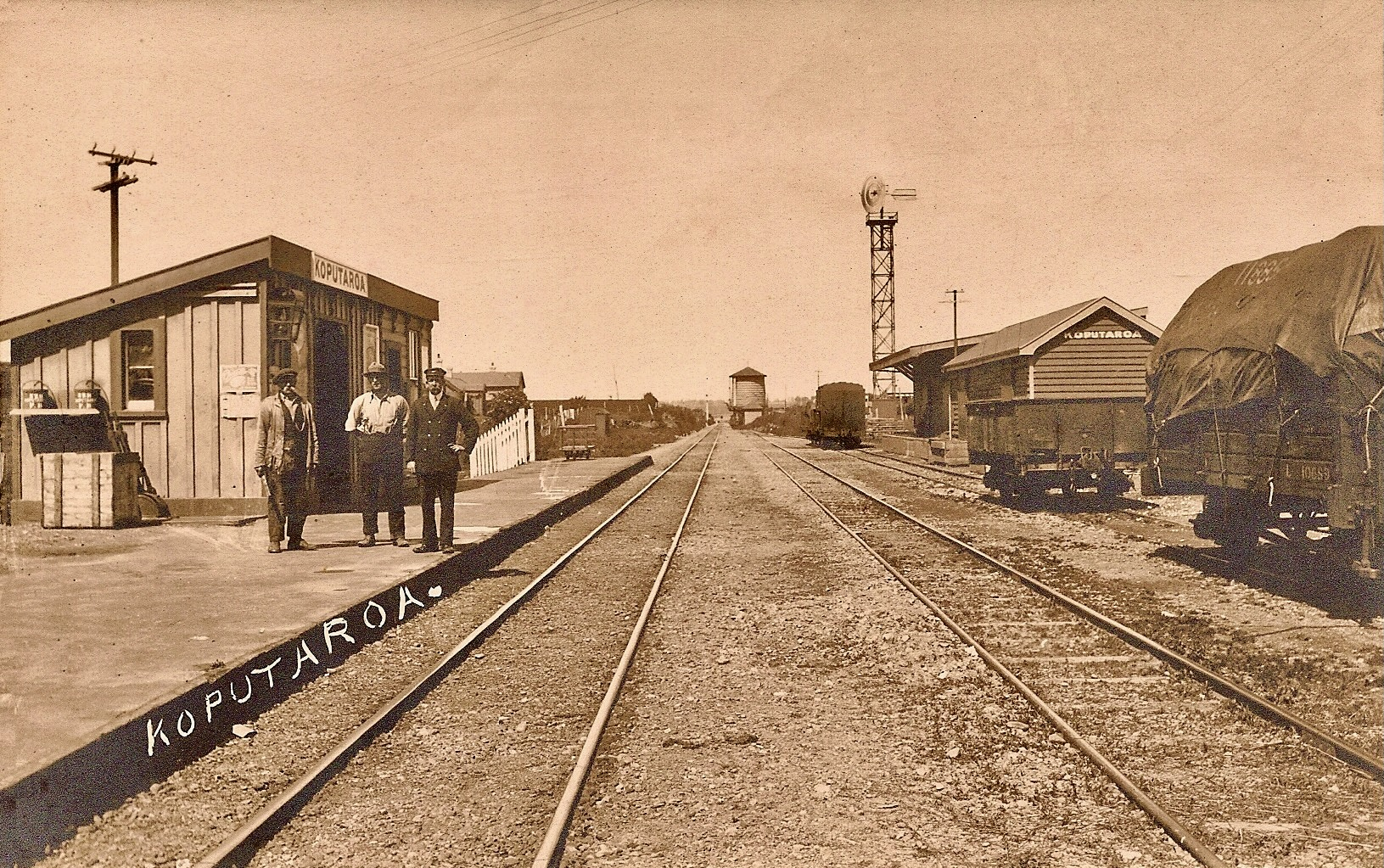
Postcard of Koputaroa railway station

Koputaroa railway station was a station at Koputaroa in Horowhenua District on the North Island Main Trunk in New Zealand.

== Name ==
The Ministry for Culture and Heritage gives a translation of "long snare for catching parakeets" for Koputaroa. On 29 February 1906 the name of station was changed from Kereru to Koputarua, to avoid confusion with Kereru in Hawkes Bay. On 15 April 1909 the spelling was corrected from Koputarua to Koputaroa.

== History ==
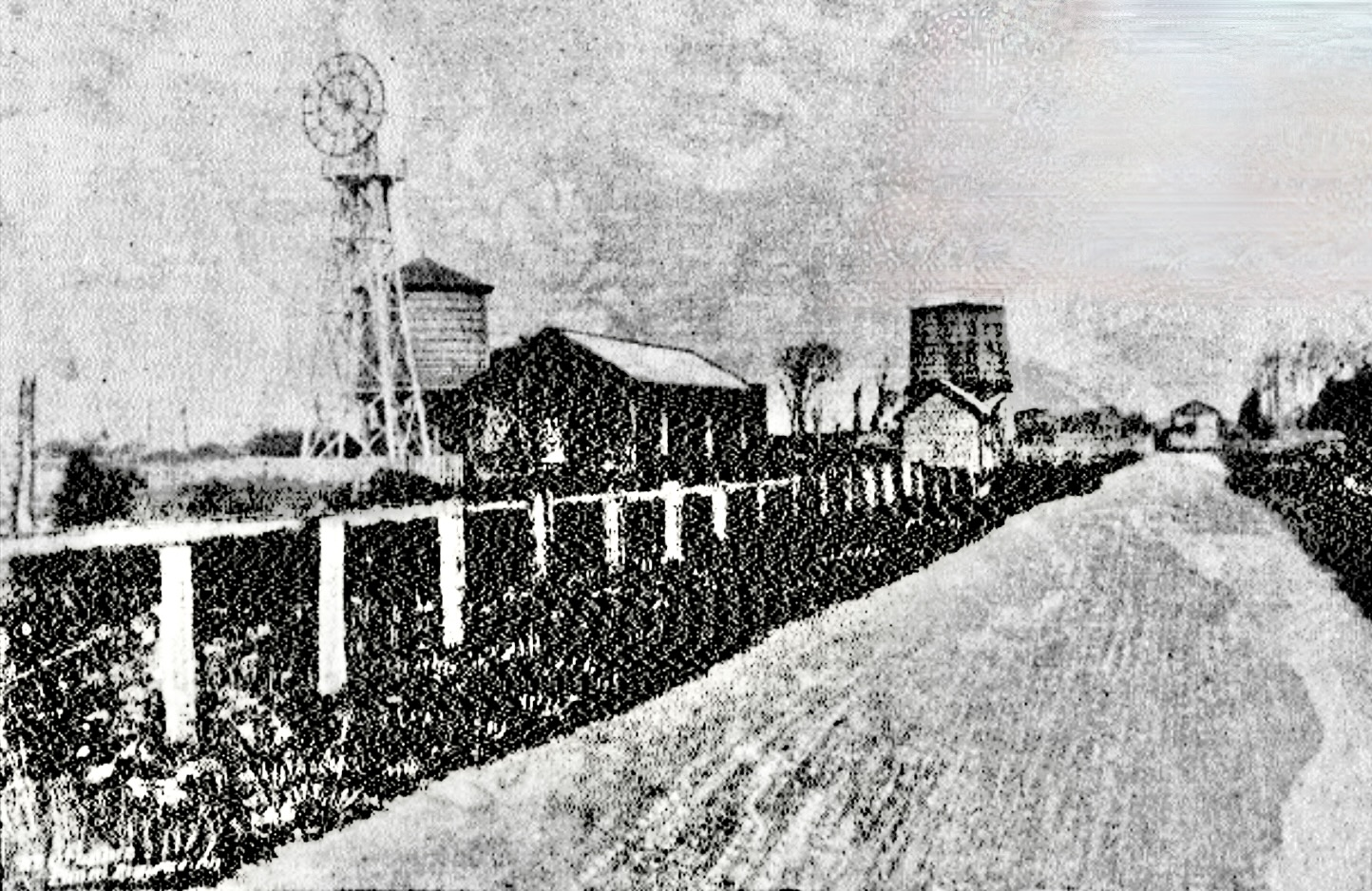
Kereru in 1893

Kereru was opened as a flag station by the Wellington and Manawatu Railway Company on Monday 2 August 1886, when trains started to run between Longburn and Ōtaki, though a special train had run from Longburn to Ohau in April 1886. The first through train from Wellington to Palmerston North ran on 30 November 1886.

Water for locomotives was supplied by an 80 ft (24 m) high windmill and 6.000 and 20,000 gallon tanks. In 1906 the cattle yards were rebuilt and a new goods shed and sheep stage added. When New Zealand Railways Department took over in 1908, tablet signalling was introduced. Further improvements were made in 1909, so that by 1911 there was a shelter shed, platform, cart approach, 42 ft (13 m) by 13 ft (4.0 m) and 18 ft (5.5 m) by 12 ft (3.7 m) goods sheds, loading bank, cattle and sheep yards and a passing loop for 70 wagons (extended to 90 wagons in the 1940s). From 1889 to 1915 there was a Post Office at the station, operated by a ganger. A post office was also mentioned in 1926. A railway house was built in 1927.

Old buildings were removed in 1968. By 1981 Koputaroa had no outward traffic and the only inward freight was fertiliser to a bulk store; in 1905 Manawatu Gorge Lime Co Ltd had applied for a private siding. In 1990 a small shed remained on the west side of the line.

== Incidents ==
On 24 June 1910 a U^{D} class locomotive and 3 coaches of the New Plymouth mail train were derailed, though, as the train was travelling slowly, there were no injuries. It took all weekend to clear the line and a diversionary track was laid to allow trains to pass. Incorrectly set points at the passing loop were thought to have caused the Incident.
