= New Zealand BEMU class electric multiple unit =

Type of battery-electric trainsets being manufactured for Metlink Wellington

- Stock type: Battery electric multiple unit
- In service: 2030 (planned)
- Manufacturer: Alstom
- Built at: Savli, Gujarat, India
- Replaced: Diesel-hauled trains: Mark 2 carriages DFT class loco
- Lines served: Capital Connection; Wairarapa Line

Specifications
- Electric systems: 1,500 V DC (nominal) from overhead catenary
- Current collection: Pantograph
- Track gauge: 1,067 mm (3 ft 6 in)

The New Zealand BEMU class "Tūhono" of 18 battery electric multiple units is a type of passenger train on order for Metlink in Wellington, New Zealand.

== Background ==
The Tūhono BEMU battery-electric multiple unit trains were ordered in September 2025 to replace the diesel-hauled Capital Connection and the Wairarapa Connection trains for the lower North Island for services from Wellington railway station to Palmerston North and Masterton. Three companies had been short-listed for tenders: Alstom (France), Construcciones y Auxiliar de Ferrocarriles (CAF; Spain) and Stadler Rail (Switzerland).

They are to be designed, built in India and operated by Alstom in a 35-year contract valued at NZ$1,065 million (€ 538 million), which will be the first design, build and operate contract for Alstom in New Zealand or Australia. The new trains are due to arrive in 2029 and enter service in 2030.

The Wairarapa Line to the Masterton railway station is 91 km including 58.5 km non-electrified. The non-electrified section from the Upper Hutt railway station includes gradients up to the Remutaka Tunnel on both sides and the gradient in the tunnel.

The Manawatū section of the North Island Main Trunk to the Palmerston North railway station is 135 km including 81 km non-electrified. The non-electrified section from the Waikanae railway station is flat.

== Design ==
The trains are based on Alstom's Adessia Stream B trains, but for the narrow Cape gauge and with front evacuation doors in the control car at each end (required in tunnels).

The train will be 80m long with 5 cars, or shorter than a two-consist Matangi train. It will use Jacobs bogies with all but the bogies on the control cars at each end powered. A train will have two pantographs, which will both be extended for fast charging at terminals, but only one will be extended when in motion.

They will be similar to the Irish DART trains (IÉ 90000 Class) from Dublin to Drogheda. Their introduction had been delayed to 2027 due to battery issues.

== Funding and ownership ==
The trains will be purchased by the Greater Wellington Regional Council.

The government will fund 90% of the cost or $800.2m; $455.3m from Crown funding and $347.5m from the National Land Transport Fund. The rest will be funded by the Horizons Regional Council and the Greater Wellington Regional Council.

They will operate from the existing 1,500 V DC overhead lines to Waikanae and Upper Hutt, then to Palmerston North and Wairarapa will be battery powered. They will have charging points at Masterton and Palmerston North where they can be rapid charged in under 20 minutes (day, for return trip) or slow charged overnight. Alstom will have a maintenance depot at Masterton Railway Station, to have a staff of thirty and a three-track maintenance centre.

They will have wheelchair, cycle and pram facilities plus water dispensers and vending machines. As a full trip will take over an hour they will include an accessible passenger toilet and a standard passenger toilet, unlike the Matangi trains which have neither.

They will be the first Battery Electric Multiple Unit in New Zealand, although similar BEMUs operate in Europe (Croatia, France, Germany, Latvia, United Kingdom etc) and Japan.

The Greater Wellington Regional Council who are purchasing them said they will have a maximum speed of 120 km/h, and the number of peak-time trips will be at least doubled. Station platform upgrades will be needed at Carterton, Shannon and Solway railway stations, and building upgrades at Levin and Ōtaki railway stations, a new signalling system Upper Hutt to Masterton plus additional passing loops at Maymorn and Woodside and upgrading or removal of road level crossings; see "Future Rail". Metlink. 2025.

On the Wairarapa Line, four level crossings have been closed and twenty-five level crossings and the signalling system have been upgraded.

In November 2025 Fiona Abbott of KiwiRail said that some level crossing upgrades would be required on the Wellington–Manawatu line by Waka Kotahi-NZTA for the new trains. KiwiRail has already completed safety crossings for 21 of the 30 level crossings on the Wairarapa Line.

Replacement of the existing trains which use 50-year–old carriages (the New Zealand British Rail Mark 2 carriage) has been proposed for several years; although earlier proposals by the Greater Wellington Regional Council were for diesel plus battery hybrids. The previous minister Simeon Brown had asked for the hybrid diesel/battery option to be considered.

== Lithium-ion batteries ==
Lithium-ion rechargeable batteries are widely used in rail and road vehicles; eg the BEMU version of the British Rail Class 777 made by Stadler Rail. They have lithium-titanite batteries, for which Stadler claim a lifespan of 8 years or 10,000 charge/discharge cycles.

== See also ==
- Public transport in the Wellington Region#Replacement of diesel-hauled trains
- Locomotives of New Zealand
