= Hadfield railway station, New Zealand =

Defunct railway station in New Zealand

Hadfield railway station

General information
- Location: New Zealand
- Coordinates: 40.840082°S 175.087467°E
- Elevation: 40 ft (12 m)
- Line: North Island Main Trunk
- Distance: Wellington 40 mi (64 km)

History
- Opened: 1 December 1886
- Closed: 15 January 1906

Services
| Preceding station | Historical railways | Following station |
|---|---|---|
| Te Horo; Line open, station closed 3 mi (4.8 km) | North Island Main Trunk; KiwiRail | Waikanae; Line open, station open 3 mi (4.8 km) |
Location

Hadfield railway station was a flag station, sometimes shown as Hatfield, on the North Island Main Trunk and in the Kāpiti Coast District of New Zealand.

It opened on 1 December 1886 and closed on 15 January 1906. The only siding was a loop with capacity for 28 wagons and locomotive. It had a "waiting shed" and was probably named after the nearby Te Kowhai or Hadfield's Creek.

The Wellington-Manawatu Line was opened by the Wellington and Manawatu Railway Company (WMR) when the first through train from Wellington to Palmerston North ran on 30 November 1886. Hadfield was part of the Waikanae to Ōtaki contract, let to Messrs Wilkie and Wilson.

Only a single track now passes through the station site.
