= Manakau railway station =

Defunct railway station in New Zealand

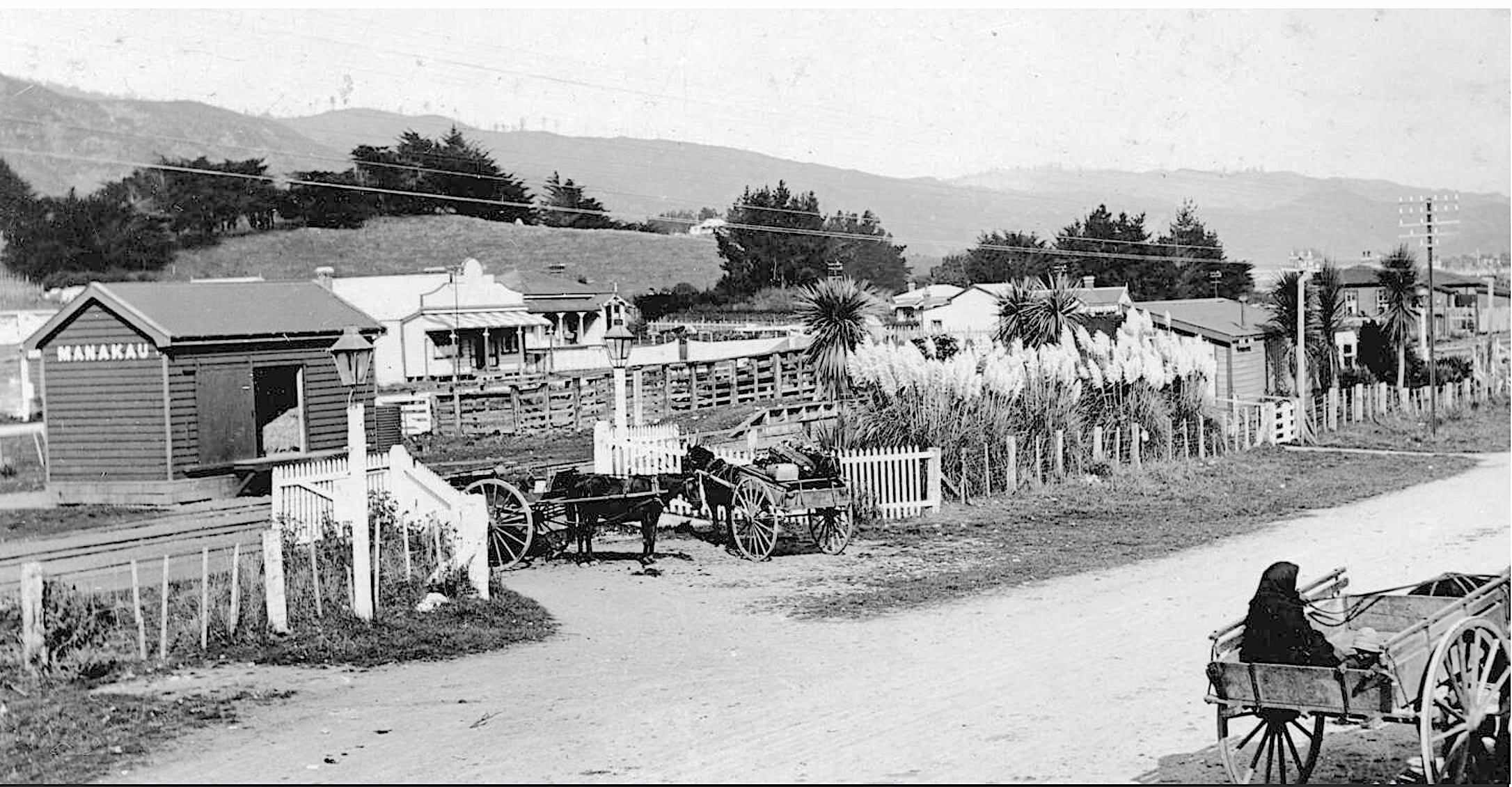
- Manakau station in 1910

General information
- Location: New Zealand
- Coordinates: 40.715172°S 175.21602°E
- Elevation: 30 m (98 ft)
- Line: North Island Main Trunk
- Distance: Wellington 79.39 km (49.33 mi)

History
- Opened: 2 August 1886
- Closed: passengers by December 1975 goods 4 April 1982
- Former names: Manukau

Services
Preceding station	Historical railways	Following station
Ōhau; Line open, station closed 5.94 km (3.69 mi)	North Island Main Trunk; KiwiRail	Ōtaki; Line open, station open 8.9 km (5.5 mi)
Location

Manakau railway station was a station at Manakau in Horowhenua District on the Wellington–Manawatu section of the North Island Main Trunk in the Manawatū-Whanganui region of New Zealand. The station was sometimes known as Manukau and officially changed to Manakau on 28 February 1900. It opened in 1886 and closed in 1982. A shed, a hut and a passing loop remain at the site of the station.

== History ==
Fergus and Blair of Dunedin had the contract for building the Manakau to Ōtaki section. Manakau was opened as a flag station by the Wellington and Manawatu Railway Company on Monday 2 August 1886, when trains started to run between Longburn and Ōtaki. The first through train from Wellington to Palmerston North ran on 30 November 1886.

In 1902 a new goods shed was built. When New Zealand Railways Department took over in 1908, tablet signalling was introduced. Further improvements were made in 1909, so that by 1911 there was a shelter shed, platform, cart approach, 25 ft (7.6 m) by 13 ft (4.0 m) goods shed, loading bank, cattle and sheep yards and a passing loop for 51 wagons (extended to 90 wagons in the 1940s). A railway house was extended in 1900 and others built in 1918, 1926 and 1941. A nearby level crossing on SH1 was replaced by a bridge in 1938. Some curves on the line to Ōtaki were eased in the late 1930s.

From 20 October 1967 staff were withdrawn and Manakau became an unattended flag station. In 1973 tenders were called for removal of the station building. By 1981 Manakau was handling fertiliser and lime at a private siding and little else. On 4 April 1982 it closed to all except private siding traffic.
