= Manakau =

Settlement in Manawatū-Whanganui, New Zealand

- Interactive map of Manakau
- Coordinates: 40.714°S 175.216°E
- Country: New Zealand
- Region: Manawatū-Whanganui
- Territorial authority: Horowhenua
- Ward: Waiopehu General Ward; Horowhenua Māori Ward
- Electorates: Rangitīkei (electorate); Te Tai Hauāuru (Māori)

Government
  - Territorial Authority: Horowhenua District Council
  - Regional council: Horizons Regional Council
  - Horowhenua Mayor: Bernie Wanden
  - Rangitīkei MP: Suze Redmayne
  - Te Tai Hauāuru MP: Debbie Ngarewa-Packer

Area
  - Total: 5.66 km^{2} (2.19 sq mi)

Population (June 2025)
  - Total: 490
  - Density: 87/km^{2} (220/sq mi)
- Time zone: UTC+12 (NZST)
  - Summer (DST): UTC+13 (NZDT)
- Postcode: 5573
- Area code: 06

Manakau is a settlement situated in the Horowhenua District, located at the boundary of the Manawatū-Whanganui and Wellington regions of New Zealand's North Island. It lies 8 km north of Ōtaki and 12 km south of Levin, and is connected to both via State Highway 1, which skirts Manakau's western edge. The township is situated 5 km inland from the coast of the Tasman Sea.

In 1886, Manakau became the first place to have a railway station on the newly completed Wellington-Manawatu railway line. Although the line is now part of the North Island Main Trunk line, but the station itself has long been closed. Industries in the area include horticulture, and there are several plant nurseries in or close to the township.

The name Manakau comes from the Māori words mana (prestige, authority) and kau (alone, sole). The name refers to an invasion of the district by notable tribal leader Te Rauparaha, who subdued the area on the strength of his prestige alone, with the local residents putting up no resistance. The streets are named after Māori members of Parliament.

== Marae ==
Manakau has two marae, affiliated with local hapū from the Ngāti Raukawa iwi. Tūkorehe Marae and its meeting house of the same name are affiliated with the hapū of Ngāti Tūkorehe; Wehi Wehi Marae and its meeting house of the same name are affiliated with the hapū of Ngāti Wehi Wehi.

In October 2020, the Government committed $482,108 from the Provincial Growth Fund to Ngāti Tūkorehe to upgrade its Tūkorehe Marae, creating 17.5 positions.

== Demographics ==
Manakau is described by Stats NZ as a rural settlement, and covers 5.66 km^{2} (2.19 sq mi). It had an estimated population of 490 as of June 2025, with a population density of 87 people per km^{2}. It is part of the larger Ōhau-Manakau statistical area.

Historical population
Year	Pop.	±% p.a.
2006	342	—
2013	333	−0.38%
2018	420	+4.75%
2023	480	+2.71%

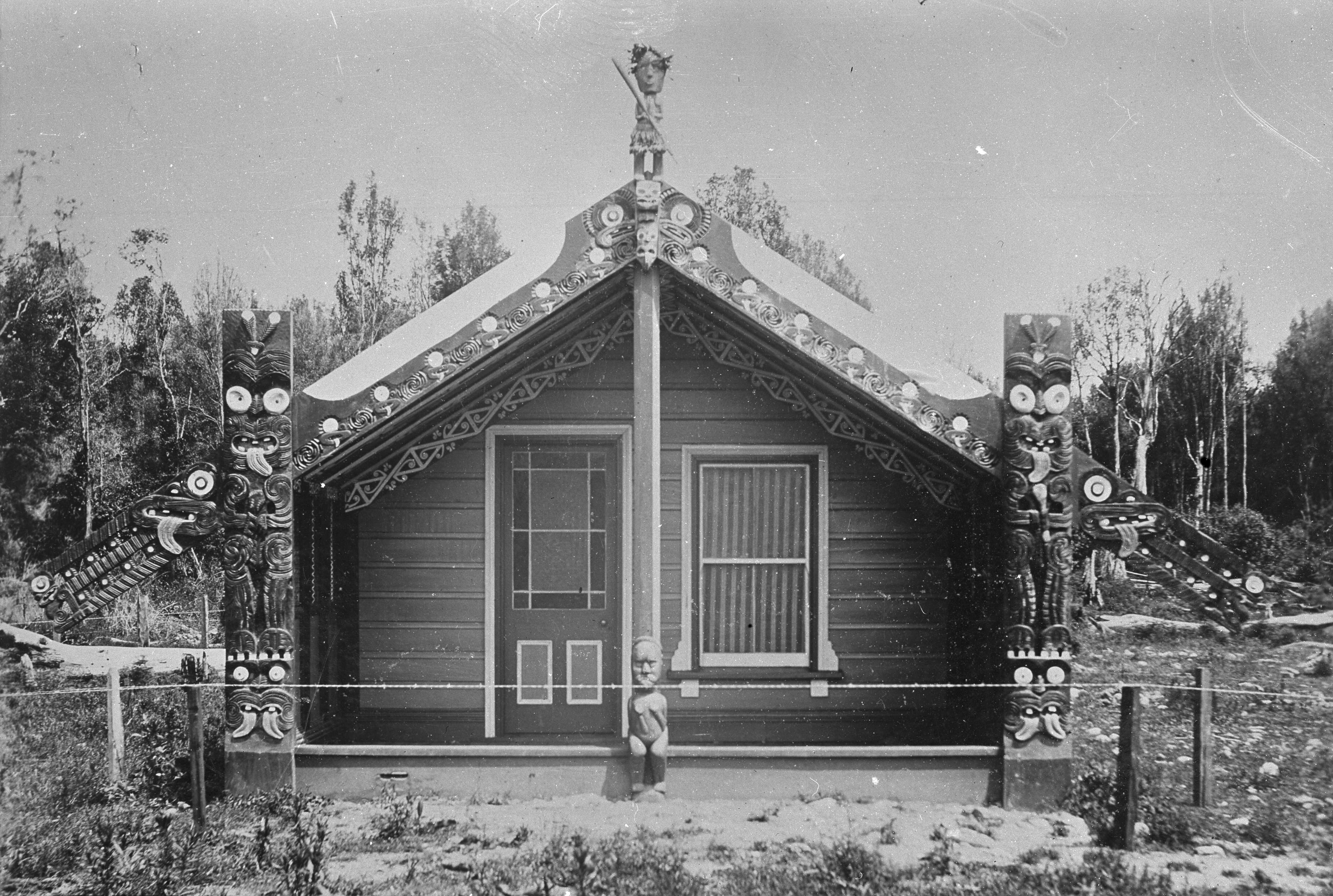
House of Te Ua Whaka, at Manakau, 1880s

Manakau had a population of 480 in the 2023 New Zealand census, an increase of 60 people (14.3%) since the 2018 census, and an increase of 147 people (44.1%) since the 2013 census. There were 234 males and 246 females in 192 dwellings. 3.1% of people identified as LGBTIQ+. The median age was 52.5 years (compared with 38.1 years nationally). There were 75 people (15.6%) aged under 15 years, 51 (10.6%) aged 15 to 29, 225 (46.9%) aged 30 to 64, and 135 (28.1%) aged 65 or older.

People could identify as more than one ethnicity. The results were 86.2% European (Pākehā); 20.0% Māori; 3.1% Pasifika; 3.1% Asian; 0.6% Middle Eastern, Latin American and African New Zealanders (MELAA); and 5.0% other, which includes people giving their ethnicity as "New Zealander". English was spoken by 99.4%, Māori by 5.0%, and other languages by 7.5%. The percentage of people born overseas was 15.6, compared with 28.8% nationally.

Religious affiliations were 31.2% Christian, 0.6% Hindu, 0.6% Māori religious beliefs, 0.6% Buddhist, and 2.5% New Age. People who answered that they had no religion were 56.2%, and 8.1% of people did not answer the census question.

Of those at least 15 years old, 81 (20.0%) people had a bachelor's or higher degree, 225 (55.6%) had a post-high school certificate or diploma, and 102 (25.2%) people exclusively held high school qualifications. The median income was $35,000, compared with $41,500 nationally. 42 people (10.4%) earned over $100,000 compared to 12.1% nationally. The employment status of those at least 15 was 195 (48.1%) full-time, 75 (18.5%) part-time, and 6 (1.5%) unemployed.

== Education ==
Manakau School is a co-educational state primary school for Year 1 to 8 students, with a roll of 98 as of July 2026. The school was founded in 1888.

== Notable people ==
- Thomas Bevan (1836–1913), farmer and author.
