= Hautere railway station =

Defunct railway station in New Zealand

General information
- Location: New Zealand
- Coordinates: 40.783644°S 175.136327°E
- Elevation: 30 m (98 ft)
- Line: North Island Main Trunk
- Distance: Wellington 67.6 km (42.0 mi)

History
- Opened: by 1887
- Closed: 3 February 1900

Services
Preceding station	Historical railways	Following station
Ōtaki; Line open, station open 2.68 km (1.67 mi)	North Island Main Trunk; KiwiRail	Te Horo; Line open, station closed 2.83 km (1.76 mi)
Location

Hautere railway station was a flag station on the North Island Main Trunk in New Zealand.

The Wellington-Manawatu Line was opened by the Wellington and Manawatu Railway Company (WMR) when the first through train from Wellington to Palmerston North ran on 30 November 1886. Hautere was part of the Waikanae to Ōtaki contract, let to Messrs Wilkie and Wilson. The station wasn't in the February 1887 timetable, but had opened by December 1887, when WMR was selling nearby land and was in an 1888 timetable. By 1895 it was only a siding for goods traffic, with a sawmill. On 3 February 1900 it was reported as closed.

Only a single track now passes through the station site.
