= Ōhau River (Manawatū-Whanganui) =

River in Manawatū-Whanganui Region, New Zealand

- The Ōhau River near the river mouth
- Route of the Ōhau River
- Mouth of the Ōhau River Ōhau River (Manawatū-Whanganui) (North Island)
- Native name: Te Awa o Ōhau (Māori)

Location
- Country: New Zealand
- Island: North Island
- Region: Manawatū-Whanganui
- District: Horowhenua

Physical characteristics
- Source: North Ōhau River
  - location: Tawirikohukohu, Tararua Range
  - coordinates: 40.67501°S 175.42205°E
- 2nd source: South Ōhau River
  - location: Tararua Range
  - coordinates: 40.67501°S 175.42205°E
- Mouth: South Taranaki Bight
  - location: Kuku Beach
  - coordinates: 40°39′22″S 175°09′23″E
  - elevation: Sea level
- Length: 39 km (24 mi)
- Basin size: 18,800 ha (46,000 acres)

Basin features
- Progression: Ōhau River → Kuku Ōhau Estuary → South Taranaki Bight → Tasman Sea
- Cities: Ōhau, Kuku
- Tributaries
  - left: Butchers Creek (South Ōhau River), Blackwater Stream, Makorokio Stream, Kuku Stream
  - right: Makahika Stream
- Waterbodies: Ōhau Gorge, Ōhau Loop
- Waterfalls: Dowling Falls (South Ōhau River)
- Bridges: Poads Road bridge, Kirkcaldies Bridge (Muhunoa East Road), Ōhau River Rail Bridge (North Island Main Trunk), Ōhau River Bridge (State Highway 1)

The Ōhau River is in the Horowhenua District of New Zealand's North Island. It flows from the confluence of two short rivers, the North Ōhau River and the South Ōhau River. The Ōhau initially flows north, turning west to the southeast of Levin. It reaches the Tasman Sea 10 kilometres (6 mi) southwest of Levin.

== Etymology ==
The river's name refers to Haunui-a-Nanaia, a Māori ancestor who lived in the 14th century who was responsible for naming many locations in the lower North Island.

== Geography ==
The river originates in the Tararua Range, and has two upper sections: the North Ōhau River which rises from Tawirikohukohu, and the South Ōhau River which rises between the Dora Ridge and the main Tararua Range. A waterfall called the Dowling Falls is located on the South Ōhau River, and a steep valley called the Ōhau Gorge is located in the lower foothills of the Tararua Range which the river flows through. While the upper section of the river flow through the Tararua Forest Park, the majority of the 18,800 ha (46,000 acres) catchment is open farmland.

The river opens to form the Kuku Ōhau estuary, located at Kuku Beach, with the lower 3 km (1.9 mi) of the river having estuarine water. The river mouth is dynamic, can move over 100 m (330 ft) in a single year. Between 1842 and 1870 the river mouth was located significantly further to the south, enough that the Waikawa Stream had been a tributary of the river during this time. The estuary is surrounded by approximately 10 ha (25 acres) of salt marshes. Much of the lower estuarine margins is land owned by Ngāti Raukawa.

The Ōhau Loop is an oxbow lake found to the south of the lower river, which was previously a part of the river course.

Ōhau, a small town and the rural locality Kuku are located near the river.

== Biodiversity ==
Estuarine margins dominated by Juncus kraussii and Goodenia radicans, with notable areas of Plagianthus divaricatus, and Apodasmia similis on the southern bank. The estuary and surrounding salt marsh is an important area for migratory and shore birds, including Bar-tailed godwits, Caspian terns, wrybills and Variable oystercatchers. Native fish species found in the estuary include New Zealand longfin eels, shortjaw kōkopu, Climbing galaxias, Common galaxias, Redfin bullies, Bluegill bullies, torrentfish and Pouched lampreys.

== History ==
The Ōhau River has traditional significance to Māori, notably Ngāti Raukawa who are the mana whenua of the river area. The river is a traditional food source, and archaeological sites including pā and papakāinga can be found along the river's shores. Legends of the Ōhau River involve guardian taniwha, one that took the form of inverted logs that indicated good places to harvest seafood, and another in the form of an eel that lived in the sand dunes, wailing during times of dangers. One taniwha is associated with a bend of the river called "the Deep", and others took forms including flounders and crayfish.

In the 1970s flood protection works were undertaken along the course of the river. This led to a section of the river, now known as the Ōhau Loop, being cut off and forming an oxbow lake. Since 2000, Ngāti Raukawa and Ngāti Tukorehe, who own land surrounding the lake, have worked to reintegrate the lake into the wider river system, after noticing the degradation of the Ōhau River system.

== Recreation ==
The estuary is used by whitebaiters, duck shooters and surfcasting fishers. Gladstone Reserve is located along the course of the river, and is a site popular for picnics, bush walks and swimming in the river. Kimberley Reserve is located further west along the stream, which is the location of a recreational campground.

In the Tararua Forest Park, the Northern Crossing follows a section of the Ōhau River. South Ohau Hut is a 10-bunk hut located at the confluence of Butchers Creek and the South Ōhau River, accessible from the Yeates Track.

== Gallery ==
Australian pied cormorants (kāruhiruhi) on the Kuku Ōhau estuary

South Ohau Hut
