= Te Horo railway station =

Defunct railway station in New Zealand

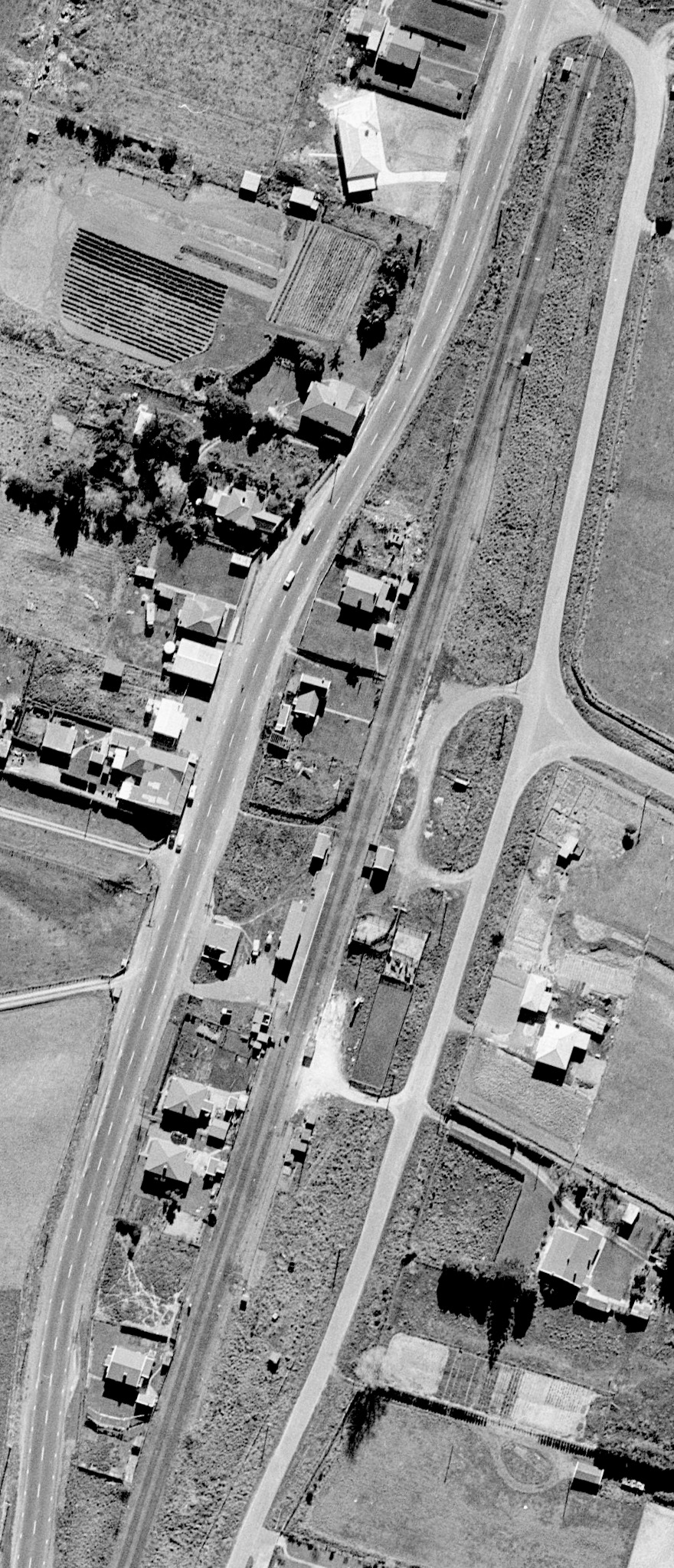
- Te Horo in 1961

General information
- Location: New Zealand
- Coordinates: 40.80426°S 175.119887°E
- Elevation: 19 m (62 ft)
- Line: North Island Main Trunk
- Distance: Wellington 64.73 km (40.22 mi)

History
- Opened: 1 December 1886
- Closed: 21 February 1971

Services
Preceding station	Historical railways	Following station
Hautere; Line open, station closed 2.83 km (1.76 mi)	North Island Main Trunk; KiwiRail	Hadfield; Line open, station closed 4.77 km (2.96 mi)
Location

Te Horo railway station was a flag station at Te Horo, in the Kāpiti Coast District on the North Island Main Trunk in New Zealand. It was served by diesel shuttles between Te Horo and Wellington. Only equipment sheds and a passing loop now remain at the station site.

== History ==
The Wellington-Manawatu Line was opened by the Wellington and Manawatu Railway Company (WMR) when the first through train from Wellington to Palmerston North ran on 30 November 1886. Te Horo was part of the Waikanae to Ōtaki contract, let to Messrs Wilkie and Wilson. The station was in the 1 December 1886 timetable and was advertised in 1887, when WMR was selling nearby land

There was a Post Office at the station, run by a ganger from 1892 to 1910. A goods shed was built in 1893 and cattle yards extended in 1901, when a sheep loading race and platform were added. When New Zealand Railways Department took over in 1908, tablet signalling was introduced. The station was improved in 1909 and a goods shed added in 1910, so that by 1911 it had a shelter shed, platform (129 ft (39 m) long and 10 in (25 cm) high in 1936), cart approach, 18 ft (5.5 m) by 12 ft (3.7 m) goods shed, loading bank, cattle and sheep yards and a passing loop for 43 wagons (extended later that year to 66 wagons, in 1940 to 90 wagons and in 1951 to 100 wagons). A new cattle loading race opened on 5 October 1960.

The station burnt down on 4 November 1923. It was rebuilt in 1924 in the style of a type B Troup station, with a lobby, ladies' waiting room and tablet porter's office. The new station was a 37 ft (11 m) lean-to, built of mataī, with kauri benches in the waiting room.

Railway houses were built in 1892 (2), 1893 (2), 1918, 1928 and 1951.

Water tanks at Te Horo were removed in 1959 and Te Horo became an unattended crossing station from 19 May 1962. In 1965 the goods shed was in a poor condition and only small packages arrived by lorry. The stockyards closed on 27 February 1966 and were removed in 1967. On 21 February 1971 Te Horo closed to all traffic. On 10 November 1971 the 1924 station building was sold to a local potter, Mirek Smišek, who moved it to his garden. It is on Kāpiti Coast Council's list of heritage buildings at 990 State Highway 1.

=== Tramway ===
In 1902 it was reported that WMR had sold over 1,200 acres (490 ha) of rimu bush and that a sawmill and tramline to Te Horo station would open in about 6 weeks. In 1903 Campbell Land & Timber Co got permission for a tramway along Mangaone and Te Horo Roads. It ran for about 8 km (5.0 mi) east from the station. About 1906 Campbell Timber Co proposed a siding. They sold the area in 1908. The tramway was disused by 1929.

== Possible reopening ==
During the 2017 general election, the Green Party proposed extending electrification to Ōtaki as an alternative to the Northern Corridor extension from Peka Peka. The National Party also supported electrification, "to allow people living in Manakau, Ōtaki and Te Horo to easily travel to Wellington".
