= Koputaroa =

Settlement in the Horowhenua District, New Zealand

- Rural locality
- Interactive map of Koputaroa
- Coordinates: 40.578°S 175.338°E
- Country: New Zealand
- Region: Manawatū-Whanganui region
- Territorial authority: Horowhenua District
- Wards: Waiopehu General Ward; Horowhenua Māori Ward
- Electorates: Rangitīkei (electorate); Te Tai Hauāuru (Māori)

Government
  - Territorial Authority: Horowhenua District Council
  - Regional council: Horizons Regional Council
  - Horowhenua Mayor: Bernie Wanden
  - Rangitīkei MP: Suze Redmayne
  - Te Tai Hauāuru MP: Debbie Ngarewa-Packer

Area
  - Total: 118.76 km^{2} (45.85 sq mi)

Population (2023 Census)
  - Total: 858
  - Density: 7.22/km^{2} (18.7/sq mi)
- Postal code: 5575
- Area code: 06

Koputaroa, Koputāroa or Kōputaroa is a rural community in the Horowhenua District and Manawatū-Whanganui region of New Zealand's North Island.

It is located south of Shannon and north of Levin on State Highway 57. It had a railway station from 1886 to 1986.

The New Zealand Ministry for Culture and Heritage gives a translation of "long snare for catching parakeets" for Kōputaroa.

== Demographics ==
Koputaroa locality covers 118.76 km^{2} (45.85 sq mi), and includes Poroutawhao. It is split between the Makahika, Kere Kere and Waitārere statistical areas.

Historical population
Year	Pop.	±% p.a.
2006	705	—
2013	690	−0.31%
2018	768	+2.17%
2023	858	+2.24%
The 2006 population is for a larger area of 122.45 km^{2}. Source:

Koputaroa had a population of 858 in the 2023 New Zealand census, an increase of 90 people (11.7%) since the 2018 census, and an increase of 168 people (24.3%) since the 2013 census. There were 432 males and 432 females in 324 dwellings. 1.7% of people identified as LGBTIQ+. There were 168 people (19.6%) aged under 15 years, 126 (14.7%) aged 15 to 29, 423 (49.3%) aged 30 to 64, and 144 (16.8%) aged 65 or older.

People could identify as more than one ethnicity. The results were 88.1% European (Pākehā), 20.3% Māori, 4.2% Pasifika, 5.2% Asian, and 3.5% other, which includes people giving their ethnicity as "New Zealander". English was spoken by 97.2%, Māori by 3.8%, and other languages by 5.9%. No language could be spoken by 1.7% (e.g. too young to talk). New Zealand Sign Language was known by 0.3%. The percentage of people born overseas was 14.0, compared with 28.8% nationally.

Religious affiliations were 28.7% Christian, 0.3% Hindu, 0.7% Islam, 0.7% Māori religious beliefs, 0.3% Buddhist, 1.0% New Age, and 0.7% other religions. People who answered that they had no religion were 59.1%, and 9.4% of people did not answer the census question.

Of those at least 15 years old, 129 (18.7%) people had a bachelor's or higher degree, 405 (58.7%) had a post-high school certificate or diploma, and 162 (23.5%) people exclusively held high school qualifications. 78 people (11.3%) earned over $100,000 compared to 12.1% nationally. The employment status of those at least 15 was 369 (53.5%) full-time, 114 (16.5%) part-time, and 6 (0.9%) unemployed.

== Marae ==
The local Kererū Marae and Mahinārangi meeting house are a meeting place of the Ngāti Raukawa hapū of Ngāti Takihiku and Ngāti Ngārongo.

In October 2020, the Government committed $335,056 from the Provincial Growth Fund to upgrade Kikopiri Marae and Kererū Marae, creating 48 jobs.

== Education ==
Koputaroa School is a co-educational state primary school for Year 1 to 8 students, established in 1891. The school roll is 183 as of July 2026.
