= Ohau railway station =

Defunct railway station in New Zealand

Ōhau railway station
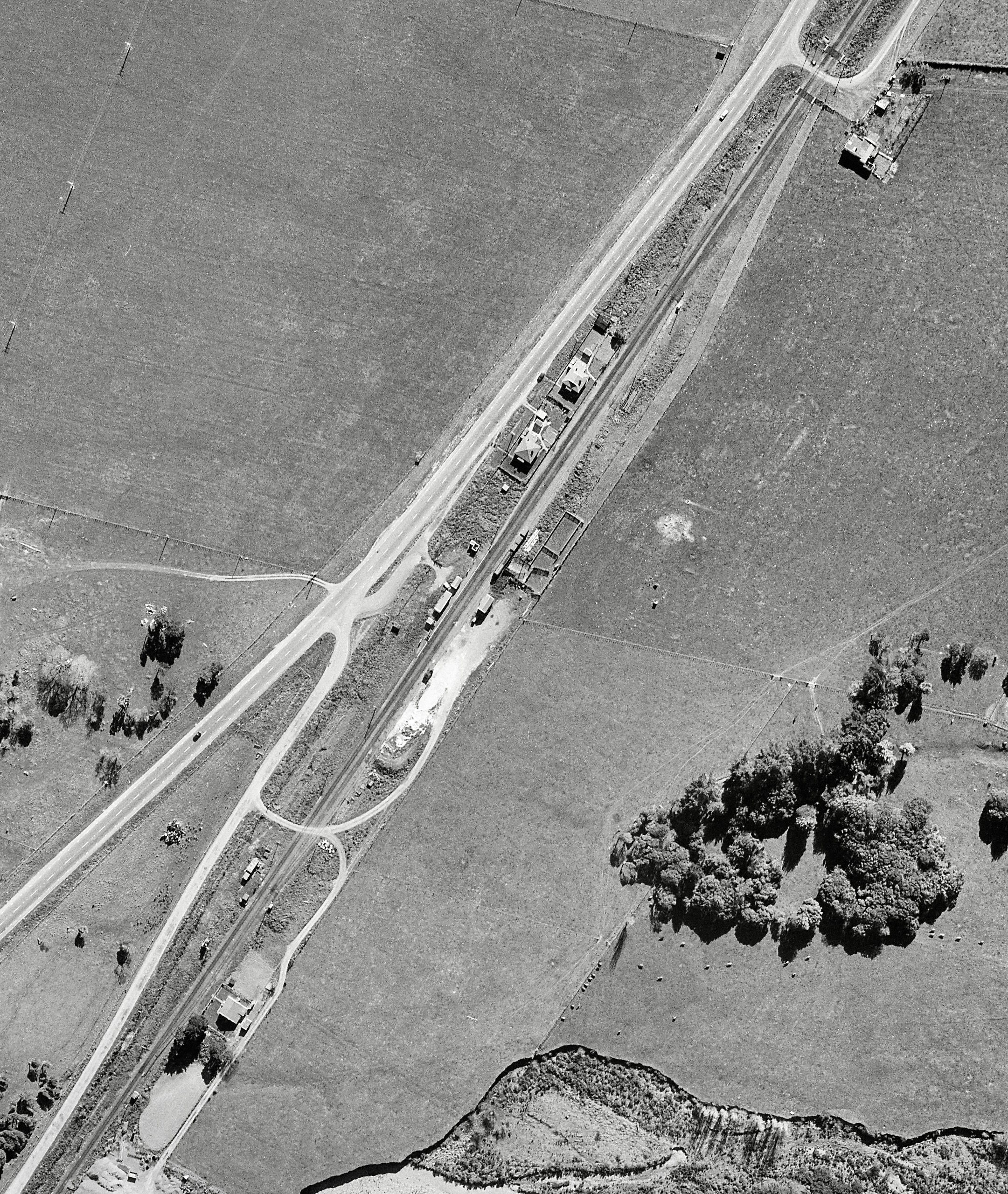
- Ōhau in 1961

General information
- Location: New Zealand
- Coordinates: 40.668482°S 175.245181°E
- Elevation: 31 m (102 ft)
- Line: North Island Main Trunk
- Distance: Wellington 85.33 km (53.02 mi)

History
- Opened: 2 August 1886
- Closed: passengers 21 January 1971 goods 2 November 1987
- Former names: Manukau

Services
Preceding station	Historical railways	Following station
Levin; Line open, station open 4.99 km (3.10 mi)	North Island Main Trunk; KiwiRail	Manakau; Line open, station closed 8.9 km (5.5 mi)
Location

Ōhau railway station was a station at Ōhau on the North Island Main Trunk in the Horowhenua District of New Zealand. It closed on 2 November 1987, though most services had stopped in 1971. Only a 1989 equipment building and a passing loop remain.

== History ==
Ōhau was opened as a flag station by the Wellington and Manawatu Railway Company on Monday 2 August 1886, when trains started to run between Longburn and Ōtaki. A special train ran from Longburn to Ōhau in April 1886. The first through train from Wellington to Palmerston North ran on 30 November 1886.

A goods shed was built in 1893. When New Zealand Railways Department took over in 1908, tablet signalling was introduced. The station was improved in 1909, the platform extended south by 2½ chains and cattle yards built, so that by 1911 it had a shelter shed, platform, cart approach, 25 ft (7.6 m) by 13 ft (4.0 m) goods shed, loading bank, cattle and sheep yards and a passing loop for 56 wagons (extended in 1913 to 70 wagons, in 1940 to 90 wagons and in 1956 to 100 wagons). Electricity was connected in 1930.

Railway houses were built in 1892, 1903, 1921, 1927 (2), 1938 and 1962.

Water supply was an issue from 1901 to 1950. In 1912 it was planned that down express engines would water at Ōhau and in 1913 a new well was sunk and a shed was shifted from Ōtaki for use as a pump house. In 1921 the wind pump blew down and was replaced by a larger 14 ft (4.3 m) windmill. By 1923 AB class engines were able to fill up at Ōhau, but in 1935 vat and windmill were replaced by a small tank. In 1950 the well was deepened and a 600-gallon concrete tank built.

From 1912 to 1956, the repair and length of the platform were also issues, as it was then in very poor condition. By 1934 the timber was decayed. It was shortened from 350 ft (110 m) to 200 ft (61 m) in 1938 using concrete, but in 1939 the broken surface required the efforts of several men to shift a barrow load of milk, thus delaying trains. It was said the barrows then damaged the repaired platform. More repairs were done in 1945 and 1946. In 1956 the platform was again lengthened by 20 yd (18 m), to allow for 10 coaches.

In 1963, a shed south end of station building was knocked down. On Sunday 27 June 1971 Ōhau closed to all traffic. A goods shed, high-level loading bank, low-level loading bank and a lean-to type station building with waiting room and ticket office remained, but the station and goods shed were demolished later that year. Despite closure, it was reported in 1981 that scrap metal was being sent out and fertiliser and lime brought in, presumably to private sidings. On Sunday 31 January 1982 the station was again reported closed, except for Shingle Supplies private siding.

== Ōhau River bridge ==
Just south of the station the NIMT crosses the Ōhau River on a 6-span steel girder bridge, supported on concrete piers.
