= Levin railway station =

Railway station in New Zealand

Levin
- Levin railway station in 2023

General information
- Location: Oxford Street, Levin, New Zealand
- Coordinates: 40.631236°S 175.277804°E
- Elevation: 37 m (121 ft)
- Owner: KiwiRail
- Line: North Island Main Trunk
- Distance: Wellington 90.32 km (56.12 mi)

Construction
- Parking: Yes

History
- Opened: 2 August 1886
- Rebuilt: 1895, 1909
- Former names: Weraroa until 22 April 1894

Services
Preceding station	KiwiRail	Following station
Shannon towards Palmerston North	Capital Connection	Ōtaki towards Wellington

Historic railways
Preceding station	Historical railways	Following station
Queen Street (Levin); Line open, station closed 1.65 km (1.03 mi)	North Island Main Trunk; KiwiRail	Ōhau; Line open, station closed 4.99 km (3.10 mi)
Location

Levin railway station is a station on the North Island Main Trunk serving Levin in the Horowhenua District of New Zealand. It is served by the Capital Connection long-distance commuter train between Wellington and Palmerston North. Prior to the service's cessation in 2012, it was also served by the Overlander long-distance train between Wellington and Auckland.

== History ==
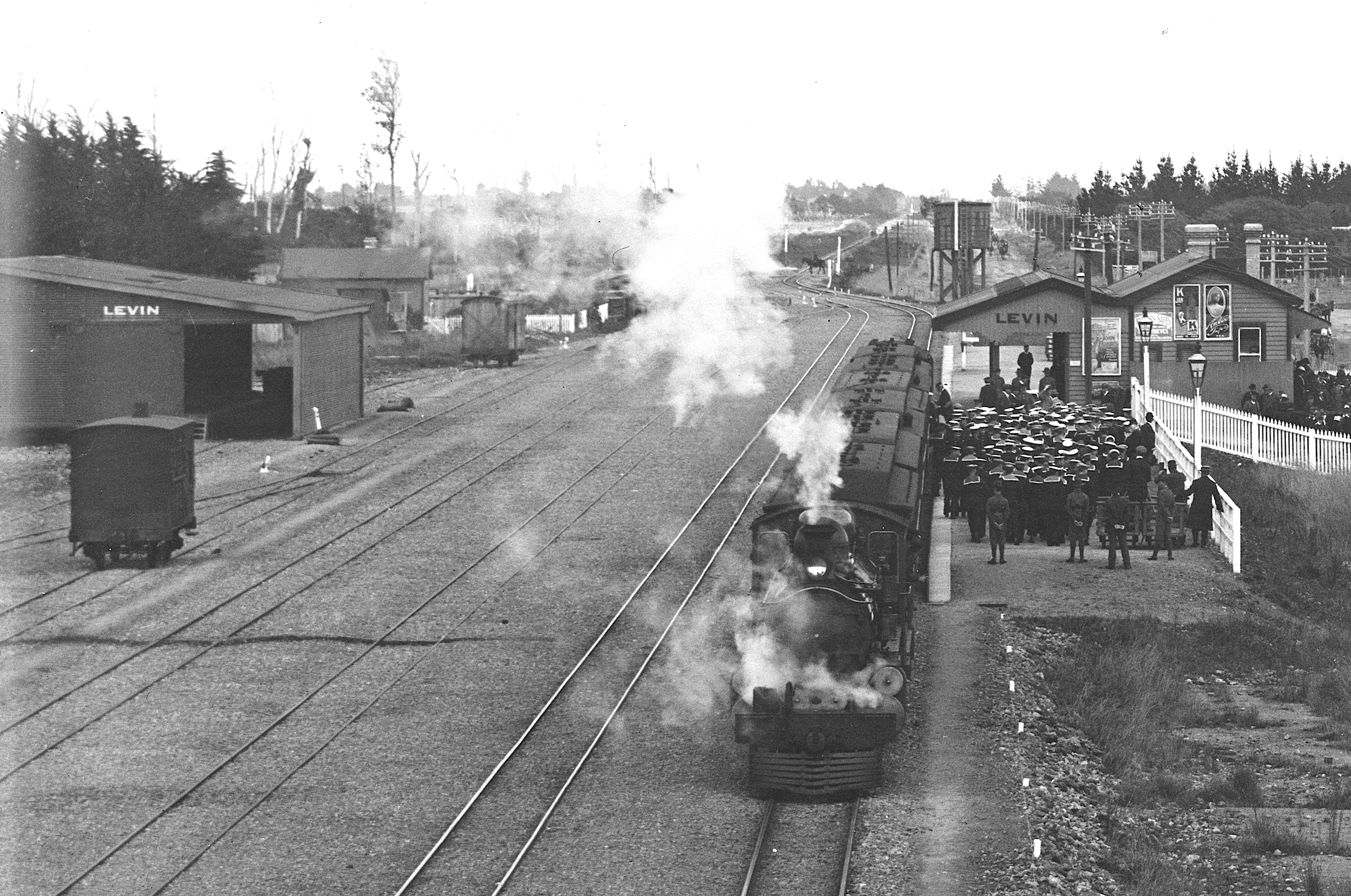
Levin in 1913

The station was opened by the Wellington and Manawatu Railway Company (WMR) in 1886 as an intermediate station on the Wellington-Manawatu Line. The first station was built in the northern part of Levin near Tyne Street, and was replaced in 1894–95 by a station near the centre of Levin. In 1909 this station was destroyed by fire, and replaced by a station 10 chains (200m) south. There was a nearby station in the southern part of Levin at Weraroa from c1886 to 1894.

In 1940 a 61y old married man Mr John Hepburn of Ashburton was killed when he slipped off a carriage platform 300 yards (275m) north of the station on 28 July; he was travelling to Palmerston North to visit his sons after attending his brother's funeral in Wellington.

Two former railway (staff) houses in Levin have Class II listing with Heritage New Zealand, 29 Keepa Street and 31 Keepa Street.
