= Thomas Bevan (author) =

New Zealand author (1836–1913)

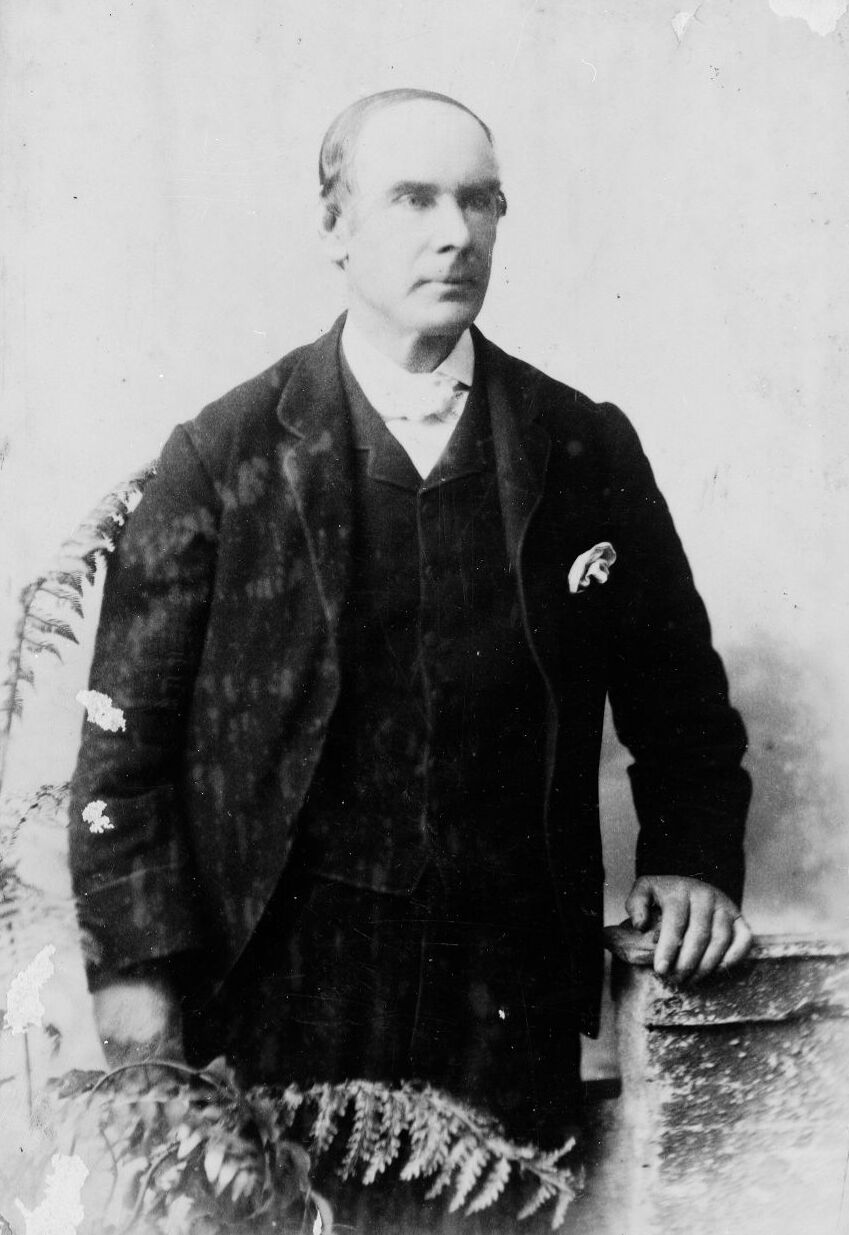
Bevan, c. 1880s

Thomas Bevan (1836 – 21 November 1913) was a British settler, farmer, and author in New Zealand. He is known for his memoir, Reminiscences of an Old Colonist, which recounts the journey he took as a child in 1845, walking from Wellington to Waikawa, north of Ōtaki, alongside his siblings and their guide, Ropina.

== Biography ==
Bevan was born in 1836 in Whitchurch, Shropshire, England. He was the son of Thomas Bevan (1801–1881), a rope maker. In 1841, at the age of five, Bevan emigrated to New Zealand with his father and siblings aboard the ship Lady Nugent.

In 1845, nine-year-old Bevan and his siblings walked from Wellington to Waikawa, led by a Māori guide Ropina also known as Tamihana Whakatupuhina. In his later years, Bevan authored Reminiscences of an Old Colonist (1907).

Bevan married Haana Ransfield in 1858. He died on 21 November 1913 in Ōtaki.
