= Ōhau =

Village in Manawatū-Whanganui

- Rural settlement
- Interactive map of Ōhau
- Coordinates: 40.662°S 175.250°E
- Country: New Zealand
- Region: Manawatū-Whanganui region
- Territorial authority: Horowhenua District
- Wards: Waiopehu General Ward; Horowhenua Māori Ward
- Electorates: Rangitīkei; Te Tai Hauāuru (Māori)

Government
  - Territorial Authority: Horowhenua District Council
  - Regional council: Horizons Regional Council
  - Horowhenua Mayor: Bernie Wanden
  - Rangitīkei MP: Suze Redmayne
  - Te Tai Hauāuru MP: Debbie Ngarewa-Packer

Area
  - Total: 4.47 km^{2} (1.73 sq mi)

Population (June 2025)
  - Total: 810
  - Density: 180/km^{2} (470/sq mi)
- Postal code: 5570

Ōhau is a village and semi-rural community in the Horowhenua District and Manawatū-Whanganui region of New Zealand's North Island. It is located just south of Levin on State Highway 1.

The New Zealand Ministry for Culture and Heritage gives a translation of "place of Hau" for Ōhau, but an alternative meaning could be "windy place".

The former Ohau railway station is located in Ōhau. It operated from 1886 to 1987, with most services ending in 1971.

== Marae ==
The local Kikopiri Marae and Kikopiri meeting house are a tribal meeting ground for the Ngāti Raukawa hapū of Ngāti Hikitanga and Ngāti Kikopiri.

In October 2020, the Government committed $335,056 from the Provincial Growth Fund to upgrade Kikopiri Marae and Kererū Marae, creating 48 jobs.

== Demographics ==
Ōhau is described by Stats NZ as a rural settlement, which covers 4.47 km^{2} (1.73 sq mi). It had an estimated population of 810 as of June 2025, with a population density of 181 people per km^{2}. It is part of the larger Ōhau-Manakau statistical area.

Historical population for Ōhau settlement
Year	Pop.	±% p.a.
2006	438	—
2013	543	+3.12%
2018	651	+3.69%
2023	771	+3.44%
The 2006 population is for a larger area of 6.12 km^{2}. Source:

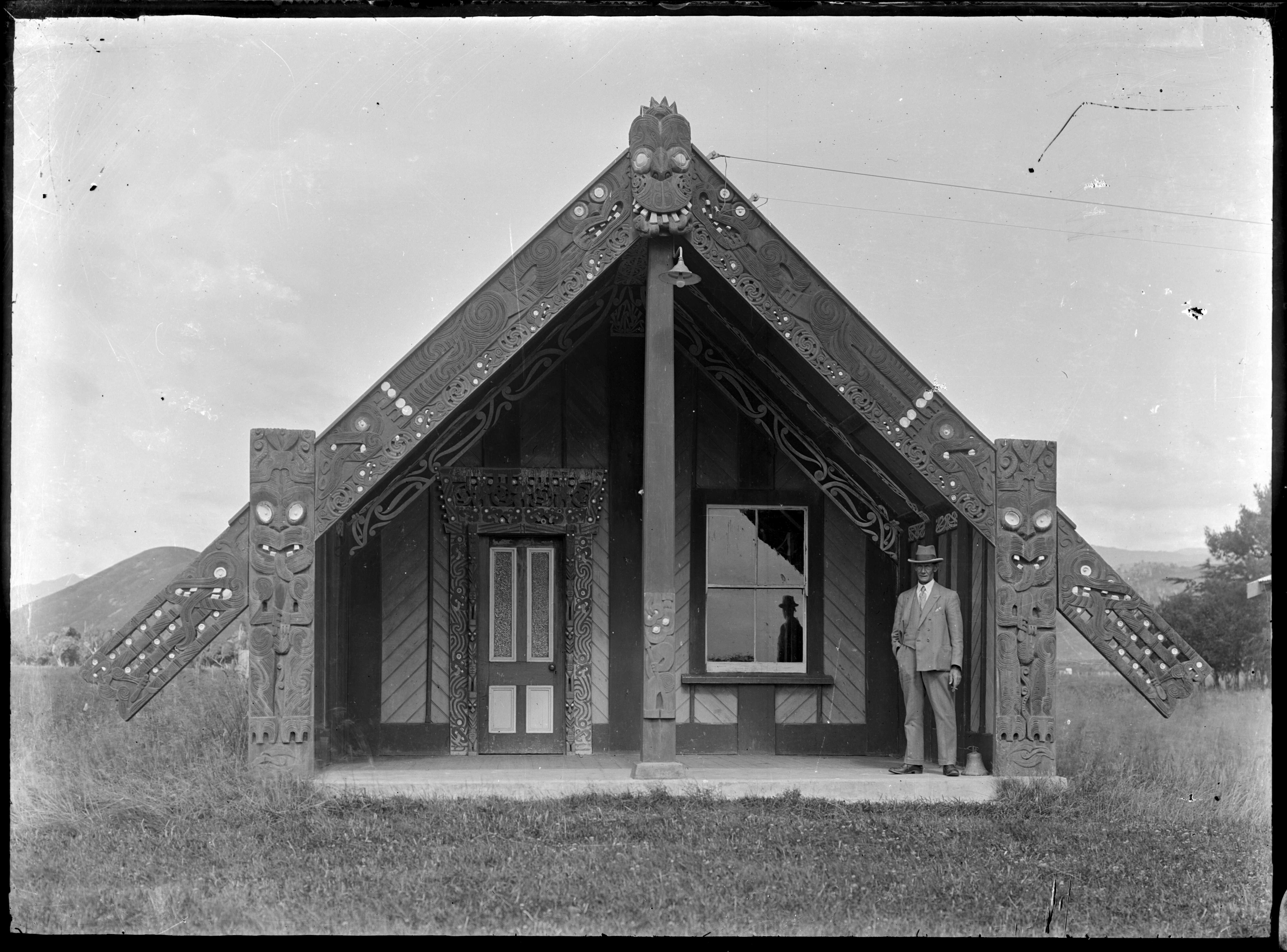
Meeting house in Ohau

Ōhau had a population of 771 in the 2023 New Zealand census, an increase of 120 people (18.4%) since the 2018 census, and an increase of 228 people (42.0%) since the 2013 census. There were 399 males, 363 females, and 6 people of other genders in 303 dwellings. 2.7% of people identified as LGBTIQ+. The median age was 51.7 years (compared with 38.1 years nationally). There were 111 people (14.4%) aged under 15 years, 96 (12.5%) aged 15 to 29, 339 (44.0%) aged 30 to 64, and 222 (28.8%) aged 65 or older.

People could identify as more than one ethnicity. The results were 90.7% European (Pākehā); 12.1% Māori; 3.9% Pasifika; 2.7% Asian; 0.4% Middle Eastern, Latin American and African New Zealanders (MELAA); and 1.9% other, which includes people giving their ethnicity as "New Zealander". English was spoken by 96.9%, Māori by 1.9%, Samoan by 1.9%, and other languages by 5.4%. No language could be spoken by 2.3% (e.g. too young to talk). New Zealand Sign Language was known by 0.4%. The percentage of people born overseas was 21.0, compared with 28.8% nationally.

Religious affiliations were 34.6% Christian, 0.8% Buddhist, 0.4% New Age, 0.4% Jewish, and 0.4% other religions. People who answered that they had no religion were 54.9%, and 8.2% of people did not answer the census question.

Of those at least 15 years old, 102 (15.5%) people had a bachelor's or higher degree, 399 (60.5%) had a post-high school certificate or diploma, and 156 (23.6%) people exclusively held high school qualifications. The median income was $34,800, compared with $41,500 nationally. 78 people (11.8%) earned over $100,000 compared to 12.1% nationally. The employment status of those at least 15 was 300 (45.5%) full-time, 102 (15.5%) part-time, and 9 (1.4%) unemployed.

=== Ōhau-Manakau ===
Ōhau-Manakau statistical area, which includes Manakau, covers 41.75 km^{2} (16.12 sq mi) and had an estimated population of 2,340 as of June 2025, with a population density of 56.05 people per km^{2}.

Historical population of Ōhau-Manakau
Year	Pop.	±% p.a.
2006	1,791	—
2013	1,782	−0.07%
2018	2,049	+2.83%
2023	2,262	+2.00%
The 2006 population is for a larger area of 42.23 km^{2}. Source:

Ōhau-Manakau had a population of 2,262 in the 2023 New Zealand census, an increase of 213 people (10.4%) since the 2018 census, and an increase of 480 people (26.9%) since the 2013 census. There were 1,155 males, 1,101 females, and 9 people of other genders in 885 dwellings. 2.9% of people identified as LGBTIQ+. The median age was 50.4 years (compared with 38.1 years nationally). There were 333 people (14.7%) aged under 15 years, 300 (13.3%) aged 15 to 29, 1,047 (46.3%) aged 30 to 64, and 582 (25.7%) aged 65 or older.

People could identify as more than one ethnicity. The results were 84.5% European (Pākehā); 18.8% Māori; 4.9% Pasifika; 4.9% Asian; 0.5% Middle Eastern, Latin American and African New Zealanders (MELAA); and 2.5% other, which includes people giving their ethnicity as "New Zealander". English was spoken by 96.8%, Māori by 4.8%, Samoan by 0.8%, and other languages by 8.9%. No language could be spoken by 1.3% (e.g. too young to talk). New Zealand Sign Language was known by 0.4%. The percentage of people born overseas was 19.8, compared with 28.8% nationally.

Religious affiliations were 29.8% Christian, 0.5% Hindu, 0.3% Māori religious beliefs, 0.7% Buddhist, 0.8% New Age, 0.1% Jewish, and 0.9% other religions. People who answered that they had no religion were 58.9%, and 8.1% of people did not answer the census question.

Of those at least 15 years old, 315 (16.3%) people had a bachelor's or higher degree, 1,089 (56.5%) had a post-high school certificate or diploma, and 528 (27.4%) people exclusively held high school qualifications. The median income was $35,300, compared with $41,500 nationally. 210 people (10.9%) earned over $100,000 compared to 12.1% nationally. The employment status of those at least 15 was 933 (48.4%) full-time, 300 (15.6%) part-time, and 30 (1.6%) unemployed.

== Education ==
Ōhau School is a co-educational state primary school for Year 1 to 8 students, with a roll of 154 as of July 2026. It opened in 1891.
