= Capital Connection =

Commuter train operated in New Zealand

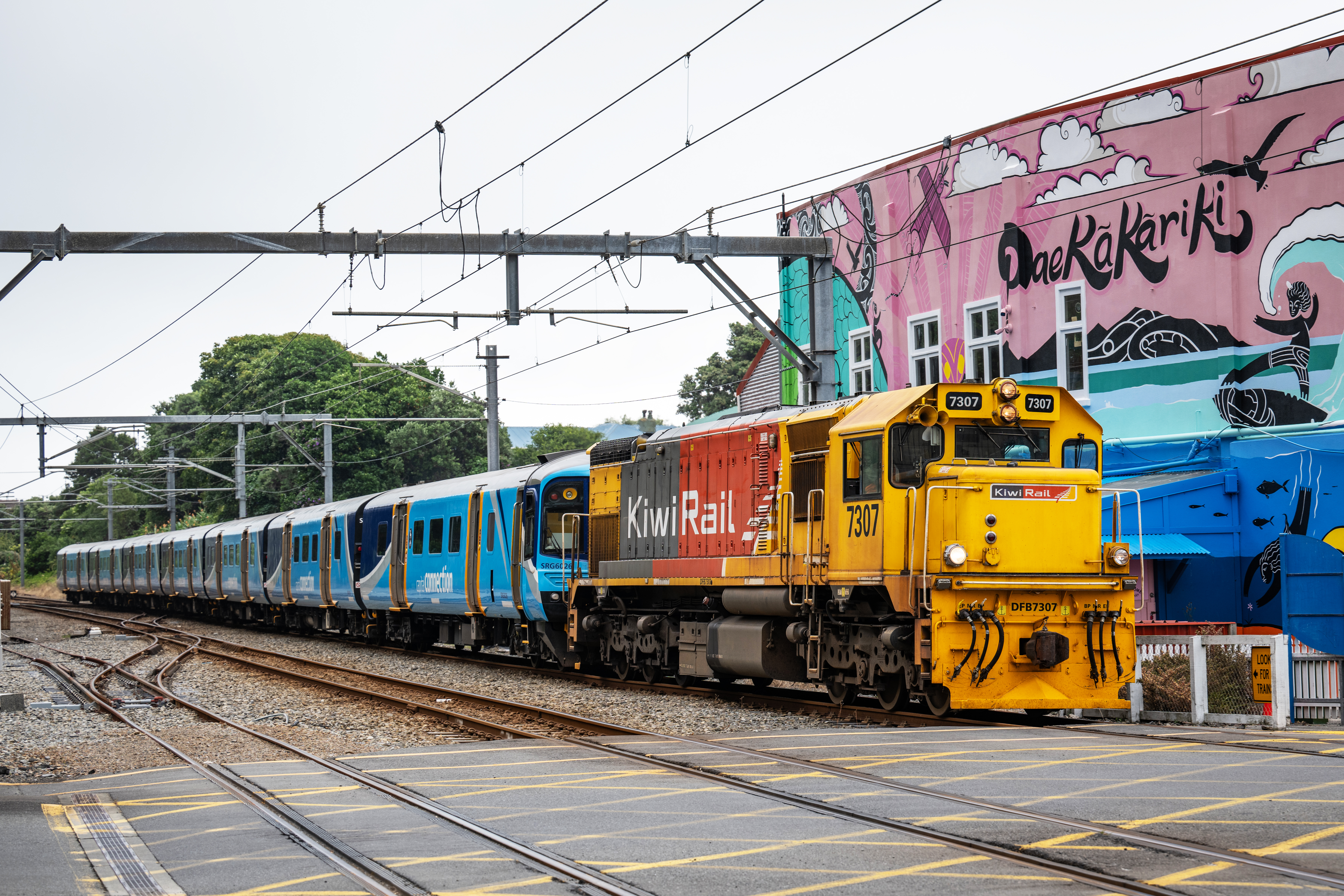
- A Capital Connection train passing through Paekākāriki, 8 February 2024

Overview
- Service type: Commuter rail
- Status: Operating
- Locale: Lower North Island, New Zealand
- First service: 15 April 1991
- Current operator: KiwiRail
- Former operators: Cityrail (1991–1995); Tranz Metro (1995–2001); Tranz Scenic (1995–2017)
- Ridership: 185,472 trips (2008–2009); 159,641 (2011–2012); 100,531 trips (2024-2025)
- Website: https://www.greatjourneysofnz.co.nz/northern-explorer/book/other-services/capital-connection/

Route
- Termini: Palmerston North; Wellington
- Stops: 7
- Distance travelled: 136 km (85 mi)
- Average journey time: 2 hours, 6 minutes
- Service frequency: One service each way daily (Mon-Fri); No service Sat, Sun, and public holidays

On-board services
- Seating arrangements: Airline-style; Alcove with table
- Catering facilities: On-board café
- Baggage facilities: Overhead racks Baggage carriage

Technical
- Rolling stock: New Zealand DF class locomotives S class carriages (ex-British Rail Mark 2)
- Track gauge: 1,067 mm (3 ft 6 in)
- Operating speed: 65 km/h (40 mph) average

The Capital Connection is a long-distance commuter train operated by KiwiRail between Palmerston North and the capital city of Wellington on the Wellington-Manawatu section of the North Island Main Trunk.

In 2018, the service faced funding issues, but the Government ensured that the service would continue, with the NZ Transport Agency (NZTA, otherwise known as Waka Kotahi) and regional councils investing in subsidies and the replenishment of rolling stock.

The modernisation and replacement of the service has been included in the Horizons Regional Council 2021–2031 Regional Land Transport Plan and the Greater Wellington Regional Council plan.

The service is to be replaced by the Tūhono trains i.e. New Zealand BEMU class electric multiple units to provide a modern and more frequent service in 2030.

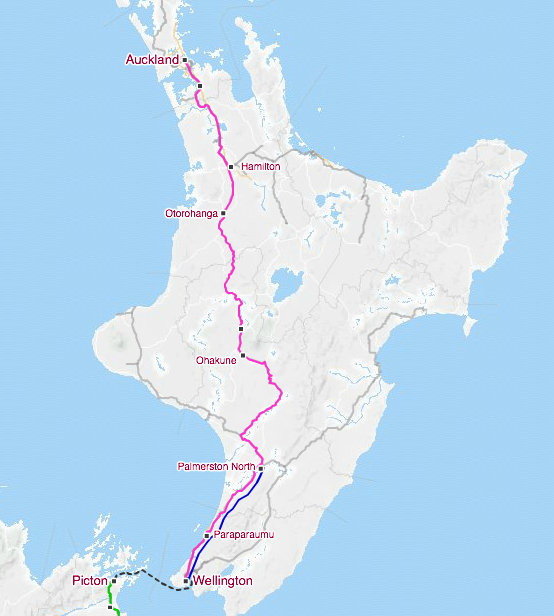
KiwiRail passenger trains in the North Island

== History ==
The service started on Monday 15 April 1991 as the Cityrail Express, with "Cityrail EXPRESS Palmerston North – Wellington" emblazoned on carriage sides.

=== Historic threats to the service ===
Concerns were raised that once the Kāpiti Line services were extended north from Paraparaumu to Waikanae, the Capital Connection would lose passengers. In 2010, KiwiRail stated it would consider changes after evaluating what impact the metro system has on the Capital Connection's patronage. The extension to Waikanae was opened in 2011. By July 2012 the future of the service seemed to be very uncertain. KiwiRail announced it would make a decision on the service in August 2012. Patronage dropped by 26,000 trips per annum (from 185,472 trips in the 2008–09 financial year to 159,641 in the 2011–12 financial year.)

The Greater Wellington Regional Council and the Horowhenua District Council proposed partial funding but needed the NZTA to agree to continue the service. NZTA's public transport funding criteria require that a service must reduce traffic on a congested road. In August 2012 Greater Wellington Regional Council and Horizons (Manawatū-Whanganui Regional Council) proposed a business case for a subsidy which was evaluated by NZTA.

The business case argued that:

- Greater Wellington Regional Council should integrate the service and its rolling stock into its Metlink service;
- A $311,000 subsidy from NZTA and $216,000 subsidy from Greater Wellington and Horizons Regional Council (to be shared proportionate to patronage) be paid to KiwiRail;
- These subsidies to continue for five years.

In March 2013, the Member of Parliament for Palmerston North, Iain Lees-Galloway, presented a petition of 2,000 signatures supporting the service at a parliamentary select committee hearing. In May 2014 he said that he was not surprised at the drop in patronage following a fare rise.

In April 2013, KiwiRail said to keep the service operating, it would have increased ticket prices by 40 percent, and have at least 61 passengers on board in each direction. But it only increased fares by 10% from May.

On 1 July 2015, KiwiRail confirmed, that funding had been approved by Horizons Regional Council and the Greater Wellington Regional Council signing off their Long Term plans, including a subsidy for the service for another three years. KiwiRail Scenic Journeys said there would be maintenance and repairs for each of the carriages, at staggered intervals over the next 12 months, to improve the service.

In 2016, it was reported patronage on the service had increased for the first time in three years.

=== Historic proposals ===
Proposals to improve the service have been made throughout the train's life. This includes one by Palmerston North City Councillor Chris Teo-Sherrell to terminate the service in Waikanae to connect to the Kapiti Tranz Metro services, and another by Palmerston North Mayor Grant Smith to double the daily frequency. Neither of these proposals were adopted.

== Operator ==
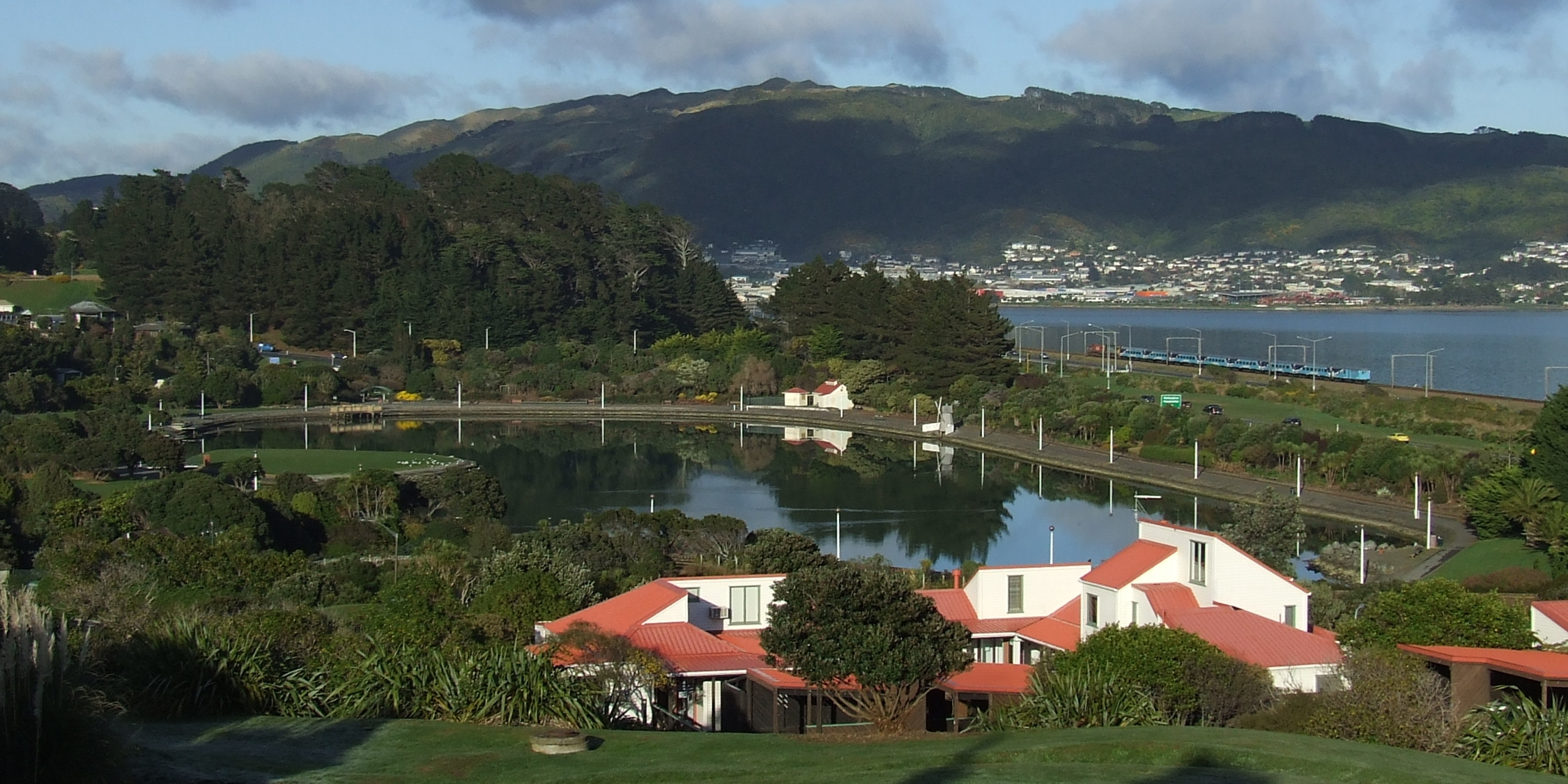
The southbound Capital Connection passes Aotea Lagoon and the southern arm of Porirua Harbour as it approaches Porirua.

From 1991, the train was operated by New Zealand Rail suburban passenger division CityRail, which was re-branded Tranz Metro in 1995 when New Zealand Rail itself was rebranded Tranz Rail. In 2001, with the partial sale of Tranz Scenic (the long-distance passenger division of Tranz Rail), the company sought to separate its commercial passenger rail operations from its subsidised services (which remained in Wellington under Tranz Metro), operation of the train was transferred to Tranz Scenic. KiwiRail is the current operator of the service.

== Service ==
The train operates Monday to Friday from Palmerston North to Wellington in the morning, returning in the evening. The service stops at 5 stations within the Wellington and Manawatū-Whanganui regions.

=== Weekend services ===
On Sunday 19 June 1994, a weekend service from Palmerston North to Wellington and return started. The power/baggage van, catering car and 50-seat (alcove-style with tables) day car (ex Masterton) made up the consist. It attracted minimal patronage and was withdrawn later that year.

== Future ==
Replacement trains, the New Zealand BEMU class electric multiple unit, were approved in 2025; they are to enter service in 2030.

In 2019, the Greater Wellington Regional Council (GWRC) proposed replacing the Capital Connection and Wairarapa Connection trains with 15 four-car bi-mode multiple units by 2025. These trains are estimated to cost $415 million.

The "infrastructure spendup" announced on 30 January 2020 included some upgrading of the present rolling stock but not the proposed hybrid trains (see New Zealand Upgrade Programme).

For the future of KiwiRail's regional passenger rail services, the Capital Connection and Te Huia (2022) see:

=== 2021–2031 expansion ===
The 2021–2031 Horizons Regional Land Transport Plan recognised the importance of the service to the region and the environment. It also stated that the service, carriages and locomotives would need to be upgraded if it was to continue operating past 2025. The plan also provides for higher frequency of trains, utilising a larger fleet of trains and updated stations. The plan states that buses may be able to connect regional towns to this upgraded service. A detailed business case is being created to analyse any improvements.

The Horizons Plan also noted that KiwiRail is investigating an inter-regional connector service, which would connect districts to urban services. Horizons note that there is opportunity to create a Whanganui – Palmerston North train service akin to this inter-regional proposal.

The service's rolling stock was refurbished in 2022/2023 at the Hutt Workshops. The carriages left the workshop on 22 February 2023 for Palmerston North. The new set includes six S class coaches, refurbished in a Suburban Regional (SR) style similar to Te Huia (including SR5968), and a refurbished baggage carriage (AG176).

== Rolling stock and motive power ==
The service began using standard NZR 56-foot carriages: the first of two power-baggage vans from the Bay Express, a 50-seat Southerner car, a 42-seat Northerner car and a 37-seat Northerner catering car. When the Northerner and Southerner cars were returned to their respective trains and patronage continued to increase a former Masterton commuter car was refurbished to the same standard, with the same 50 alcove-style seats as the Southerner car, but with sheepskin seat covers.

Later, a former Endeavour car with luggage space at one end and a former Picton – Greymouth car, both from on the Masterton commuter run, were refurbished for the service. Later still, up to five more Masterton cars, a Northerner car, the second Northerner catering car and the sole InterCity spare buffet car saw service. Before these carriages were replaced, the service was regularly running with a van and eight cars.

=== British Rail carriages ===
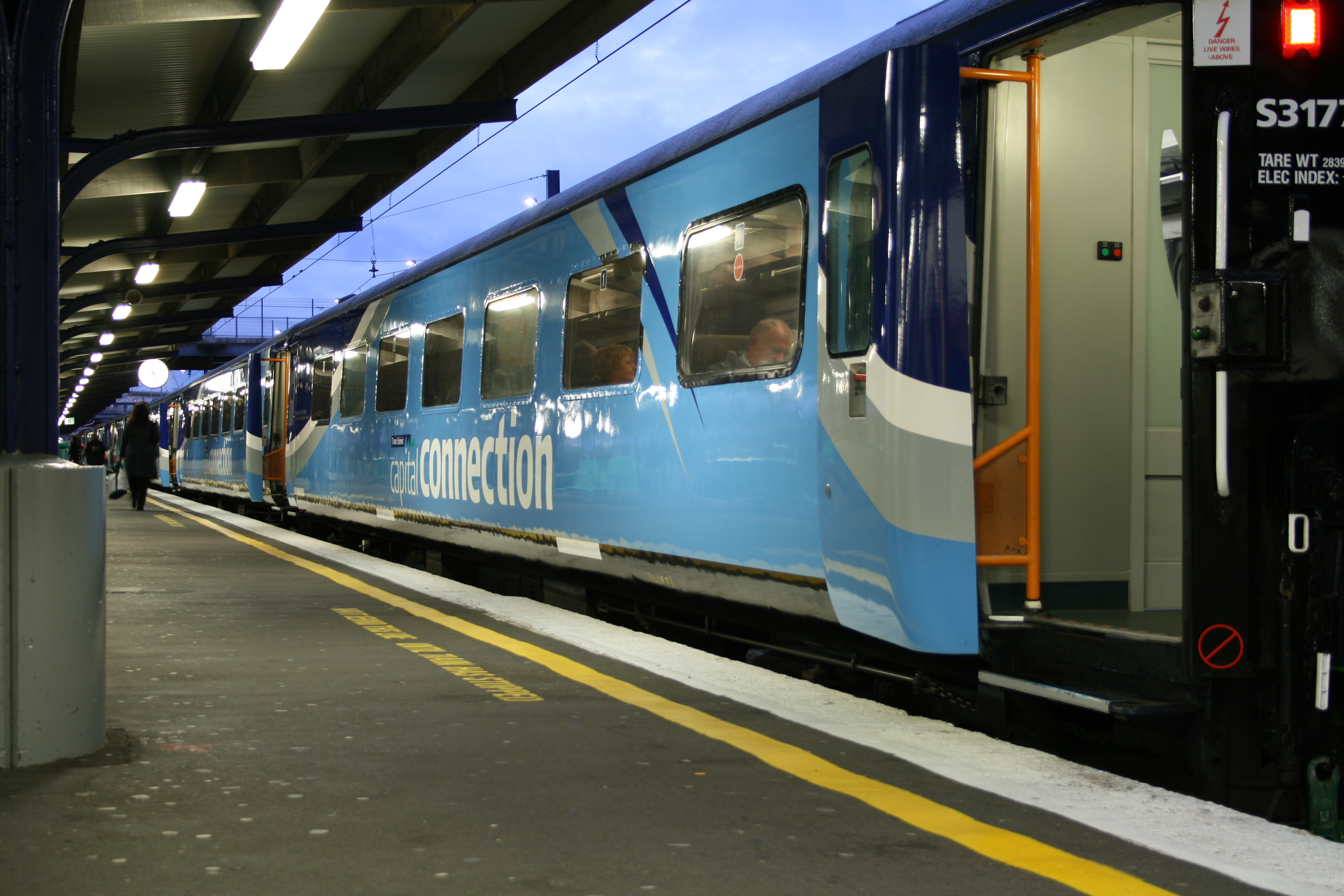
S class carriages

On Monday 15 November 1999, a new train entered service, made up of seven (later eight) British Rail Mark 2 cars and the second former Southerner modular 11 kW power and baggage van, with 90 kW generator and larger luggage space made up from the middle and expanded non-handbrake end compartments. The new cars are about three metres longer than the older cars and more spacious inside, with more headroom, full air-conditioning, 60 seats per car (28 in the servery car), and twin power sockets at the foot of each pair of seats. Seating arrangement is both alcove and airline-style, using their British Rail InterCity 72 seats. Since October 2016, fire suppressed DFB class locomotives have been assigned to the service.

They have been repainted from Tranz Scenic standard "Cato blue" into Capital Connection livery. The S cars made their last journey to Palmerston North on 28 July 2023. The SR carriages took over from Monday 31st.

12 former Maxx /Auckland Transport SA class used on the Auckland Suburban network were relocated from storage in Tauramanui and refurbished to a design similar to the Te Huia Hamilton to Auckland train under the Upgrade New Zealand Programme. The 12 refurbished carriages entered service in 2023.

The S class consist of carriages was retired 30 July 2023 and replaced the next day by SR class on the Capital Connection.

== Capital Connection 2023 SR (Regional) class ==
Class	BR type	Number	Notes
SRG	2F TSO	6026	Generator Car. Former Auckland SD driving/generator carriage
SRG	2F TSO	6182	Generator Car. Former Auckland SD driving/generator carriage
SRC	2F TSO	6159	Café carriage, Former Auckland SA
SR	2F TSO	5784	Former Auckland SA
SR	2F TSO	5968	Former Auckland SA
SR	2F TSO	5975	Former Auckland SA
SR	2F TSO	6010	Former Auckland SA
SR	2F TSO	6011	Former Auckland SA
SR	2F TSO	6025	Former Auckland SA
SR	2F TSO	6123	Former Auckland SA
SR	2F TSO	6172	Former Auckland SA

=== Future rolling stock ===
See re new trains Public transport in the Wellington Region

In 2019, the GWRC proposed replacing in 2025 the Capital Connection and Wairarapa Connection trains with 15 four-car dual-mode multiple units, to operate from overhead power from Wellington to Upper Hutt or an on-board power source north of Upper Hutt; to cost $415 million.

In 2022 a business case for extending the Kāpiti Line as far as Levin was pushed for by transport minister Michael Wood; adding an extra 35 km to the line to (or past) Ōtaki. In 2023 it was announced that 18 four-car trains will be built for the Kāpiti and Wairarapa lines. In September 2025, Alstom was awarded a $1,066m (NZD) contract to build and maintain 18 new battery trains in Wellington. The trains will be built in India. The trains will arrive in NZ in around 2029 and enter service in 2030.

In 2025 GWRC announced the new rolling rolling stock to be five-car battery electric multiple unit (BEMU) trains built by French manufacturer Alstom, named Tūhono meaning connect or unite. The trains are based on Alstom’s Adessia trains but with changes to narrow Cape gauge and front evacuation doors. They are expected to start service in 2030.

== See also ==
- Tranz Scenic
- Wellington railway station
- Tranz Metro
