= Longburn railway station =

Defunct railway station in New Zealand

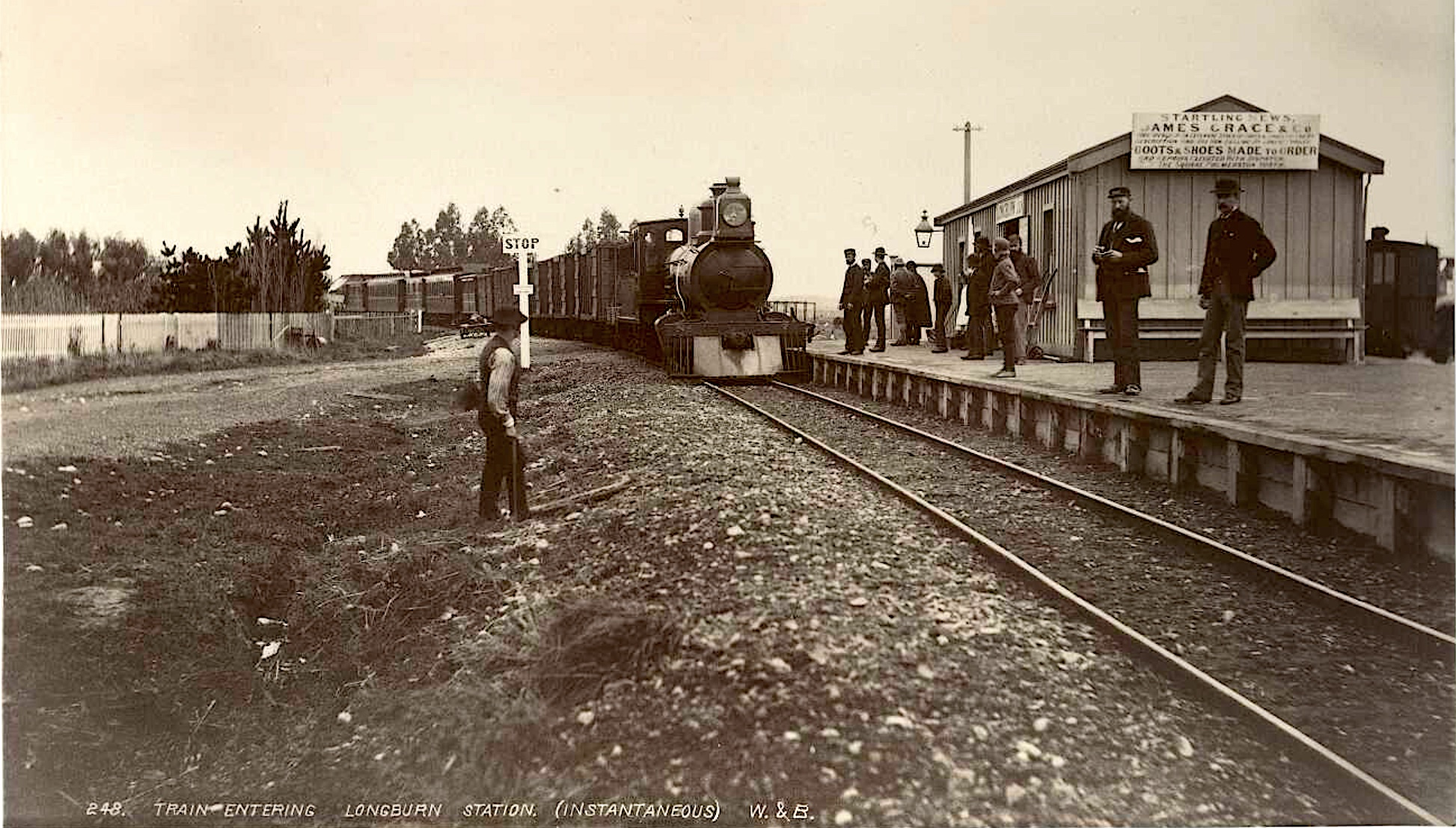
- Wellington and Manawatu locomotive no 7 with the mail train from Wellington. The Foxton train waits at the other platform, in 1888 or 1889

General information
- Location: Longburn, New Zealand
- Coordinates: 40.385447°S 175.53967°E
- Elevation: 20 m (66 ft)
- Line: North Island Main Trunk
- Distance: Wellington 129.94 km (80.74 mi)

History
- Opened: 26 July 1873
- Closed: passengers 5 July 1981 goods 13 October 1986
- Rebuilt: 1962
- Former names: Long Burn, Longburn Junction

Services
Preceding station	Historical railways	Following station
Awapuni; Line closed 1 mi 8 ch (1.8 km)	Foxton Branch; NZR	Karere; Line closed 1.71 km (1.06 mi)
Palmerston North; Line open, station open 6.29 km (3.91 mi)	North Island Main Trunk; KiwiRail	Linton; Line open, station closed 5.72 km (3.55 mi)
Location

Longburn railway station was a station in Longburn, on the North Island Main Trunk in New Zealand. The platform, which is across from the Fonterra Factory, remains but the structure has been demolished.

There have been four station sites at Longburn. From 1873 it was on the Foxton-Palmerston North tramway. When the Wellington and Manawatu Railway Company (WMR) opened from 1885, a station was built to the south of the Foxton line (see photo to right), in 1905 a new station opened on the Awapuni side of the junction and, after the Milson Deviation opened in 1959, a new station was built to the north in 1962.

The station was originally called Long Burn, then Longburn Junction and Longburn. The junction role was diminished once the WMR became part of New Zealand Railways Department (NZR) and, since closure of the Foxton branch, it has only had junctions with sidings.

The only clear remnants of the stations are two passing loops.

Fonterra transports milk collected from farms by rail from southern Hawke's Bay to Longburn and runs two trains a day to Whareroa.

== History ==
Long Burn station opened on the Foxton tramway on 26 July 1873, 31.2 km (19.4 mi) from Foxton. The station reopened with conversion of the wooden tramway to a railway on 20 October 1876, though Longburn wasn't shown in the timetable when services through to Whanganui began in 1878. By 1884 it had a shelter shed, platform, cart approach and a loop for 18 wagons.

The station was the northern terminus of the WMR. The line through Longburn is now part of the North Island Main Trunk Railway, completed in 1909.

A special train ran over the WMR as far as Ohau in April 1886. The line between Longburn and Wellington was completed in 1886 and at Longburn, passengers and goods transferred between the WMR south to Wellington and the NZR network. Longburn became a junction from Monday 2 August 1886, when WMR trains started to run between Longburn and Ōtaki. WMR trains were noted as connecting with New Plymouth and Foxton trains at Longburn on 30 October 1886. Special trains ran from Whanganui and Wellington to the WMR's last spike ceremony at Otaihanga on 3 November 1886. The first through train from Wellington to Palmerston North ran on 30 November 1886, but the regular timetable only provided for connections at Longburn. Times were altered on the Foxton to New Plymouth line to fit in with WMR trains.

WMR wrote in September 1890, "Traffic requires that we should run daily instead of five days a week, and would be obliged if you would arrange to connect with our trains morning and evenings as usual at Longburn, commencing on and after Thursday, 9th instant." From 1888 to 1934 there was an engine shed and turntable.

Cattle yards opened in 1889, with sheep yards in 1904 . They were enlarged and altered, until 1970, when the sheep yards were sold for removal. By 1979, no animals were being railed into or out of Longburn. The yards officially closed on 25 February 1980.

From 1890 at least 8 railway houses were built. By 1980 there were three railway houses. A stationmaster's house was built by WMR in 1887 and occupied by a NZR stationmaster from May 1887. By 1896 there was a station building, platform, cart approach, loading bank, urinals and a loop for 23 wagons.

From 1892 to 1929 there was a Post Office at the station. By 1892 there was a goods shed, which in 1911 was noted as 40 ft x 30 ft.

£1,336 was allocated for a new joint NZR/WMR station, with verandah, built on the Awapuni side of the junction, which opened on 23 October 1905. By then WMR trains were running through to Palmerston and beyond. To cater for the change, the Junction Hotel was rebuilt in 1906. By 1911 the station had a loading bank, cattle and sheep yards, crane and a loop for 60 wagons, extended to 83 wagons in 1942. In 1923 electric lighting was added.

On 8 December 1908, the WMR was absorbed into the NZR and Longburn lost its significant interchange status. However the Foxton Branch was retained and only closed in 1959. The line to Palmerston North was rerouted via the Milson Deviation from 1962.

On Sunday 25 February 1962 a new station building opened to the north of the Junction station, with a luggage and parcels office (17'-0” x 9'-6”), booking office (26'-6” x 16'-0” overall), and staff room (18'-6” x 9'-6”), conveniences, a passing loop, three loops, goods shed, loading bank, loading shelter and an unformed road to the station.

Sunday 5 July 1981 was the last day Longburn was open to passengers. It remained open for goods and parcels until 13 October 1986, though a 1985 report said the station building was derelict, but 4 platform lamps remained. In 1995 the station building and platform were extant.

Longburn signalbox, which had been south of the 1906 station, was moved to Feilding in March 2021. From 1901 there was block working between Palmerston North and Longburn. In 1908 tablets were added, though removed between Longburn and Foxton from 22 August 1932.

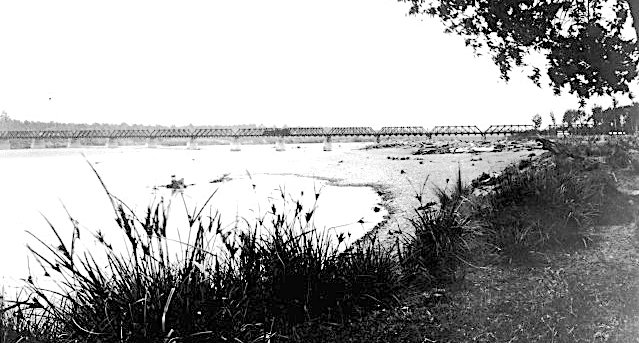
WMR Manawatū River bridge near Longburn, looking south in about 1886

Private sidings existed from 1884, belonging at various times to Manawatu Cheese & Butter Co, Beale & Co's slaughter house, Longburn Freezing, Kiwi Bacon, Karanga Meat, National Mortgage & Agency, Co-operative Wholesale Society, Kairanga Dairy, Rongotea Dairy and Sanitarium. In 1999 Kiwi Co-operative Dairies opened a new cheese powder plant.

== Manawatū River bridge ==
About 2.5 km (1.6 mi) south of Longburn the NIMT crosses the Manawatū River on a 366 m (1,201 ft) long bridge. It replaced the original 361 m (1,184 ft) timber bridge, which was about 1 km (0.62 mi) further upstream, from 18 October 1960 and cost £170,000. Work on the original bridge started in 1882. The 20-span bridge has steel girders, resting on reinforced concrete piers.
