= Ōtaki railway station =

Railway station in New Zealand

Ōtaki
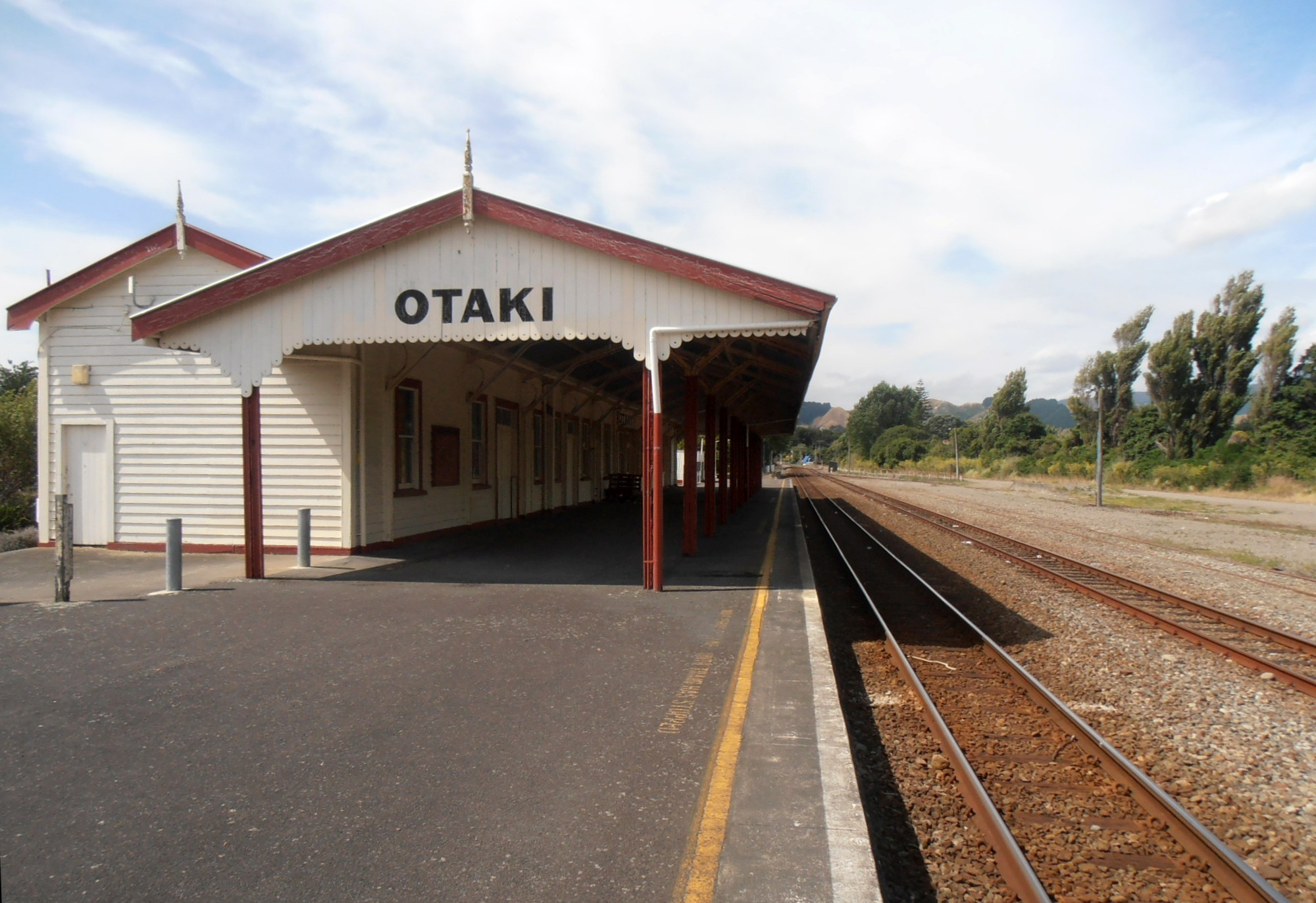
- Ōtaki Railway Station on 15 February 2016

General information
- Location: Arthur Street, Ōtaki, New Zealand
- Coordinates: 40.7629°S 175.1564°E
- Elevation: 15 m (49 ft)
- Owner: KiwiRail
- Line: North Island Main Trunk
- Distance: Wellington 70.49 km (43.80 mi)
- Platforms: 1
- Tracks: 2

Construction
- Parking: Yes
- Architect: George Troup
- Architectural style: Troup Type B

Other information
- Classification: RHTNZ Category B building

History
- Opened: 2 August 1886
- Rebuilt: 1909, 1911

Services
Preceding station	KiwiRail	Following station
Levin towards Palmerston North	Capital Connection	Waikanae towards Wellington

Historic railways
Preceding station	Historical railways	Following station
Manakau; Line open, station closed 8.9 km (5.5 mi)	North Island Main Trunk; KiwiRail	Hautere; Line open, station closed 2.68 km (1.67 mi)

Heritage New Zealand – Category 2
- Designated: 5 September 1985
- Reference no.: 4099
Location

Ōtaki railway station is a station on the North Island Main Trunk railway line serving Ōtaki in the Kapiti Coast District of New Zealand. It is served by the Capital Connection long distance commuter train between Wellington and Palmerston North.

== History ==
The station was opened by the Wellington and Manawatu Railway Company (W&MR) as an intermediate station on the Wellington-Manawatu Line in 1886, with an excursion train from Longburn Junction to Ōtaki on 2 August. At that time the journey south to Paikakariki was continued by Hall's coaches. The first through train from Wellington to Palmerston North ran on 30 November 1886. Fergus and Blair of Dunedin had the contract for building the Manakau to Ōtaki section.

The station building was similar to a Fourth Class railway station built for the NZR by the Public Works Department. The station building had a ladies' waiting room and an office for the stationmaster. The yard had four tracks, a loading ramp, a goods shed, and an engine house and turntable. Initially the station was known as New Otaki to differentiate it from the original settlement, but was soon changed to Otaki. A refreshment room was added in 1893.

Following the nationalisation of W&MR in 1908, a new station was opened in 1909, but was destroyed by fire on 24 July 1910. The replacement Type B station was designed by the notable NZR architect George Troup, and opened in February 1911. It has a New Zealand Historic Places Trust Class II listing.

== Services ==
The following Metlink bus routes serve Ōtaki station:

- 290: Ōtaki Beach

== Future ==
=== Northern Corridor ===
With realignment of the Peka Peka to Ōtaki extension of the Kāpiti Expressway (part of the Northern Corridor project) north of Ōtaki the rail curve north of Ōtaki was realigned by Easter 2019 and the station yard moved south. The 1.2 km (0.75 mi) of realigned route allows for a future double-track formation.

The northern section of the platform was removed, the passing loop was extended north and is now 1050 m long, and the platform extends 60 m south with the new section raised to 680 mm above the railhead (200 mm higher than the previous section). The signalling was upgraded, all train detection is now by axle-counters, and new 50 kg/m rails and composite (plastic) sleepers used beneath the yard turnouts. The deviation was bought into use on 22 April 2019.

=== Electrification ===
There is currently a campaign to extend the electrified commuter services to Ōtaki, following the extension of the electrification of the Kāpiti Line from Paraparaumu to Waikanae. In 2012 the Greater Wellington Regional Council investigated extension of the electrification with Matangi trains north of Waikanae to Ōtaki (estimated cost $30 million for the Ōtaki project) and north of Upper Hutt to a new station at Timberlea. However, extension of electrification north to Ōtaki was removed from official long-term rail improvement plans in 2014. The estimated cost of electrification was put between $115m and $135m, which included new trains. New trains were included as trains with toilets would be required, due to the travel time to Wellington to Ōtaki being over one hour. This could be a "final nail in the coffin" for the under threat Capital Connection service from Wellington to Palmerston North, which also stops at Ōtaki. During the 2017 general election, the Green Party proposed extending electrification to Ōtaki as an alternative to the Northern Corridor extension from Peka Peka. However, electrification plans have not proceeded any further.

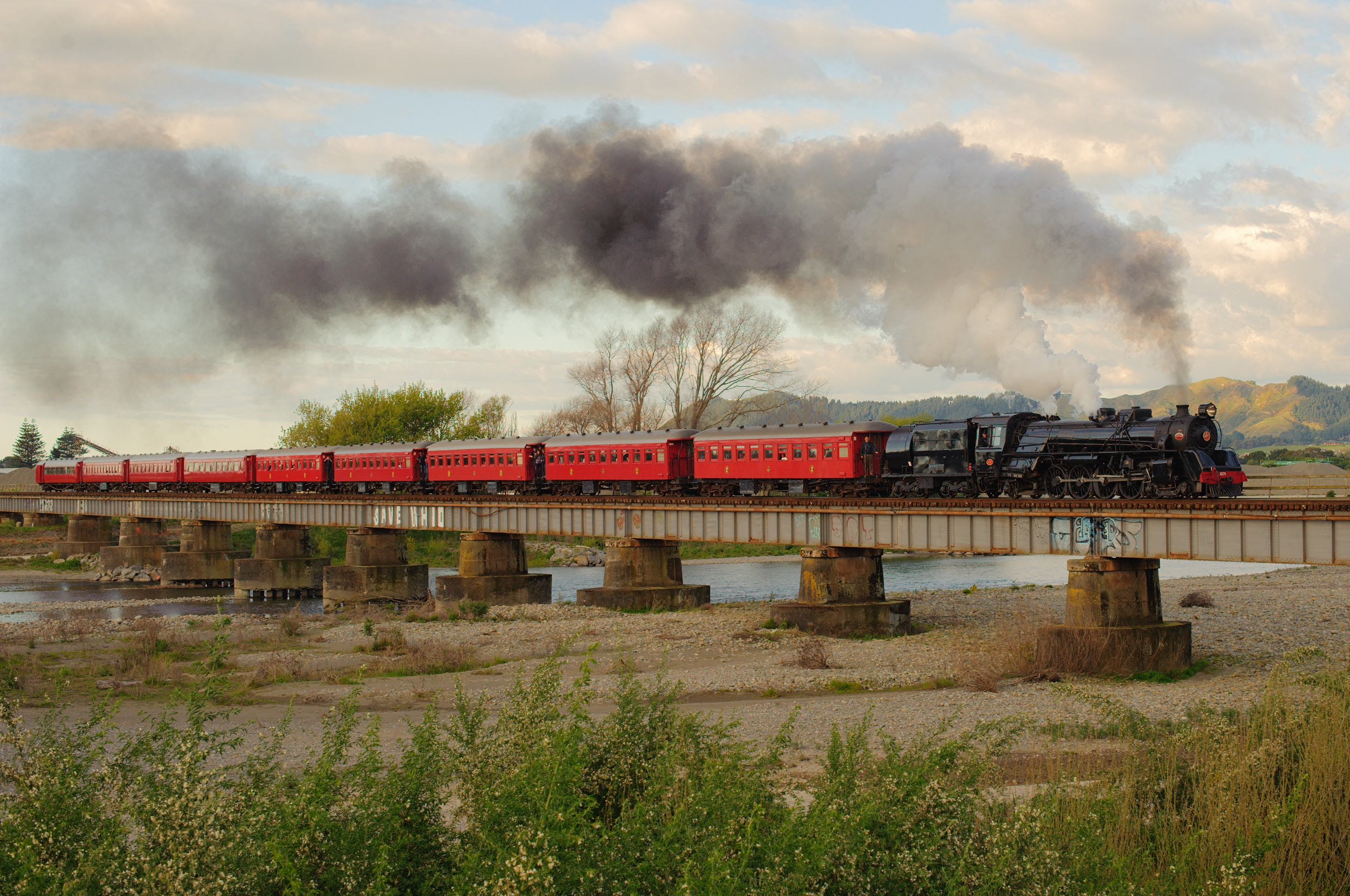
Ōtaki River bridge in 2012

== Ōtaki River Bridge ==
The railway crosses the Ōtaki River on a 19-span, 293 m (961 ft) steel girder bridge, about 1 km (0.62 mi) south of the station. The bridge was strengthened in 1897 and 1907 and rebuilt in 1931, using a 45 hp (34 kW) electric motor for pile driving.
