= Mangatainoka railway station =

Defunct railway station in New Zealand

Mangatainoka
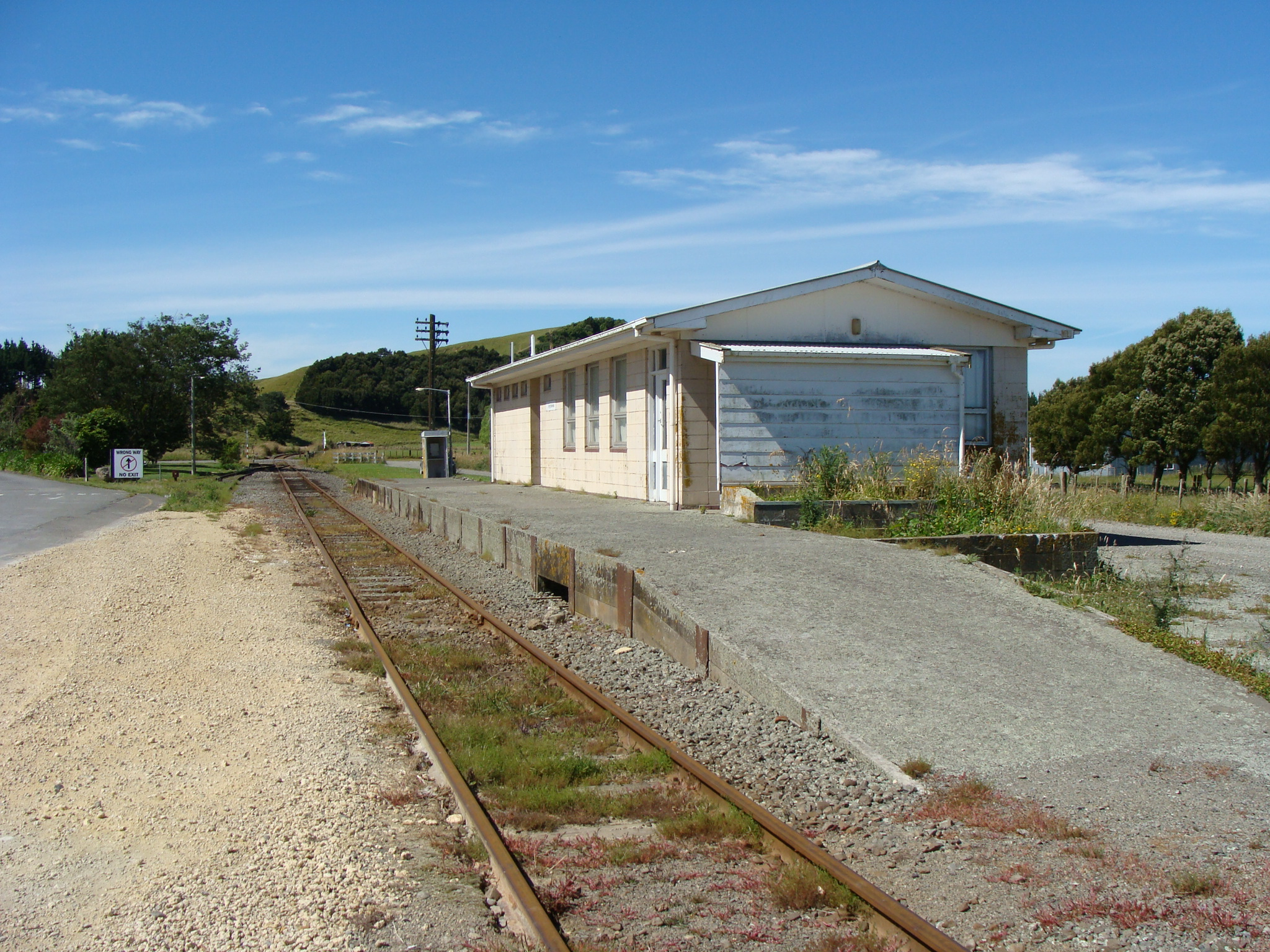
- Mangatainoka railway station in 2008

General information
- Location: Mangatainoka Street West; Mangatainoka 4982; New Zealand
- Coordinates: 40°24′49.644″S 175°51′44.3196″E
- Elevation: 98 metres (322 ft)
- System: New Zealand Government Railways (NZGR); Regional rail
- Owner: KiwiRail
- Operator: Pahiatua Railcar Society (lessee)
- Line: Wairarapa Line
- Distance: 159.10 kilometres (98.86 mi) from Wellington
- Platforms: Single side
- Tracks: Main line (1); Loop (1)
- Train operators: Kiwirail

Construction
- Structure type: at-grade
- Parking: No

History
- Opened: 1 July 1897
- Closed: 1 August 1988 (passengers); ? (freight)
- Rebuilt: 1973
Location
Notes
- Previous Station: Pahiatua Station; Next Station: Ngawapurua Station

The Mangatainoka railway station on the Wairarapa Line was located in the Tararua District of the Manawatū-Whanganui region in New Zealand’s North Island. Located between the stations of Pahiatua (to the south) and Ngawapurua (to the north), it served the farming settlement of Mangatainoka and surrounding districts.

The station opened on 1 July 1897 as part of an extension of the Wairarapa Line north from Pahiatua and remained the northern railhead until the line opened to Woodville on 13 December 1897. The station closed on 1 August 1988 (other than wagonloads of fertilizer to the neighbouring Ravensdown depot).

== Services ==
With the full line to Woodville open, the Napier Express passenger trains were diverted from the Palmerston North terminus to run from Woodville down the Wairarapa Line to Wellington and were known as the Napier Mail. This became the main passenger service through Mangatainoka, supplementing the mixed trains that had served Mangatainoka up to this time.

The line remained busy until the Wellington and Manawatu Railway Company’s line from Wellington to Longburn was purchased by the government in 1908. This had a large impact on services provided in the Wairarapa, particularly the section of the line north of Masterton. Because of the lengthy and costly delays associated with the operation of the Rimutaka Incline, much freight traffic from the northern Wairarapa region was diverted north through Woodville and Palmerston North so it could be taken down the Main Trunk Line to Wellington.

The Napier Mail was also diverted via Palmerston North, leaving Mangatainoka with mixed trains along with the replacement service named the Wairarapa Mail.

A new passenger-only service was provided from 1936 with the introduction of the RM class Wairarapa-type railcars, which supplemented and later replaced the Wairarapa Mail in 1948. The Wairarapa railcars were in turn replaced after the opening of the Rimutaka Tunnel in 1955 by the twinset railcars, which provided the main passenger service for Mangatainoka for the next 22 years. The railcar timetable of 1959 shows two northbound and two southbound railcar services stopping at Mangatainoka each day of the week with a third service on Fridays. During the period in which railcar services were provided through Mangatainoka, locomotive-hauled carriage trains were occasionally provided when demand exceeded the capacity of the railcars, but finally replaced railcar services altogether in 1977.

After the railcar services were withdrawn, patronage of passenger services on the northern section of the Wairarapa Line steadily declined as roads in the region improved. Demand finally dropped to a point where the service was no longer economical, and consequently, the Palmerston North – Masterton – Wellington and return service was withdrawn from 1 August 1988.

== Facilities ==
=== Original Station ===
The original station building was built to a "Special" design using wood and corrugated iron as building materials, similar to the station at Pahiatua in the south. The building included a post office for the community, as was common in rural areas at the time. Other facilities included a 40 x 30 ft goods shed, loading bank, cattle and sheep yards, stationmaster's house & public urinal, and three loops off the main line for shunting wagons.

The station was upgraded in 1920 with the platform front replaced with concrete and stockyards moved south to less swampy land, which required the culverting of a small stream in the area.

=== Replacement Station ===
In 1968 the Post Office was moved out of the building, and in October 1973 a tender was called for a replacement passenger building to replace the original 76-year-old building. The replacement building was constructed north of the previous building closer to Ruawhata Road and was built using concrete bricks on a concrete slab foundation, and used aluminum joinery. This contrasts with Pahiatua's replacement building constructed 2 years earlier which was built from timber.

The station gradually lost its goods handling facilities during the 1970's as traffic moved to road. The stockyards were closed in November 1975 and were removed by February 1976. The 20-ton crane was moved to Masterton in May 1980. By 1987, all that remained was the station building and fertilizer unloading facilities for Ravensdown, sited north of the former goods shed.

With the improvement of roads in the district, passenger numbers fell to a point where the service was no longer economical, and the Palmerston North – Masterton – Wellington and return service was withdrawn from 1 August 1988, with the final train passing through a few days earlier on 29 July on its way to Palmerston North.

== Today ==
Today all that remains is the 1970's station building, a short passenger platform, the former loading bank, a few railway telephone poles and a single loop serving the Ravensdown fertilizer depot. No services currently stop at Mangatainoka, as fertilizer services ended many years ago. Services continue to pass through the station heading to Fonterra's Mangamutu Dairy Factory just north of Pahiatua Station.

Occasional excursion trains also make use of the Mangatainoka Station platform.

== Accidents ==
On Tuesday 15 April 1902 Charles Spengler a one-legged man died when he fell from the station onto the track.
