= Pahiatua railway station =

Railway station in New Zealand

Pahiatua
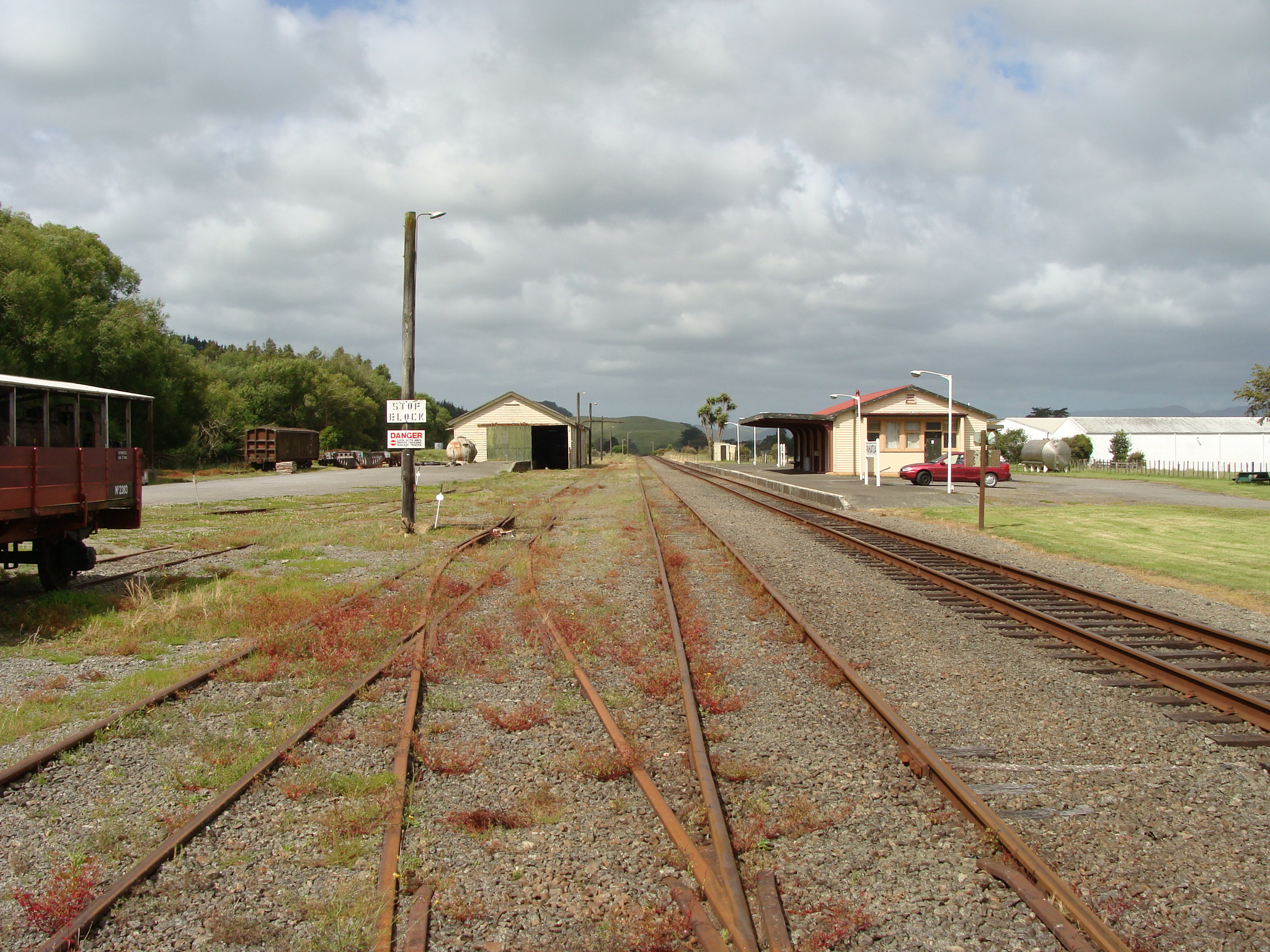

General information
- Location: Pahiatua – Mangahao Road; Tararua; New Zealand
- Coordinates: 40°26′42.12″S 175°48′54.42″E
- Elevation: 116 metres (381 ft)
- System: New Zealand Government Railways (NZGR); Regional rail
- Owner: KiwiRail
- Operator: Pahiatua Railcar Society (lessee)
- Line: Wairarapa Line
- Distance: 154.62 kilometres (96.08 mi) from Wellington
- Platforms: Single side
- Tracks: Main line (1); Loops (2); Sidings
- Train operators: Pahiatua Railcar Society

Construction
- Structure type: at-grade
- Parking: Yes

Other information
- Classification: RHTNZ Category B building

History
- Opened: 3 May 1897
- Closed: 1 August 1988 (passengers); January 2009 (freight)
- Rebuilt: 31 March 1971
- Former names: Scarborough
Location
Notes
- Previous Station: Konini Station; Next Station: Mangatainoka Station

Pahiatua railway station is on the Wairarapa Line in New Zealand's North Island. It was opened in May 1897, shortly before the line was opened to Woodville in December of that year. The station is located in Mangamutu, 1.7 kilometres (1.1 mi) west of Pahiatua, in contrast to the original plans for the railway line to run through the town.

As Pahiatua is one of the more significant towns in the northern Wairarapa, the station was for many years one of the few staffed stations on the northern section of the line. Though passenger traffic ceased in 1988, the station continues to be the source of freight traffic thanks to the neighbouring dairy factory, and it is also the home of the Pahiatua Railcar Society.

== History ==
=== Operation ===
==== 1897–1908 ====
When the station opened, Pahiatua was served by mixed trains that had were extended as the railway made its way north. These trains provided the only passenger services to Pahiatua for the few months it took to complete the line through to Woodville.

At the time the Wairarapa Line was completed, the Wellington – Longburn line was owned and operated by the private Wellington and Manawatu Railway Company, meaning all government trains from Wellington ran via the Wairarapa, giving a status of some importance to stations like Pahiatua. The popular Napier Mail was diverted from its original Napier – Palmerston North route to run via the Wairarapa to Wellington, and became the main passenger service stopping at Pahiatua, supplementing the mixed trains that continued to run. This situation continued until 1908, after when the Wairarapa Line reverted to secondary line status.

==== 1908–1988 ====
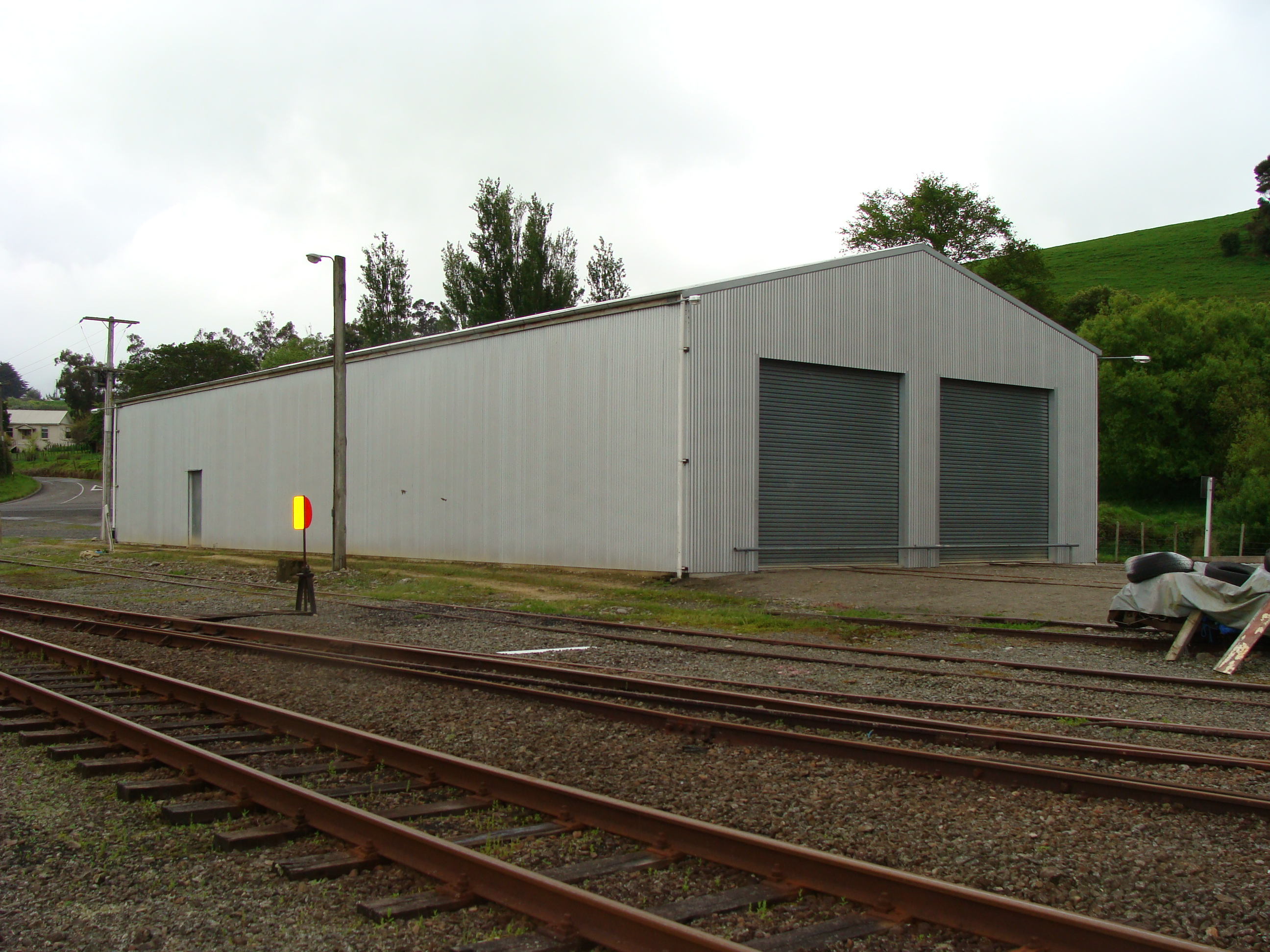
Pahiatua railway station Railcar Storage Shed and Workshop. This building was constructed by the Pahiatua Railcar Society and was completed in 2001.

The Wellington and Manawatu Railway was purchased by the government in 1908, which had an effect on services provided in the Wairarapa, particularly the section of the line north of Masterton. Because of the lengthy and costly delays associated with the operation of the Rimutaka Incline, much freight traffic from the northern Wairarapa region was diverted north through Woodville and Palmerston North to the Main Trunk Line to Wellington. Mixed trains, however, continued to operate through Pahiatua.

Shortly after the nationalisation of the WMR line, the Napier Express was diverted from the Wairarapa Line to run through the Manawatū Gorge and down the former WMR line to Wellington. Thereafter, the main passenger service to stop at Pahiatua was its replacement, the Wairarapa Mail. A new passenger service was provided from 1936 with the introduction of the Wairarapa-class railcars, which supplemented and later replaced the Wairarapa Mail in 1948. The Wairarapa railcars were replaced after the opening of the Rimutaka Tunnel in 1955 by 88-seater twinset railcars, which provided the main passenger service for Pahiatua for the next 22 years. The 1959 railcar timetable shows two north-bound and two south-bound railcar services stopping daily, with a third service on Fridays. During the railcar period, locomotive-hauled carriage trains were occasionally provided when demand exceeded the capacity of the railcars, and replaced railcar services altogether in 1977.

After the railcar services were withdrawn, patronage of passenger services on the northern section of the Wairarapa Line gradually declined. Demand finally reached a point where the service was no longer economical, and the Palmerston North – Masterton – Wellington and return service was withdrawn from 1 August 1988. This move led to the closure of Pahiatua station to passengers, though it remained open for goods traffic.

=== Facilities ===
==== Original station: 1897 ====
The Engineer-in-Chief of the Public Works Department reported in his annual statement of 31 March 1896 that the formation of the Wairarapa Line between Newman and Woodville was nearly complete. A little more than a year later, on 3 May 1897, Pahiatua station was opened (it is not recorded whether any special ceremony or celebration was held to mark the occasion) with the Newman – Pahiatua section. Pahiatua was not long the terminus, as the section from Pahiatua to Mangatainoka opened on 2 August, and to Woodville on 11 December.

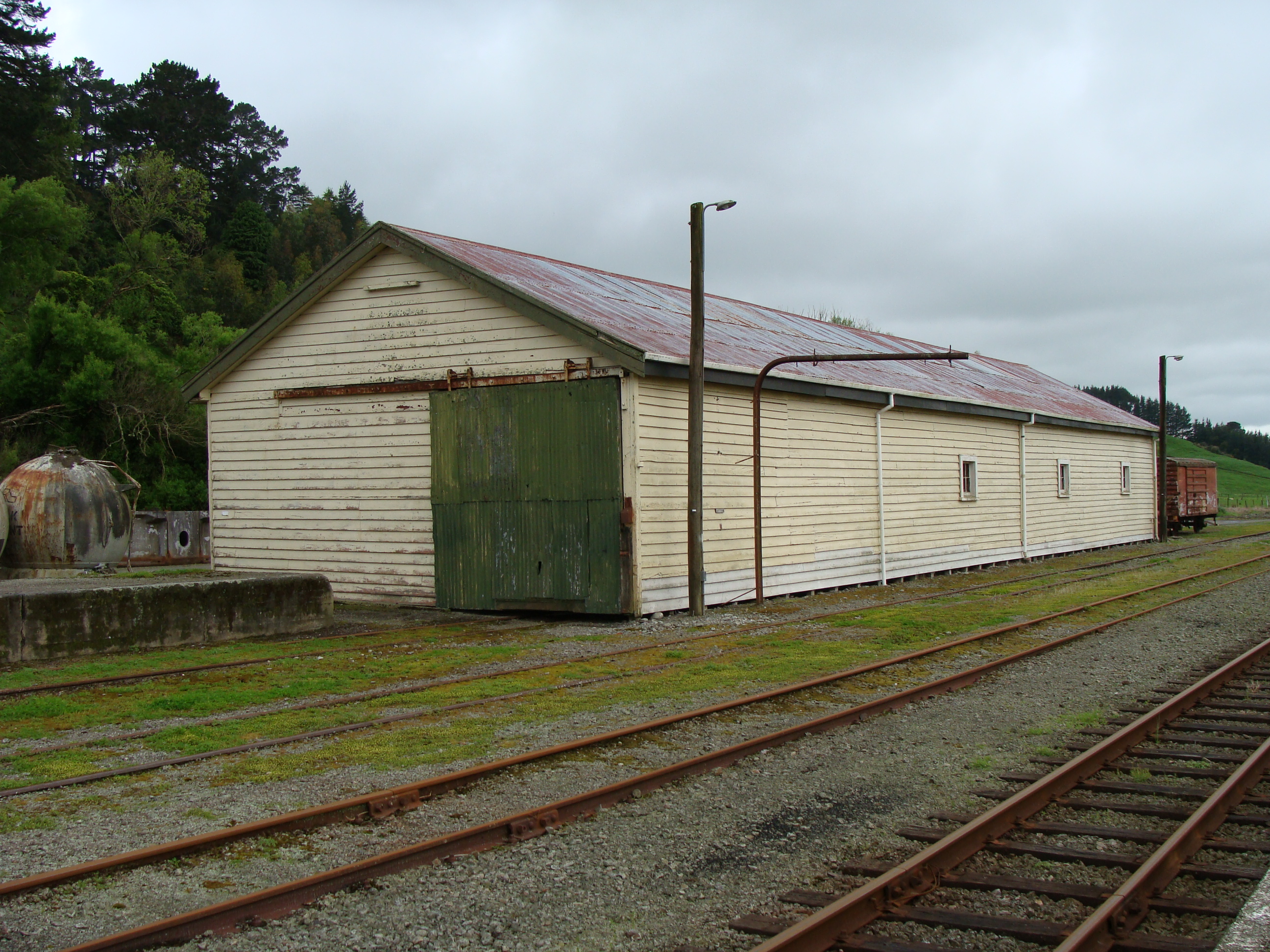
Pahiatua railway station goods shed and loading bank. This is the only surviving original building on site, and was completed in 1897.

The original station building was the standard ("Special") Class 2 design using wood and corrugated iron as building materials, as was common for stations serving towns similar to Pahiatua at the time. Facilities included a station building, platform, "cart-road to passenger platform", a 60-by-30-foot (18.3 by 9.1 m) goods shed, a loading bank, a crane, and cattle yards. The station building contained a ticket office and counter, a waiting room, a station master's office, general staff office and amenities, and public amenities. A stationmaster's house was also provided. A platform veranda was constructed in September 1900, and telegraph facilities were added in 1912.

The station was for many years without an adequate water supply, prompting the stationmaster to report on 10 February 1949 that there was nothing to fight fires with and to request that the locomotive water vats be modified so they could be used by the fire brigade if necessary. The public amenities were also considered to be inadequate, but it was not until the station was replaced that modern ablution facilities were provided.

Alterations were made to the station building as changing requirements necessitated them. However, insufficient attention seems to have been paid to routine maintenance, and action was often taken in response to complaints from the public. In 1957 a remodelling plan was proposed, which was expected to remedy all of the major maintenance issues at a cost of £2530. It was not until 1963 that money was set aside for the renovations in the working estimates, by which time the District Engineer was in favour of replacing the building. The old station building was painted, and it was planned to set aside money for the new building in the 1967 working estimates.

==== Replacement station: 1971 ====
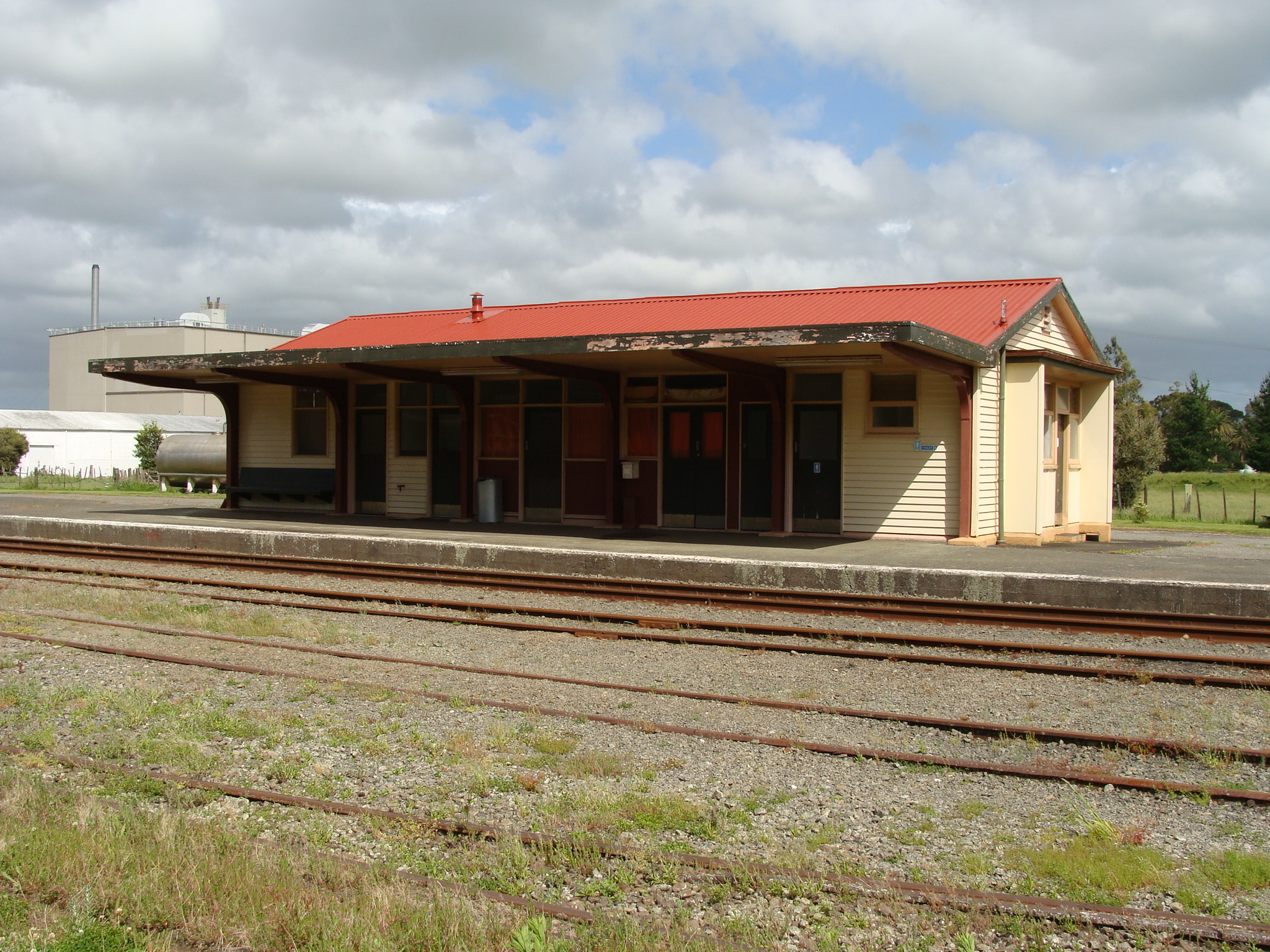
Pahiatua's replacement station building, opened in 1971.

The new railway station was completed by Railways staff at a cost of $20,000 in 1971. The building, on concrete foundations, had weatherboard cladding and an aluminium roof, and contained a general office, stationmaster's office, a waiting room, booking office, and public amenities in 1,200 square feet (110 m^{2}) of space. The platform and yard fences were replaced as part of the project. It was expected that a new goods shed and loading shelter would be added in the future. The signals and communications equipment was housed in a separate building. This was one of the last wooden station buildings of its type erected by the Railways Department before it switched to more modern materials.

Arrangements were made in January and February for the official opening ceremony, for which the dates of 10 March and 17 March were initially proposed. The Ways and Works Branch were requested to have the old station building removed and the site tidied up prior to this time. The date of the ceremony was later moved to 31 March, and members of the public were invited to attend.

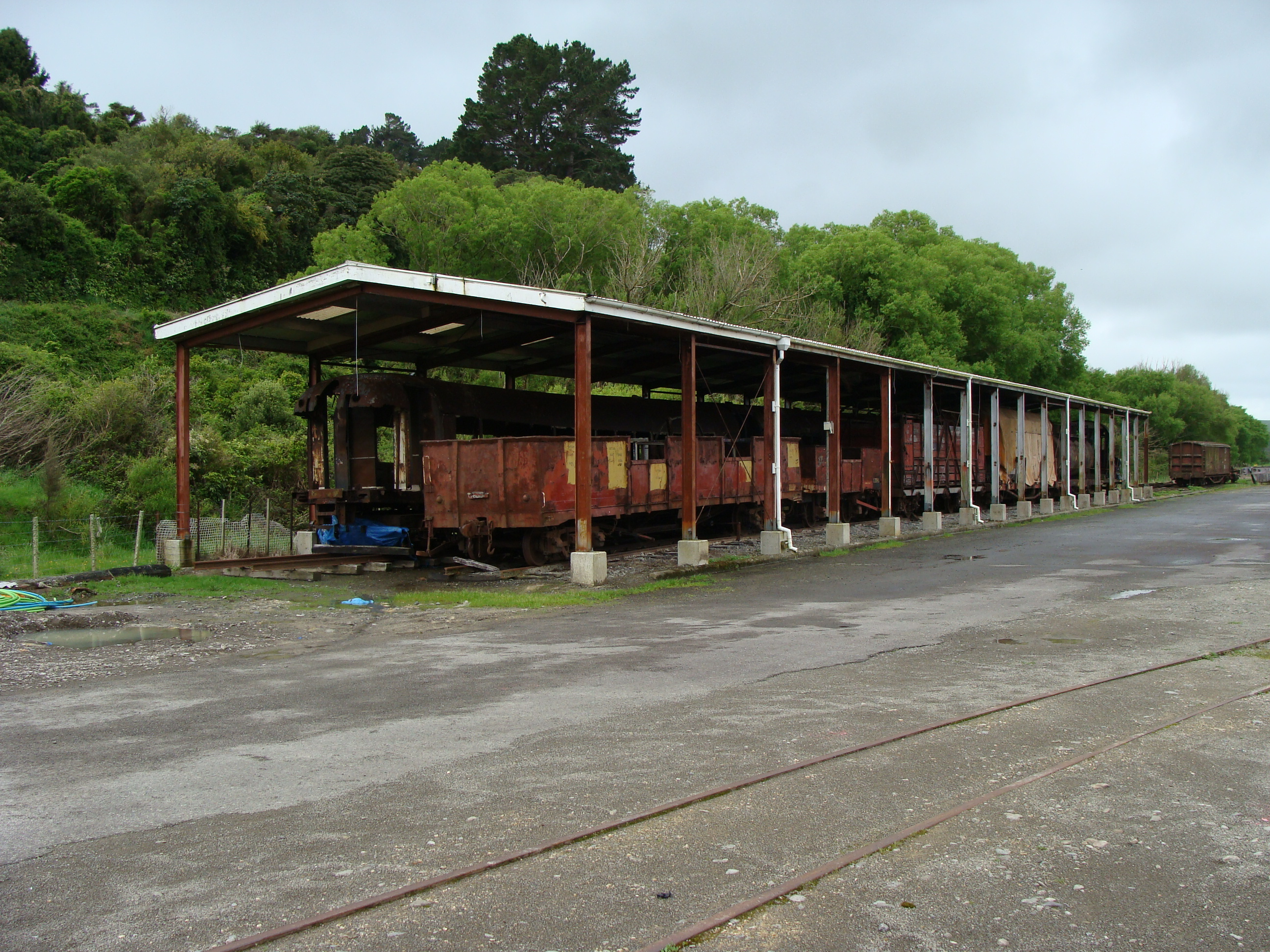
Pahiatua railway station Rolling Stock Storage Shelter. This building was moved to the station precinct in June 2002.

Prime Minister Sir Keith Holyoake officially opened the station, with around 100 guests and members of the public in attendance. Special guests included Colonel W. R. Burge, son of Pahiatua's first stationmaster; past station masters, including J. Weston; W. W. Day, chairman of the Pahiatua County Council; T. M. Small, Deputy General Manager of the Railways; and the mayor, J. L. Terry. A bronze plaque had been ordered to mark the occasion, which was unveiled by the Prime Minister, and read:

THIS BUILDING WAS OPENED
BY THE
PRIME MINISTER,
RT. HON. SIR KEITH HOLYOAKE, G.C.M.G., C.H.,
MEMBER OF PARLIAMENT FOR PAHIATUA
ON
31 MARCH 1971

After the ceremony, the official party and invited guests repaired to the Club Hotel for afternoon tea.

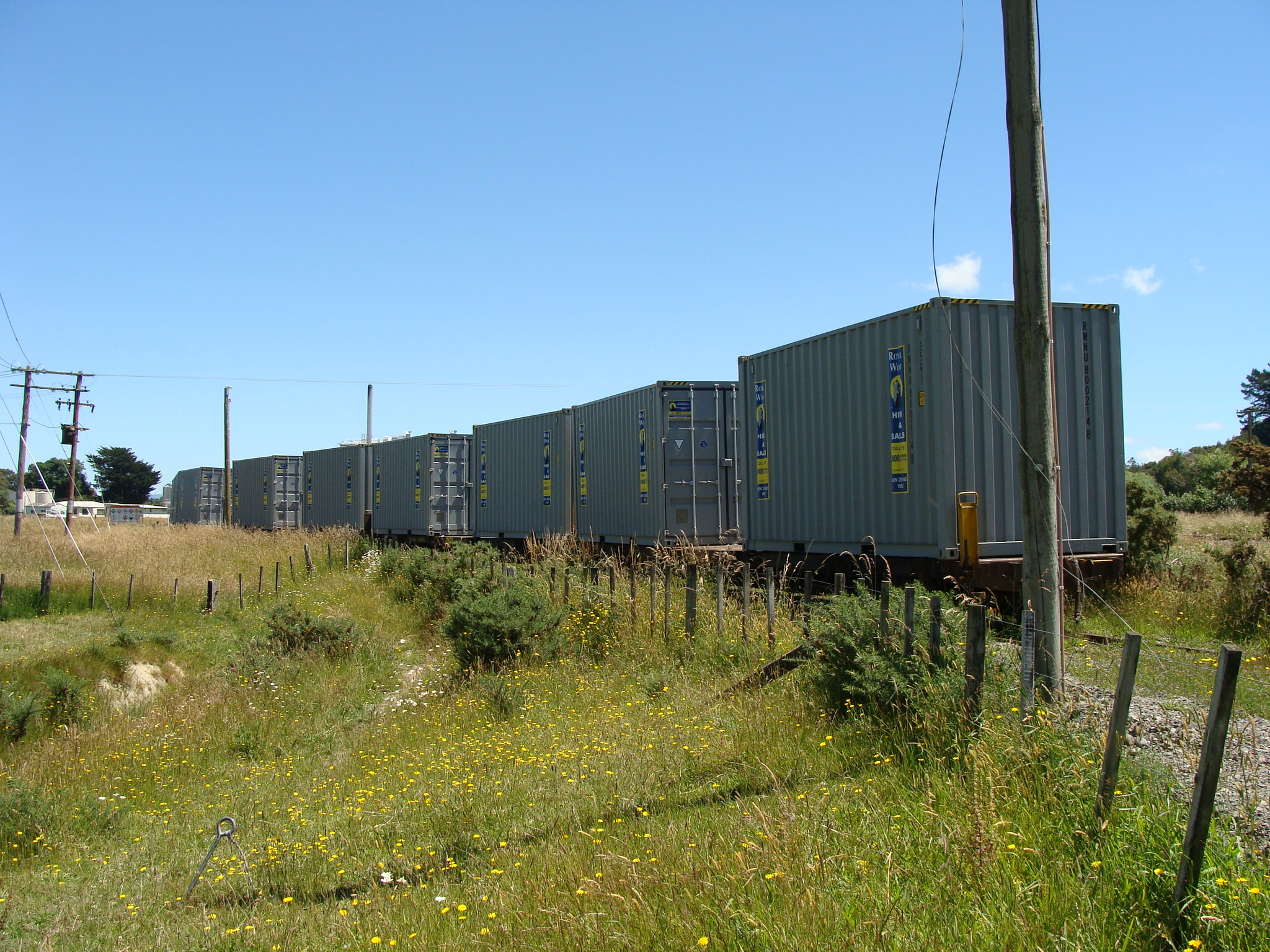
Wagons waiting to be collected from the Fonterra dairy factory siding, just north of Pahiatua railway station.

== Today ==
Pahiatua is the only operational station between Masterton and Woodville. As well as being the base of operations for the Pahiatua Railcar Society and the premises from which they operate their railway museum, it is used as required to marshal freight trains when wagons are collected from the neighbouring dairy factory. The station is owned by KiwiRail, with the Pahiatua Railcar Society being a lessee.

Several facilities have been retained or added at the site, both original and more modern. The 1971 station building remains, as does the original goods shed. The railcar society has erected its own buildings to support its various functions, including a Railcar Storage Shed and Workshop (2001), and a Rolling Stock Storage Shelter (June 2002). As well as the mainline, there are two loops and several sidings serving the railcar shed, goods shed and rolling stock storage shelter.

For seven years from 27 November 1988, the northern section of the Wairarapa Line was effectively mothballed, with no trains scheduled through Pahiatua. Congestion on the Wellington – Palmerston North section of the NIMT led to the rescheduling of the Wellington – Napier freight services to run via the Wairarapa from 14 August 1995. Following the daylighting of Tunnels 3, 4, 5 on the Palmerston North - Gisborne Line in the third quarter of 2008, and thus the removal of the impediment to running hi-cube containers through the Manawatū Gorge, the Wellington – Napier freight services were diverted to their original route from late 2008.

With the completion of an upgrade at Fonterra's Mangamutu Dairy Factory, including the installation of a new milk powder drier and railway siding, trains will no longer be required to transport milk from Pahiatua to Fonterra's Hawera facility for further processing. However, trains will still be used to transport the processed dairy product.

== See also ==
- Pahiatua Railcar Society
