= Ngawapurua railway station =

Defunct railway station in New Zealand

Ngawapurua

General information
- Location: New Zealand
- Coordinates: 40°22′50.6605″S 175°53′38.1916″E
- Elevation: 86 metres (282 ft)
- System: New Zealand Government Railways (NZGR); Regional rail
- Line: Wairarapa Line
- Distance: 163.89 kilometres (101.84 mi) from Wellington
- Platforms: Single side

Construction
- Structure type: at-grade
- Parking: No
- Architectural style: Vogel class 6

History
- Opened: 1 July 1897
- Closed: 29 May 1966
Location
Notes
- Previous Station: Mangatainoka Station; Next Station: Woodville Station

The Ngawapurua railway station on the Wairarapa Line was located in the Tararua District of the Manawatū-Whanganui region in New Zealand’s North Island.

Ngāawapūrua means in English "the blocked up river" or could also possibly mean "the meeting of the waters"

The station opened on 11 December 1897 and closed on 29 May 1966.

== Facilities ==
When originally opened Ngawapura station consisted of a 6th class station building & passenger platform on the main line with three loops in the goods yard, a 40 ft x 30 ft goods shed, loading bank, cattle yards & urinals. The back shunt to the cattle yards continued south to the river where ballast was collected for many years.

As roads in the area improved traffic at the station fell and it became one of several small stations on the line closed during the 1960s.
