= Pahiatua =

Town in Manawatū-Whanganui, New Zealand

Pahiatua Māori: Pahīatua
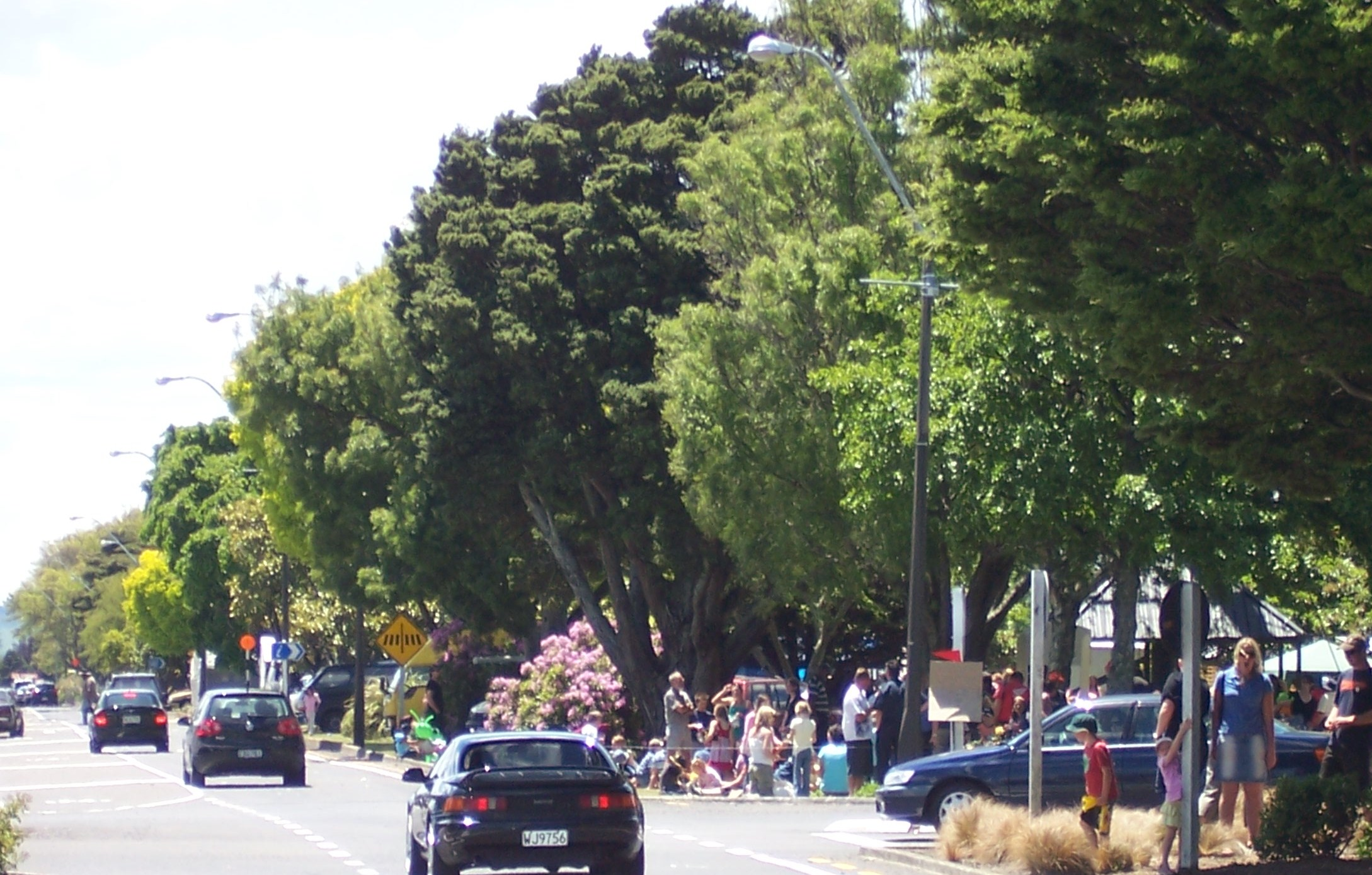
- Interactive map of Pahiatua
- Coordinates: 40°27′12″S 175°50′27″E
- Country: New Zealand
- Region: Manawatū-Whanganui
- Territorial authority: Tararua
- Ward: South Tararua General Ward; Tamaki nui-a Rua Maori Ward
- Founded: 1881
- Settled: 28 February 1882
- Incorporated (borough): 25 July 1892
- Founder: W. W. McCardle
- Electorates: Wairarapa; Ikaroa-Rāwhiti (Māori)

Government
  - Territorial Authority: Tararua District Council
  - Regional council: Horizons Regional Council
  - Tararua Mayor: Scott Gilmore
  - Wairarapa MP: Mike Butterick
  - Ikaroa-Rāwhiti MP: Cushla Tangaere-Manuel

Area
  - Total: 3.88 km^{2} (1.50 sq mi)
- Elevation: 103 m (338 ft)

Population (June 2025)
  - Total: 2,830
  - Density: 729/km^{2} (1,890/sq mi)
- Time zone: UTC+12 (NZST)
  - Summer (DST): UTC+13 (NZDT)
- Postcode(s): 4910
- Area code: 06

Pahiatua (Māori: Pahīatua) is a rural service town in the south-eastern North Island of New Zealand with a population of 2,830. It is between Masterton and Woodville on State Highway 2 and along the Wairarapa Line railway, 60 kilometres (37 mi) north of Masterton and 30 kilometres (19 mi) east of Palmerston North. It is usually regarded as being in the Northern Wairarapa. For local government purposes, since 1989 it has been in the Tararua District, which encompasses Eketāhuna, Pahiatua, Woodvillle, Dannevirke, Norsewood and the far east of the Manawatū-Whanganui region.

== History and culture ==
=== 19th century ===
The Wellington Land Board decided in December 1880 to offer land in the Pahiatua Block for settlement. This consisted of 12,000 acres (4,900 ha), of which 3,000 acres (1,200 ha) was offered on a deferred payment basis. Applications for the land closed in February the following year, but there seems to have been little interest at first. Sales of land from the original offer continued over the next few years.

The Pahiatua village was not a settlement initiated by the government, but rather one that had its origin in land speculation. Several subdivisions were established by private landholders including W. W. McCardle, H. Manns, A. W. and Henry Sedcole, and W. Wakeman. It is claimed that the first settlers were John Hall, who arrived on 28 February 1881, followed by John Hughes the next day. These men, plus the brothers of Hughes and their families, comprised Pahiatua's population the first summer. Precisely when the town of Pahiatua came into being is not clear, as it has not been established when McCardle's first land sale took place. However, by the summer of 1883 he was advertising grassed suburban sections, "improved" acres, and other unimproved lots. In November 1885, he sought to dispose of a large portion of one of his subdivisions at an auction in Napier.

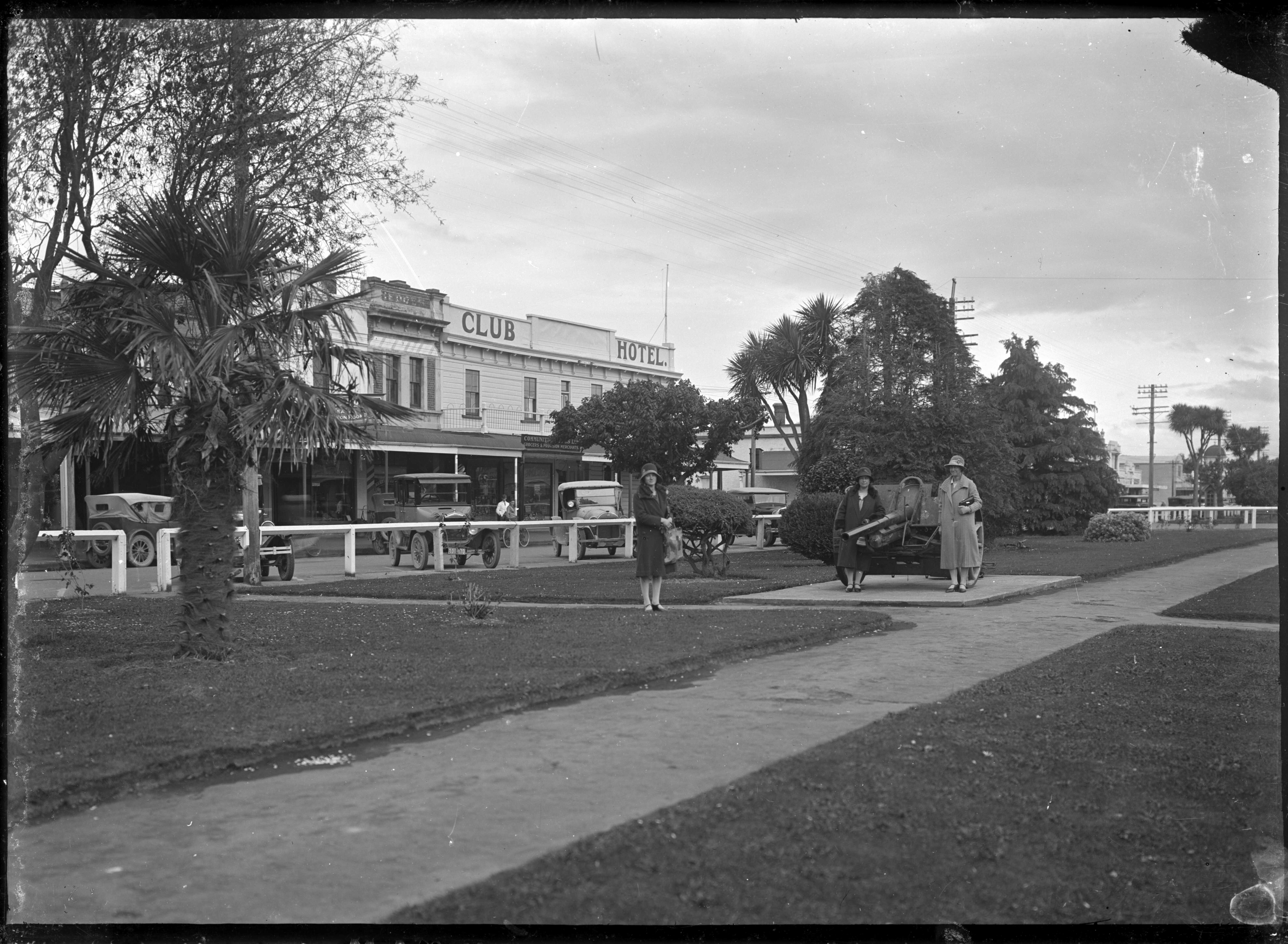
Main Street and the Club Hotel in 1929

Development of the land quickly produced results, and by August 1883, 5,000 acres (2,000 ha) had been cleared, several hundred heads of cattle were being grazed, and the population stood at 150. The efforts of the early settlers were sufficient to attract storekeepers and even a hotel.

The government belatedly decided to get involved and agreed to survey a township reserve in December 1882. They later changed their minds and postponed any decision, citing the need to wait for the final determination of the route of the railway. The settlers, also desirous of being close to the railway to improve land values, made strenuous efforts to have the line run through the town, but like their southern counterparts in Greytown, were ultimately unsuccessful. The legacy of this plan can be seen today in the unusual width of Pahiatua's Main Street, which was designed to accommodate the railway down the centre. The intended railway reserve became a grassed median after it was decided to build the railway line to the west of the town.

In 1981, Pahiatua celebrated its centennial with a weekend full of historical events, and in 2006 its 125th anniversary with a grand parade of 125 floats, vehicles and horses.

=== Naming of the town ===
The town was named by its founder, William Wilson McCardle. Pahiatua was already the name of the wider Pahiatua Block. When translated from Māori, Pahiatua can mean "god's resting place". The explanation accompanying this translation is that a chief fleeing from his enemies was led by his war god to this hill to seek refuge.

=== 20th century ===
Historical population counts show a steady increase in the size of the town throughout most of the 20th century.

Population	1886	1896	1906	1926	1945	1961	1975
Pahiatua	473	1158	1370	1477	1749	2578	2630

Pahiatua was the location of one of New Zealand's most powerful earthquakes when on 5 March 1934 a magnitude 7.6 quake struck at Horoeka. The 1934 Pahiatua earthquake was felt as far away as Auckland and Dunedin.

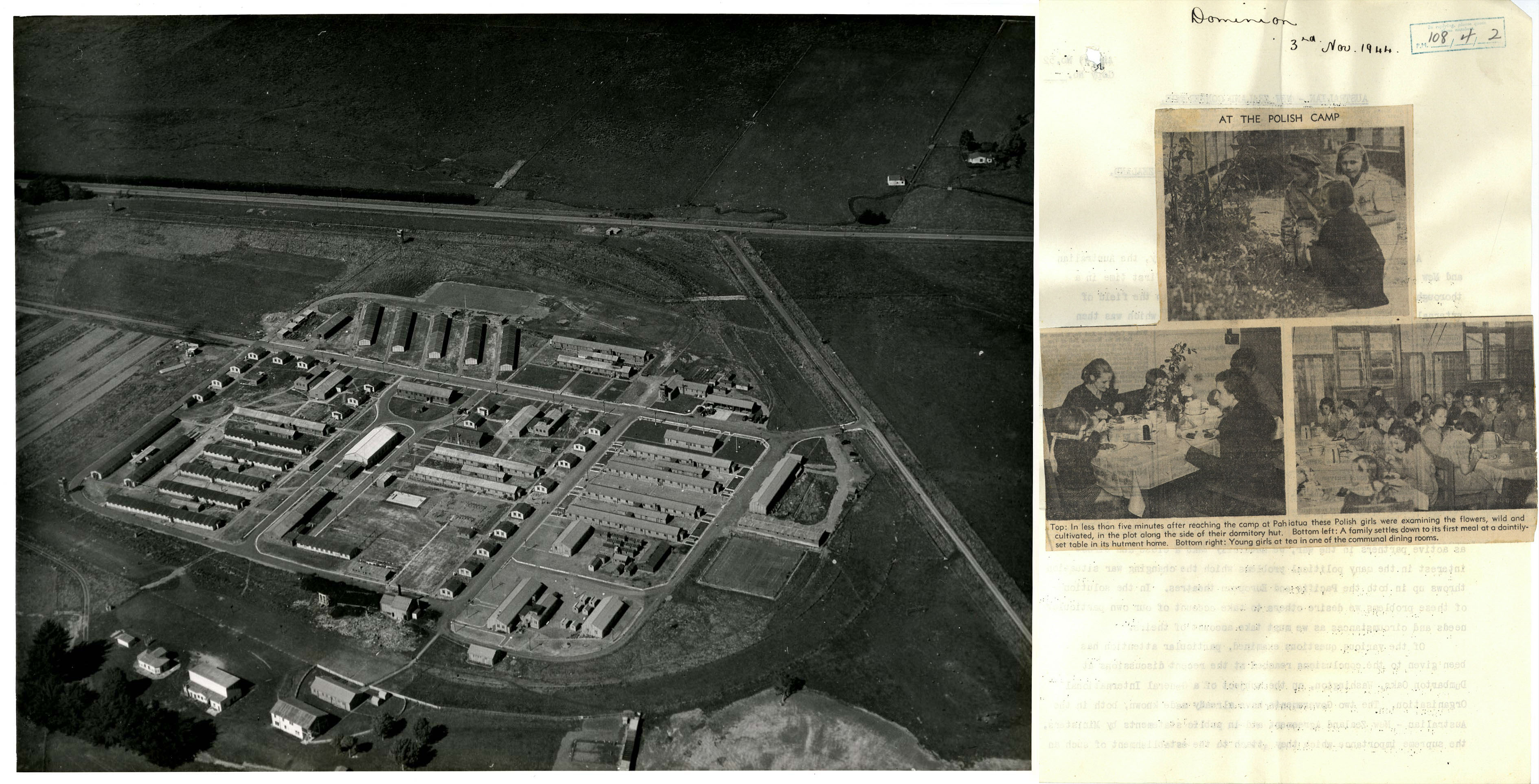
Formerly the racecourse, the camp in 1944

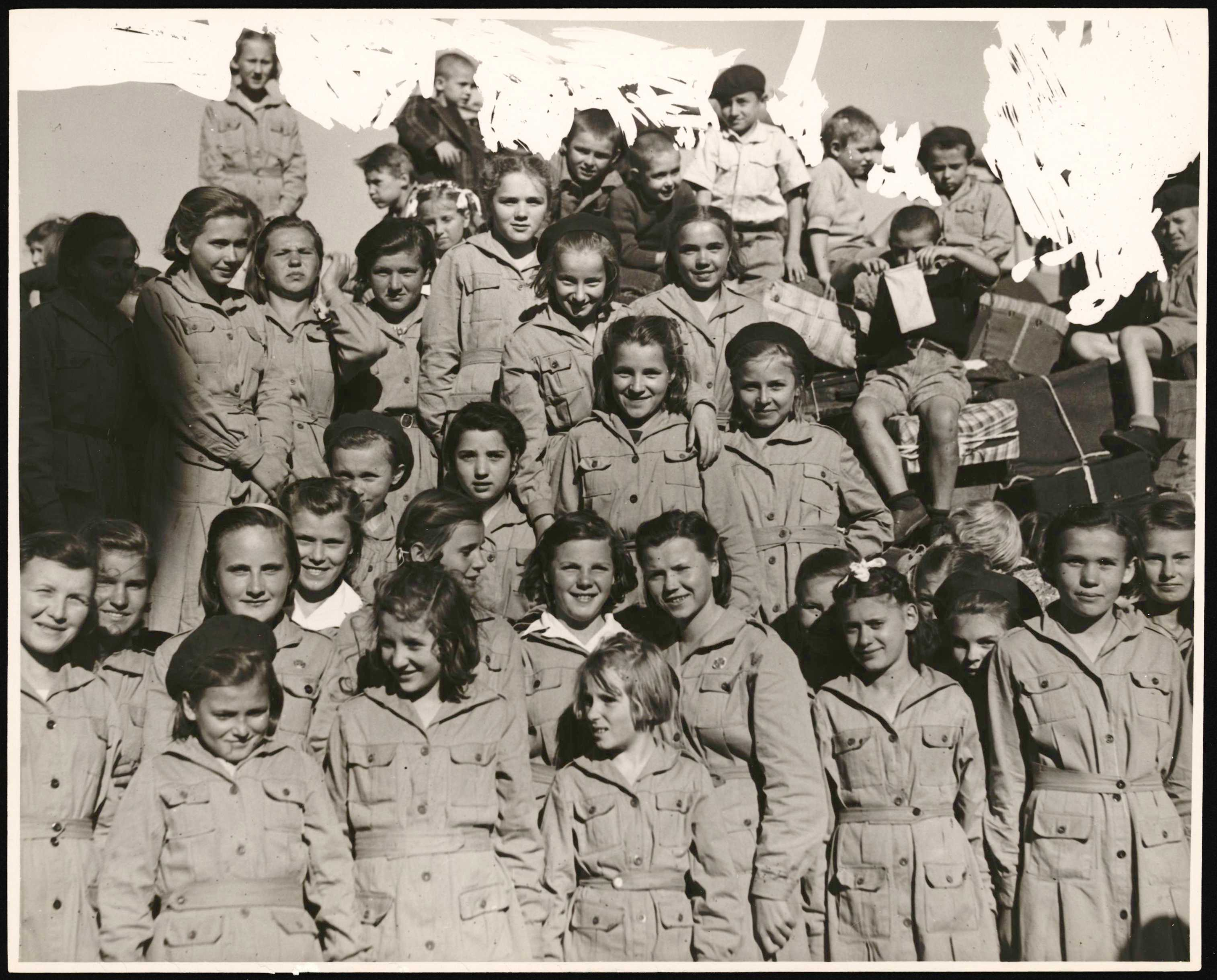
Polish refugees arriving at Wellington and at the Polish Children's Camp at Pahiatua, 1944

On 1 November 1944, 838 Polish refugees, of which 733 were children, were sent to a refugee camp about 2 kilometres (1.2 mi) south of the town. The camp had been used as an internment camp for foreigners at the start of World War II. The camp even had a Polish elementary school (until 1949) and a Polish gymnasium (until 1946). The settlement was expected to be a temporary measure, but with the occupation of Central Europe, including Poland, by the Soviet Union and its subsequent imposition of communist regimes after the end of the war, the refugees stayed on at the camp until 1949 at which point they were naturalised.

In 1951, the camp was used for over 900 refugees from Central and Eastern Europe.

In 2004, the New Zealand Polish community celebrated its 60th anniversary and the 65th anniversary celebrations were held in 2009 at which former Polish president Lech Wałęsa was to have been the guest of honour. The local museum opened a new exhibit in 2017 to tell the story of the refugees' experience in New Zealand.

=== 21st century ===
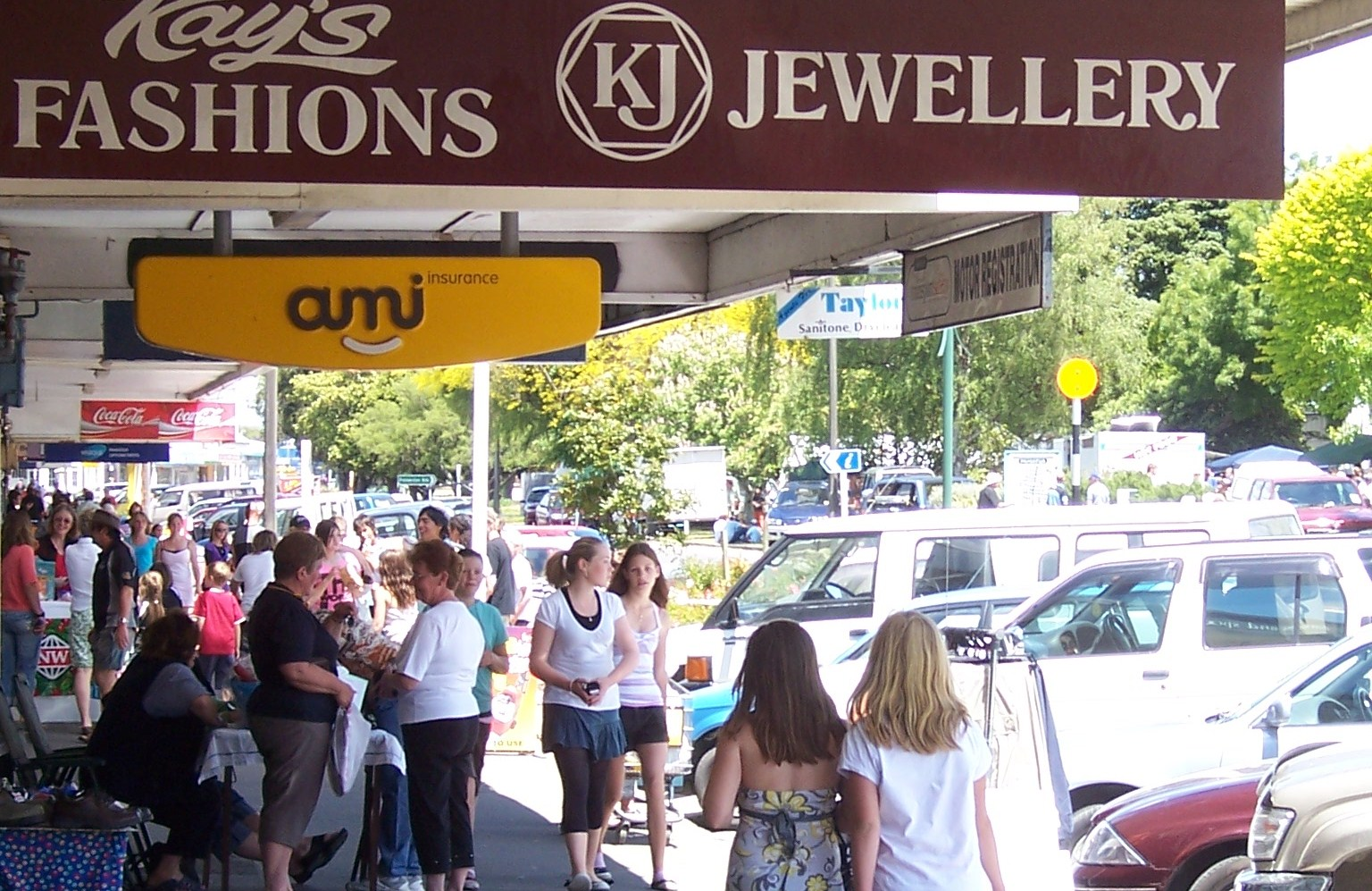
The 2007 Pahiatua Christmas Parade.

The estimated population of Pahiatua reached 2,760 in 1996, 2,660 in 2001, 2,547 in 2006, 2,403 in 2013, and 2,682 in 2018.

Average residential property prices increased 43% between 2005 and 2008.

== Geography ==
Pahiatua covers an area of 3.86 km², all of it land.

=== Climate ===
Climate data for Pahiatua (1991–2020 normals, extremes 1928–present)
Month	Jan	Feb	Mar	Apr	May	Jun	Jul	Aug	Sep	Oct	Nov	Dec	Year
Record high °C (°F)	32.8 (91.0)	32.2 (90.0)	33.0 (91.4)	28.1 (82.6)	23.5 (74.3)	20.1 (68.2)	19.4 (66.9)	19.1 (66.4)	22.3 (72.1)	25.2 (77.4)	27.9 (82.2)	29.9 (85.8)	33.0 (91.4)
Mean daily maximum °C (°F)	21.8 (71.2)	22.4 (72.3)	20.7 (69.3)	18.0 (64.4)	15.1 (59.2)	12.7 (54.9)	12.1 (53.8)	12.8 (55.0)	14.4 (57.9)	16.1 (61.0)	17.5 (63.5)	20.0 (68.0)	17.0 (62.5)
Daily mean °C (°F)	17.1 (62.8)	17.4 (63.3)	15.7 (60.3)	13.2 (55.8)	10.8 (51.4)	8.6 (47.5)	8.1 (46.6)	8.7 (47.7)	10.5 (50.9)	12.0 (53.6)	13.3 (55.9)	15.9 (60.6)	12.6 (54.7)
Mean daily minimum °C (°F)	12.3 (54.1)	12.3 (54.1)	10.7 (51.3)	8.4 (47.1)	6.5 (43.7)	4.6 (40.3)	4.0 (39.2)	4.6 (40.3)	6.5 (43.7)	7.8 (46.0)	9.1 (48.4)	11.7 (53.1)	8.2 (46.8)
Record low °C (°F)	0.4 (32.7)	−0.8 (30.6)	−2.0 (28.4)	−5.0 (23.0)	−6.2 (20.8)	−6.0 (21.2)	−6.1 (21.0)	−6.1 (21.0)	−5.0 (23.0)	−2.9 (26.8)	−3.7 (25.3)	−0.2 (31.6)	−6.2 (20.8)
Average rainfall mm (inches)	95.9 (3.78)	115.1 (4.53)	78.2 (3.08)	91.1 (3.59)	113.4 (4.46)	149.8 (5.90)	123.5 (4.86)	116.0 (4.57)	136.2 (5.36)	144.8 (5.70)	159.6 (6.28)	125.9 (4.96)	1,449.5 (57.07)
Source: NIWA (rain 1981–2010)

== Amenities ==
=== Marae ===
Pahiatua Marae, featuring Te Kohanga Whakawhaiti meeting house, is a traditional meeting place for Rangitāne and its Ngāti Hāmua and Te Kapuārangi sub-tribes. It includes Te Kohanga Whakawhaiti wharenui (meeting house).

=== Museums ===
Pahiatua & Districts Museum opened in 1977.

Pahiatua Railcar Society has been operating since 1991.

== Demographics ==
Stats NZ describes Pahiatua as a small urban area, which covers 3.88 km^{2} (1.50 sq mi). It had an estimated population of 2,830 as of June 2025, with a population density of 729 people per km^{2}.

Historical population
Year	Pop.	±% p.a.
2006	2,547	—
2013	2,403	−0.83%
2018	2,682	+2.22%
2023	2,838	+1.14%

Pahiatua had a population of 2,838 in the 2023 New Zealand census, an increase of 156 people (5.8%) since the 2018 census, and an increase of 435 people (18.1%) since the 2013 census. There were 1,353 males, 1,479 females, and 6 people of other genders in 1,098 dwellings. 2.2% of people identified as LGBTIQ+. The median age was 39.4 years (compared with 38.1 years nationally). There were 624 people (22.0%) aged under 15 years, 447 (15.8%) aged 15 to 29, 1,179 (41.5%) aged 30 to 64, and 591 (20.8%) aged 65 or older.

People could identify as more than one ethnicity. The results were 86.9% European (Pākehā); 27.2% Māori; 3.3% Pasifika; 2.9% Asian; 0.8% Middle Eastern, Latin American and African New Zealanders (MELAA); and 2.3% other, which includes people giving their ethnicity as "New Zealander". English was spoken by 97.3%, Māori by 4.1%, Samoan by 0.5%, and other languages by 4.1%. No language could be spoken by 2.4% (e.g. too young to talk). New Zealand Sign Language was known by 0.6%. The percentage of people born overseas was 10.0, compared with 28.8% nationally.

Religious affiliations were 35.0% Christian, 0.2% Hindu, 0.7% Islam, 2.2% Māori religious beliefs, 0.1% Buddhist, 0.6% New Age, and 0.8% other religions. People who answered that they had no religion were 52.0%, and 8.8% of people did not answer the census question.

Of those at least 15 years old, 267 (12.1%) people had a bachelor's or higher degree, 1,284 (58.0%) had a post-high school certificate or diploma, and 666 (30.1%) people exclusively held high school qualifications. The median income was $31,100, compared with $41,500 nationally. 132 people (6.0%) earned over $100,000 compared to 12.1% nationally. The employment status of those at least 15 was 960 (43.4%) full-time, 267 (12.1%) part-time, and 60 (2.7%) unemployed.

== Economy ==
The economy is based on support for sheep and beef farming and the dairy industry, with the Fonterra Dairy factory in Mangamutu and Tui Brewery in Mangatainoka, both located just outside the town. Other major employers include Betacraft and Sweet Foods, located in the town itself.

In 2018, 16.9% of the workforce worked in manufacturing, 5.8% worked in construction, 5.0% worked in hospitality, 3.4% worked in transport, 7.9% worked in education, and 9.8% worked in healthcare.

== Government ==
The residents of Pahiatua were politically active from early on, advocating for their own Roads Board around June 1883. By August 1886, Pahiatua had gained town district status and only two years later, in October 1888, the Pahiatua County Council was established. The town was constituted as a borough on 25 July 1892. The council remained the political master of the town and surrounding area until the local government reforms of 1989 merged the town into the Tararua District Council.

At central government level, Pahiatua was located in the Wairarapa seat until 1881, at which point the electorate was split into Wairarapa North and Wairarapa South (later to become Masterton and Wairarapa respectively in 1887). Part of the Masterton seat was divided off into the new Pahiatua seat in 1896, which remained the political home of Pahiatua until the electorate was amalgamated with the Wairarapa seat in 1996.

The settlement is now part of Tararua District (led by mayor Scott Gilmore), the Wairarapa electorate (represented by Mike Butterick) and Ikaroa-Rāwhiti electorate (represented by Cushla Tangaere-Manuel).

== Transportation ==
As of 2018, among those who commute to work, 71.0% drove a car, 4.7% rode in a car, 2.9% use a bike, and 2.9% walk or run. No one commuted by public transport.

The town's public transport now consists of a single trip from Tuesday to Friday and on Sunday Masterton – Palmerston North and return bus service (with an extra service on Fridays) run by Tranzit Coachlines.

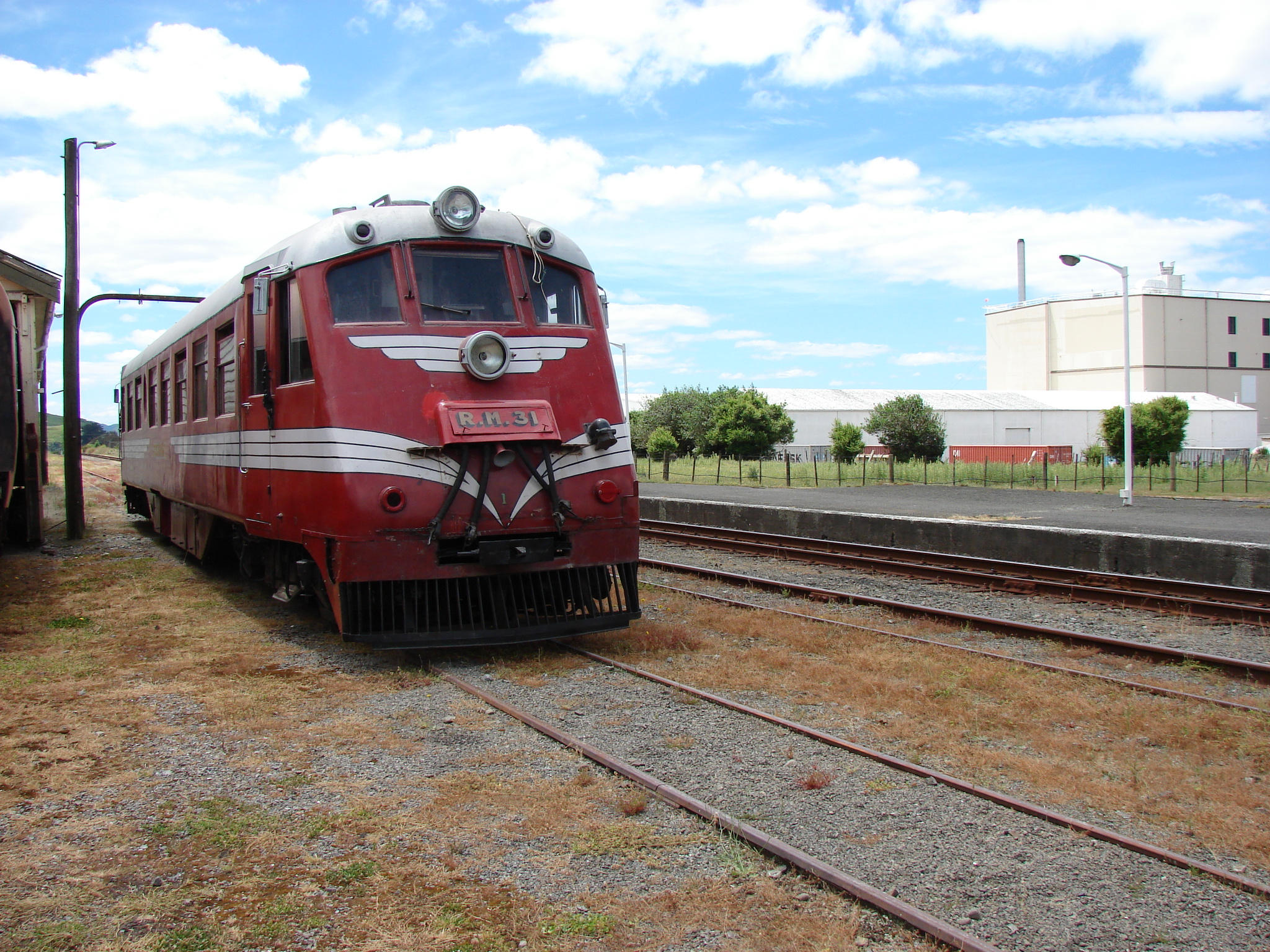
RM 31 (Tokomaru) going for a run through the Pahiatua station yard.

An electric tramway system was considered for Pahiatua, but never constructed.

Rail transport to Pahiatua was available from 3 May 1897 when the town's railway station opened, marking the completion of the Wairarapa Line as far north as the town. The line was completed through to Pahiatua's northern neighbour, Woodville, several months later, on 11 December 1897. Improvements made to the region's road network in the latter half of the 20th century led to a decline in the popularity of rail for public transport. The service was finally withdrawn in 1988 when the last passenger train between Palmerston North and Masterton stopped at Pahiatua on Friday, 29 July.

Pahiatua is the home of the Pahiatua Railcar Society, a non-profit railway heritage organisation based at the town's railway station, whose purpose is to preserve and restore to working order railcars formerly in revenue service on New Zealand's railway network. Some of the notable vehicles in their collection include a Standard class railcar (RM31), a Wairarapa class railcar (RM5), and a Twin Set railcar (RM121). The society leases the railway station from KiwiRail and opens their museum to the public once a month.

== Healthcare ==
Pahiatua had its own hospital, located on a site at the southern end of the town, since 1902. In November 1997, the hospital, then under the jurisdiction of Palmerston North-based Mid Central Health, was informed that it would soon close as the Health Funding Authority could no longer afford to keep it open. This was despite numerous assurances given to the town from 1992 by successive health authorities that the hospital was in no danger of being closed. The closure date was set at 30 June 1998, by which time the only services offered by the hospital were an x-ray department, maternity, a general ward, and geriatric, palliative, convalescent, and rehabilitation care. However, part of the complex remained open until the last patients could be relocated to a new facility at Waireka Home that was still under construction.

Following the closure of the hospital in 1998, hospital-level care has been provided at Palmerston North hospital as the town is in the jurisdiction of Mid Central Health.

Also, after the closing of the town's hospital was the establishment of the Pahiatua Medical Centre, which now dispenses general practice health care to the town's residents and, via outreach clinics, to residents of Eketahuna and Woodville. It is run by the Tararua PHO (Primary Health Organisation).

The old Pahiatua hospital complex was refurbished and converted into a private conference and accommodation business called Masters Hall. It was put up for sale in 2025.

Primary healthcare services for the town are provided by the Tararua Health Group.

== Communications ==
The area code for Pahiatua is 06 as for telecommunications purposes it is part of the Manawatu-Wairarapa-Hawkes Bay region in the lower North Island. Local numbers generally begin with 376, with the next digit being 0, 6, 7 or 8.

The Tararua District Council formed an alliance with the telecommunications companies Inspire Net, Inspired Networks, Digital Nation and FX Networks to link the four major towns in its jurisdiction to Palmerston North with a fibre optic cable. The link between Palmerston North and Pahiatua was expected to go live on 31 July 2008. The service is now available to some rural residents and urban customers. As of 2023, fibre internet is available to customers in Pahiatua after extensive infrastructure updates were made by Chorus.

Tararua College is one of 14 schools nationwide set to become the first to benefit from the government's broadband in schools initiative. Funding of $34 million has been allocated for the programme, of which the schools will receive $5 million for upgrades to their information technology equipment.

=== Media ===
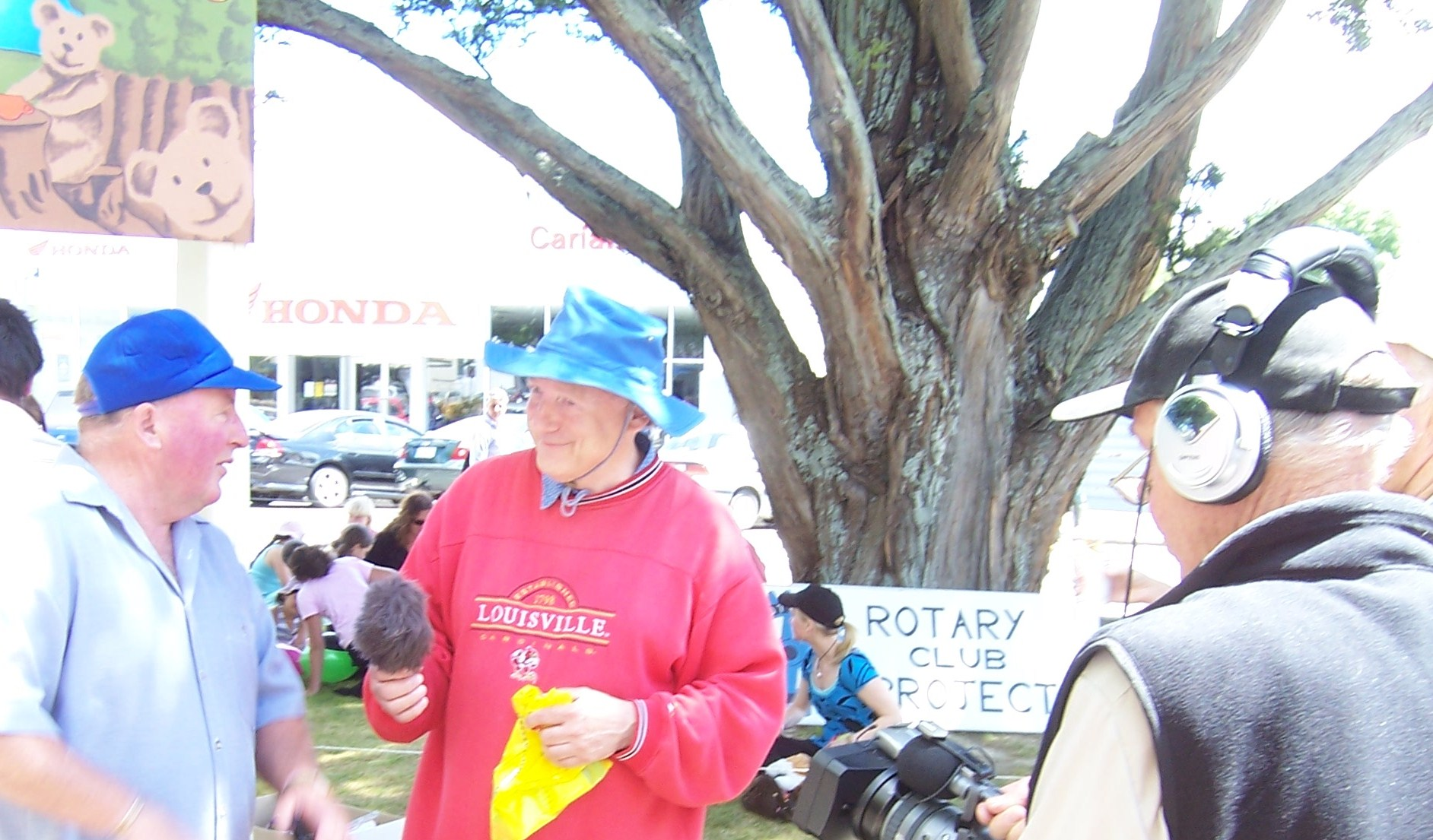
Local TV station "Tararua TV" filming at the 2007 Christmas Market day.

Free-to-air television broadcasts are available in Pahiatua, including the major national channels offered by TVNZ and Prime from Sky Television. Also available is digital television from both Sky Television (via satellite) and Freeview (either via UHF terrestrial broadcasts or by satellite).

Pahiatua is the home of the regional television station Tararua Television. The founders Hart Udy and Jonathan McLean had a vision to broadcast free-to-air family-friendly television programs, and the vision came to life. The channel began in a studio at Tararua College in 2004 and officially opened by Martin Matthews, CEO of Culture and Heritage. The studio then moved to Pahiatua Christian Fellowship, where they produced their first live program, celebrating their first birthday. At that time, TTV was broadcasting to an audience of approximately 5,000 in Pahiatua and Woodville. A local fund-raising effort enabled the station to increase its coverage to Palmerston North, Foxton, Bulls, Marton, Feilding and Ashhurst and a ceremony to mark the occasion was held on 1 May 2008.

With the switch off of analogue television services within the Manawatu-Whanganui Region on 29 September 2013 and to ensure business continuity, Tararua Television has secured resource consent and licensing to broadcast on DTV27 via Freeview from its own stand-alone transmission site on Wharite capturing a potential primary audience exceeding 133,000 throughout the Manawatu-Whanganui Region predominantly in the Manawatu, Horowhenua, Rangitikei and Tararua districts. From small beginnings, Tararua Television continually strives to succeed and grow within an environment dominated by mainstream television and today is a force to be reckoned with. Locally owned and operated Tararua Television provides an alternative viewing platform of locally produced community-focused and family-safe television programmes from throughout the region that involve the community yet are non-judgmental. Tararua Television is a member of the Regional Broadcasters Association (RTB) and is the only regional television station between Nelson in the south to Hawke's Bay in the East and Central TV Matamata in the North.

When the Tararua District moved to digital TV transmission in 2013, the TTV directors reluctantly closed the Tararua Television station because of financial constraints.

== Education ==
Tararua College, a state secondary school for years 9 to 13, is located in Pahiatua. It was established in 1960, and has a roll of 383.

Pahiatua School is a state primary school for years 1 to 8, with a roll of 331. It opened in 1885. In 1904 it included secondary education to became a District High School. When Tararua College open in 1960, it became a primary school again.

St Anthony's School is a state-integrated Catholic primary school for years 1 to 8, with a roll of 122. It opened in an Anglican church in 1906, and moved to its own premises in 1912. It split junior classes to a new site (the current location) in 1956, and the two sites merged in 1987. In 1982, the school became state-integrated.

All these schools are co-educational. Rolls are as of July 2026.

A consultation document proposing the reorganisation of educational facilities in the Tararua District was released by the Bush Education Plan working group in July 2009. Amongst its recommendations was the closure of several schools in the district, such as Hillcrest School, and for their rolls to be merged into other schools, such as Pahiatua School. The plan was scrapped a month later when the working group was dissolved after a vitriolic response from local residents and a statement from the Minister of Education that she had no plans to close any schools in the region against the wishes of the local community.

== Town facilities ==
Unusual for a town of its size, Pahiatua has retained several amenities that were lost to similar towns around New Zealand in the 1980s and 1990s, including banking, postal services and a cinema, the Regent Theatre.

Originally built by Kerridge Theatres NZ in 1940, the 600-seat Regent closed in 1977 and was purchased by the Pahiatua Repertory Society, who converted it into a 230-seat cinema in the upstairs area and a 220-seat live theatre facility in the downstairs area. At that time, the name was changed to Upstairs Downstairs Theatre. In 2001, an extensive restoration of the facade and foyer took place and the building's name reverted to the original name, the Regent. In 2015, the cinema converted from 35mm projection to a fully compliant DCI digital projection. Still owned by the Pahiatua Repertory Society, today it operates as two separate entities: The Pahiatua Upstairs Cinema Society (a registered charity) and the Pahiatua Repertory Society Incorporated (also a registered charity).

In 2021, Westpac Bank closed its Pahiatua branch, leaving the town with no full banking facilities. However, Kiwibank operates a banking agency at the NZ Post Shop at 91 Main Street, Pahiatua. The town is also served by a public swimming pool, an extensive sports complex, a supermarket, a Kohanga Reo, two kindergartens, an Early Childhood Centre, two primary schools, a secondary school, a volunteer fire brigade, and a public library.

The town has both a hotel and a motel.

== See also ==
- List of former territorial authorities in New Zealand
- Pahiatua (New Zealand electorate)
- Pahiatua Railcar Society
- Pahiatua Railway Station
- Wairarapa (New Zealand electorate)
