= Woodville railway station, Manawatū-Whanganui =

Railway station in New Zealand

Woodville
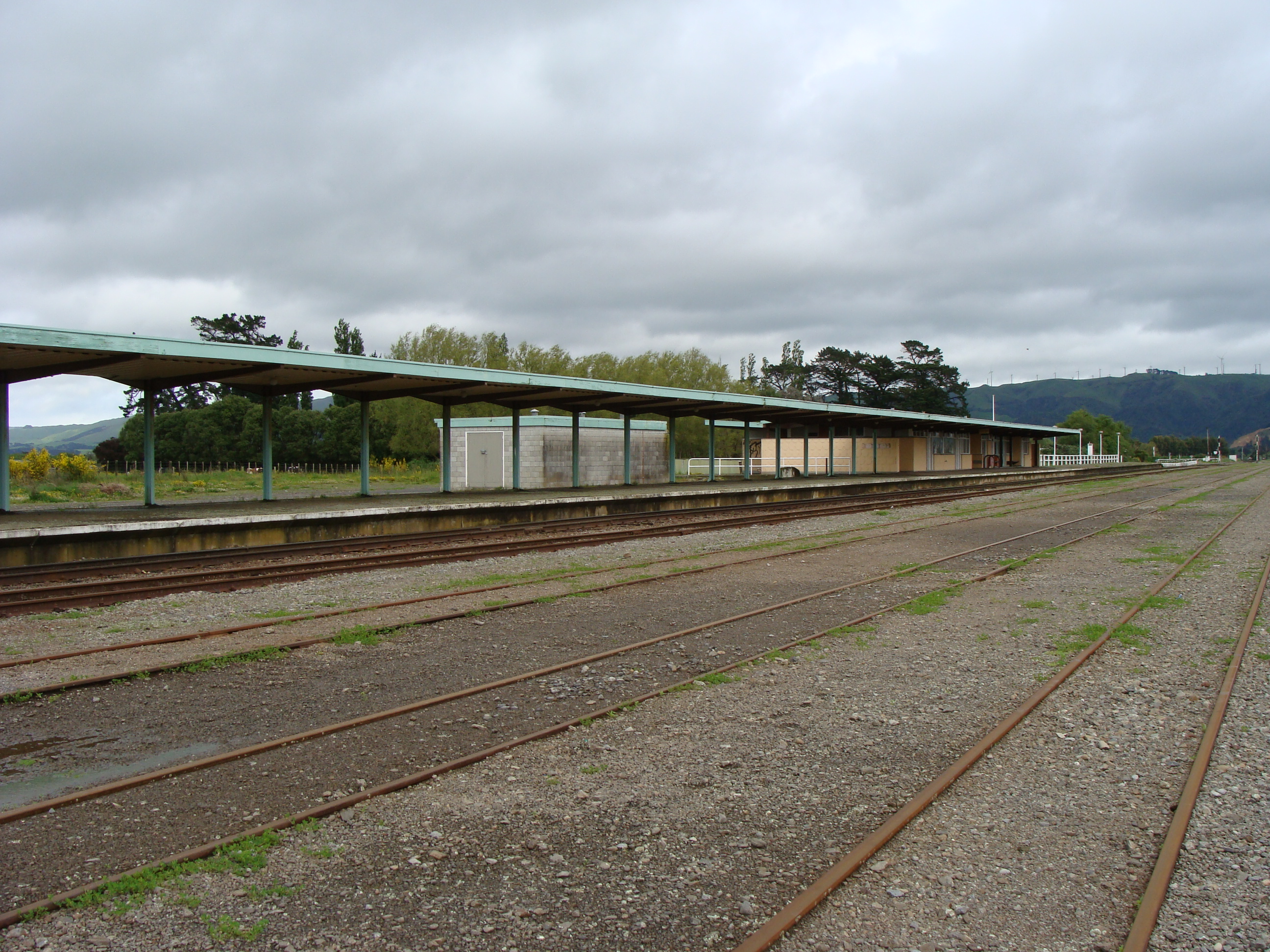
- Woodville railway station platform and building in 2008

General information
- Location: Station Street, Woodville, New Zealand
- Coordinates: 40°20′42″S 175°52′03″E
- Elevation: 77 metres (253 ft)
- System: New Zealand Government Railways (NZGR) regional rail
- Owner: KiwiRail
- Lines: Wairarapa Line; Palmerston North - Gisborne Line
- Platforms: Single (formerly split mainline and 2 dock)
- Tracks: Main line (1); Balloon loop (1); Loops (4); Goods sidings (2)

Construction
- Parking: Yes
- Cycle facilities: No

History
- Opened: 22 March 1887
- Closed: 7 October 2001 (passengers)
- Rebuilt: 1964
- Former names: Woodville Junction

Services
Preceding station	Historical railways	Following station
The Gorge; Line open, station closed 3 mi (4.8 km) towards PN	Palmerston North–Gisborne Line; KiwiRail	Papatawa; Line open, station closed 6.66 km (4.14 mi) towards Napier
Terminus	Wairarapa Line; KiwiRail	Ngawapurua; Line open, station closed 7.61 km (4.73 mi) towards Wellington
Location

Woodville railway station is the northern terminus of the Wairarapa Line and is located at the junction with the Palmerston North–Gisborne Line in the small Tararua town of Woodville, 27 km (17 mi) east of Palmerston North in New Zealand's North Island.

Woodville was the railhead of the line from Napier until the line was completed through the Manawatū Gorge, connecting it with Palmerston North in 1891. It was not until 1897 when the Wairarapa Line finally reached its northern terminus that Woodville again became a station of some importance, 10 years after it opened. As a junction, Woodville has hosted a variety of services from the Wairarapa, Manawatū, and Hawkes Bay regions, but has been closed to passenger services since 2001.

The station remains distinctive for its unique (to New Zealand) balloon loop track arrangement, which allows trains from Hawke's Bay direct access to the Wairarapa and vice versa without having to run the locomotive around the train. This means that trains from any direction can use the station, and the loop can also be used to turn locomotives when Woodville is the terminus of a journey.

== History ==
=== Operation ===
==== Early years: 1887–1897 ====
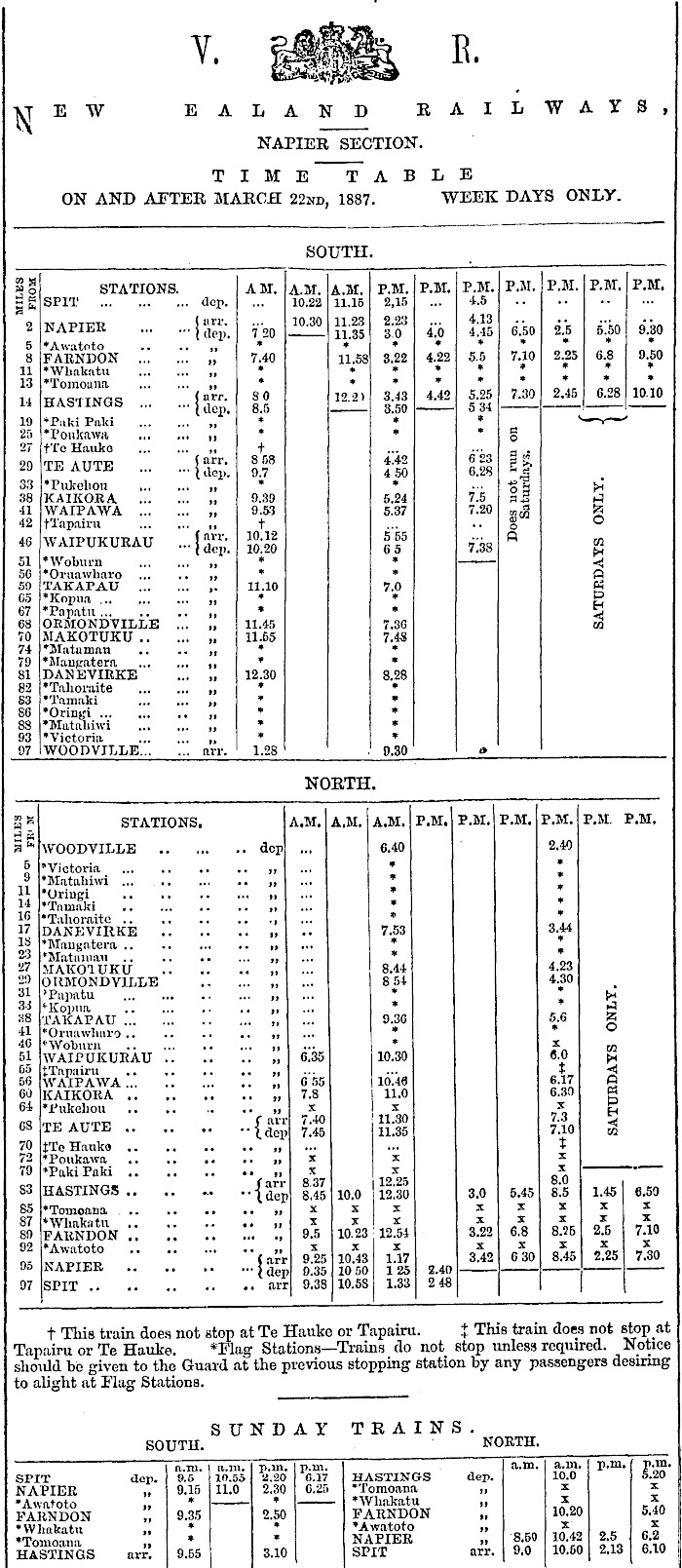
1887 timetable

Woodville was initially a station on the Palmerston North – Napier line that was constructed southwards from Napier in the 1880s. The railhead finally reached Woodville in 1887, with the first official train arriving on 22 March 1887. Woodville remained the terminus of the line over the next four years as it was extended through the Manawatū Gorge, finally reaching Palmerston North in March 1891.

Passenger services from Woodville west to Palmerston North and south into the Wairarapa were provided by private coach operators. The Wairarapa services connected Woodville to the railhead of the Wellington – Woodville railway, which for much of this time was located at Eketahuna. Those passengers travelling north from Woodville to the Hawkes Bay region were catered for by mixed train services, but following the completion of the line through to Palmerston North in 1891, the Napier Express service between Napier and Palmerston North via Woodville was inaugurated. It connected with services operated by the Wellington and Manawatu Railway company at Longburn to Wellington, allowing passengers to complete their journeys between the Hawkes Bay region and Wellington by train. Passenger excursions were also popular, with trips being made to destinations such as Napier, Waipawa, and Foxton.

==== Heyday: 1897–1908 ====
The connection of the Wellington – Woodville railway with the Palmerston North – Napier line at Woodville on 11 December 1897 ushered in a period of intense activity for Woodville station, as well as being a momentous occasion for the Railways Department. The government now had its own rail connection north from Wellington into the Manawatū and Hawkes Bay regions, which led to a significant increase in the amount of freight trafficked through Woodville.

The Napier Express passenger trains that used to terminate at Palmerston North were re-routed south from Woodville through the Wairarapa to terminate at Wellington following the completion of the Wairarapa Line. This change reflected the desire of the Railways Department to use its own lines where possible, and to avoid losing traffic to the Wellington and Manawatu Railway Company. However, the move proved to be unpopular, as the journey time increased by an hour due to the operational requirements of the Rimutaka Incline.

==== Halcyon years: 1908–2001 ====
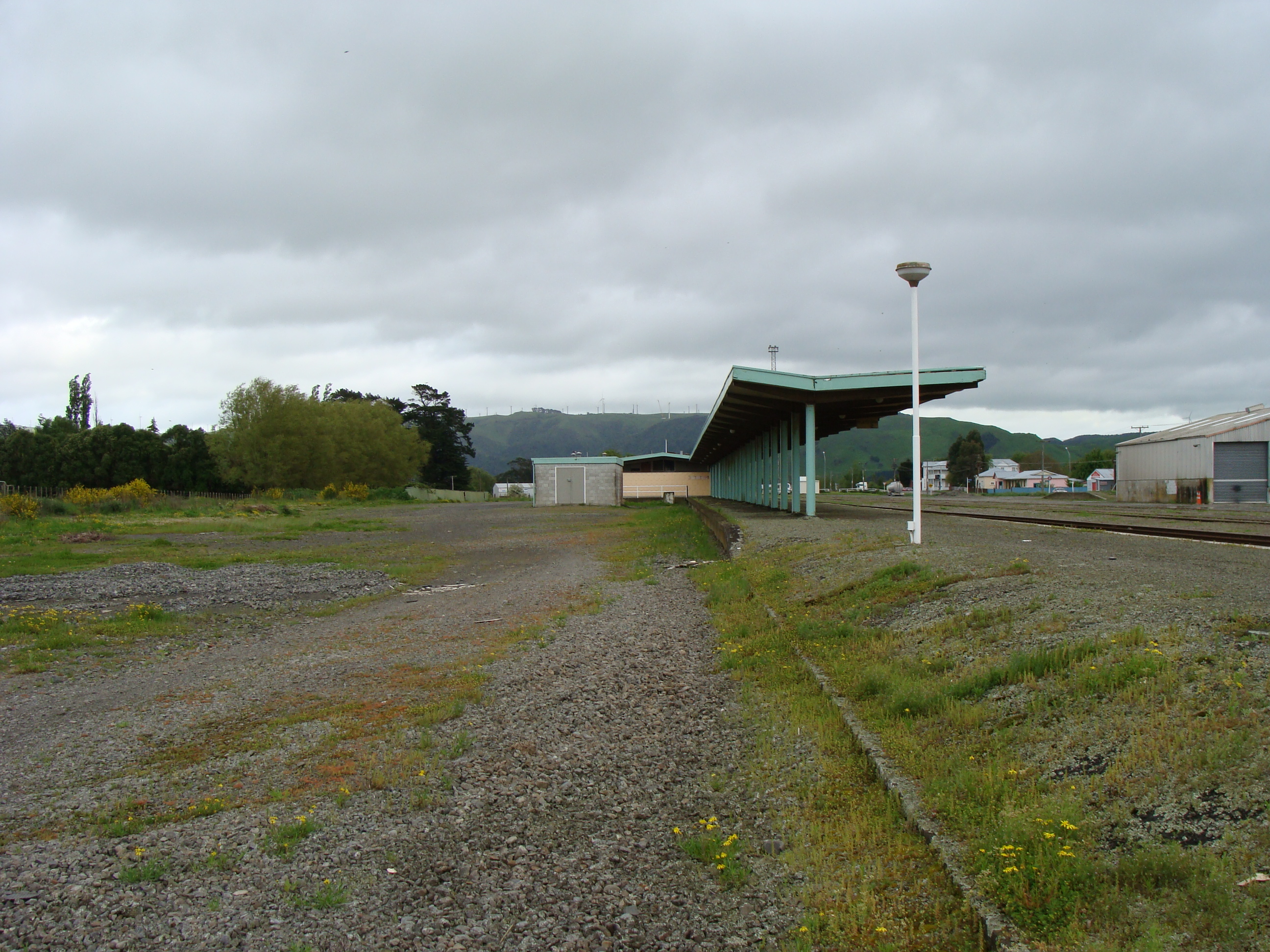
Woodville railway station Wairarapa dock siding and platform

Nationalisation of the Wellington – Manawatu line in 1908 resulted in several operational changes at Woodville. As the line was a superior route to Wellington compared with the Wairarapa Line over the Rimutaka Incline, as much freight as could be diverted to the new route was, and the Napier Express passenger trains were also diverted to run through Woodville via Palmerston North to Wellington. Following the opening of the Rimutaka Tunnel and deviation in 1955, the Wellington – Napier freight trains once again returned to the Wairarapa Line.

Woodville became the terminus of the Wairarapa Mail, a replacement locomotive-hauled passenger train introduced to provide passenger services to Wairarapa between Wellington and Woodville. In its later years, the Wairarapa Mail was extended from Woodville through to Palmerston North, operating as a mixed service between these two stations. Railcar services were introduced in 1936 over the same route using the new Wairarapa-class RM railcars, which eventually replaced the Wairarapa Mail in 1948 to due coal shortages. Despite this development, mixed trains on the northern section of the Wairarapa Line continued to operate. A mixed Woodville – Masterton and return service was run six days a week, Monday – Saturday, and in the opposite direction on Tuesdays, Thursdays, and Saturdays. The daily nature of this service made it popular with students attending secondary school in Masterton. After the Rimutaka Tunnel opened, both the Wairarapa railcars and the mixed trains were withdrawn and replaced by the new twinset railcars. As at 1959, Wairarapa services were still terminating at Woodville using the Wairarapa dock siding, and it was not uncommon for two or three railcars to be waiting at Woodville to transfer passengers between services. Locomotive hauled passenger trains through the Wairarapa to Woodville were gradually re-introduced from the mid-1960s, fully replacing the railcars in 1977. Later, passenger trains were run as through services between Palmerston North and Wellington via Woodville, but demand for these services declined through the 1980s, leading to their cancellation from 1 August 1988.

In 1959, the following list of staff members was provided for Woodville:

Position	#
Stationmasters	1
Section Officers	1
Shift Clerks	2
Cadets	2
Office Assistants	1
Exchange Attendant	1
Guards	4
Signalmen	7
Shunters and Traffic Assistants	11
Numbertakers	3
Traffic Assistants and Junior Porters	4
TOTAL	29

The Railways Department was keen to expand the use of railcars for passenger services following successful trials of the vehicles on select routes in the 1930s and 1940s. Accordingly, first Standard-class and later twinset railcars replaced the Napier Express passenger trains through Woodville from 1954. A locomotive-hauled passenger service was re-introduced from 1972, which was at first known as the Endeavour, and later the Bay Express from 11 December 1989. The Endeavour did not fully replace the railcars on this route until 1976. Declining patronage led to the cancellation of this service from 8 October 2001, and marked the closure of the station to timetabled passenger services.

=== Facilities ===
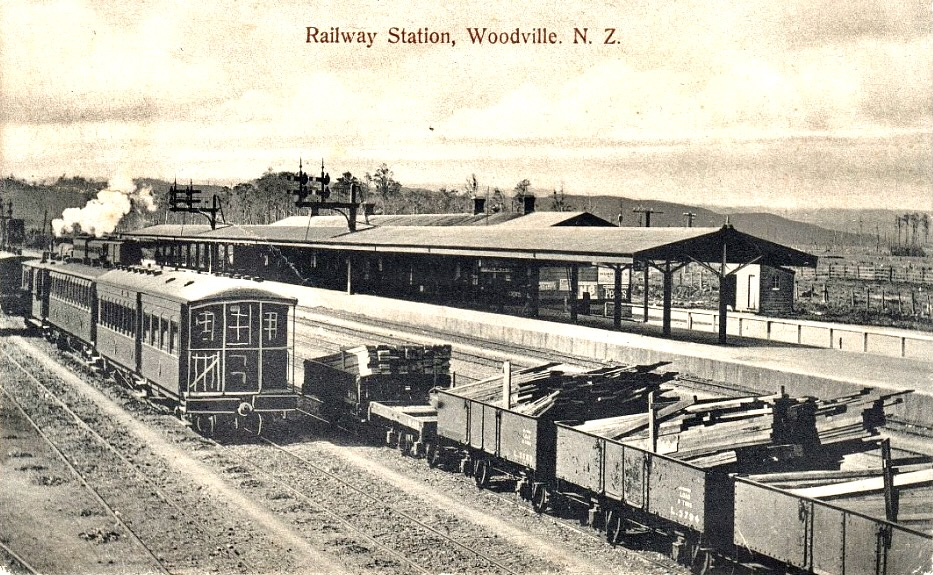

==== Original station: 1887–1964 ====
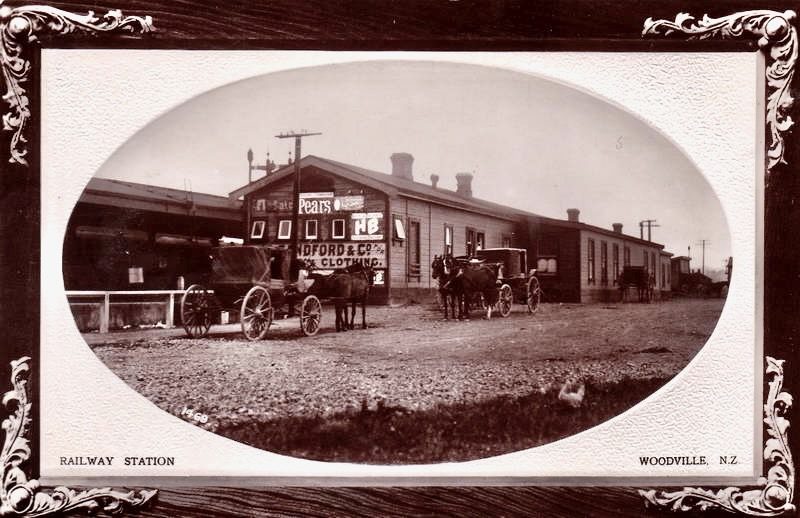
Both postcards show signals, so are after June 1898

There was some heated debate about the location of the station, after initial plans for the railway line to bypass Woodville were revised to include Woodville on the route. This was interpreted by the settlers of the area to mean that the line would run through the town, to which some vociferously objected. A meeting was organised to rally opposition to the move, but called off a few weeks later when the actual location of the station was revealed. The station was placed on the edge of the town to allow space for an engine shed and workshops.

The wooden station building was of a standard design, and had a long, sealed platform. On 8 July 1885 a contract was signed for station buildings, including a stationmaster's house and platelayers' cottages, which were completed by 7 January 1886. Further cottages or railway houses were added in 1887, 1897, 1926, 1928, 1931, 1943, 1944, 1946, 1949, 1953 and 1956. In 1886 further tenders were called for a 6th class station, with verandah, 40 ft (12 m) x 30 ft (9.1 m) goods shed, 2-stable engine shed and cattle and sheep yards. Munro Bros built the station and engine shed and Harris & McDonald the sheep and cattle yards, the work being completed by 10 May 1887. In July 1890 the Mayor of Woodville called a public meeting, which protested against removal of station buildings, but on 18 June 1891 the cost of shifting the engine shed from Woodville to Dannevirke was noted. However, on 9 February 1898 it was proposed an O class engine should run between Woodville and Masterton and a new engine shed was built in 1898 of galvanised iron, for 6 small engines, or 4 large. It had a large coal bunker and water tanks fed by a 3 hp (2.2 kW) kerosene pump. By 1896 the station had been upgraded to 3rd class, with a platform, cart approach, goods shed, loading bank, cattle yards, water service, stationmaster's house, urinals and a passing loop for 40 wagons. In September 1897 a crane was added and by 1898 there were also sheep yards, coal accommodation, the rebuilt engine shed, fixed signals and the loop had been extended for 65 wagons. In 1900 the station was connected with the telephone exchange and the Borough water supply. A 50 ft (15 m) turntable was built in 1887 and extended by 9 in (230 mm) in 1921 to take A^{D} class engines. In 1931 it was replaced by a 70 ft (21 m) turntable, which was made redundant by the balloon loop, decommissioned on 9 December 1974 and sent to Gisborne. A veranda covered the platform in front of the building, and extended a short distance to either side of the building. Two semaphore signal gantries rose up through the veranda, and several loops ran through the station yard. Other facilities were provided at the station at various times, including a social hall (later a second such facility was added, west of and near to the intersection of Station Street and McLean Street), a post and telegraph office, a crossing keeper for the McLean Street level crossing, a 80 ft (24 m) x 30 ft (9.1 m) goods shed, and a locomotive depot. There were dock sidings at both ends of the platform; the west (Palmerston North) end dock was renewed in 1921. There was a bookstall on the station from 1899, until at least 1924.

The station's 125th anniversary was celebrated on Saturday, 24 March 2012 at an event arranged by Woodville Districts Vision. In attendance were over 1,000 visitors including those who arrived on two special trains from Wellington and Palmerston North, as well as dignitaries from KiwiRail and the rail heritage community. The occasion also served as a reunion for former railways staff associated with the district and an opportunity to see rolling stock that used to work in the area.

===== Refreshment Room =====
From 13 December 1887 Thomas Fairhurst leased the Woodville Refreshment Rooms from the Railways Department for £338 a year. Mr. E. W. Ruddick took over in April 1899 and operated a private dining room there until 1921. In 1919, on account of the inadequacy of the facilities during the busy season, he requested an extra room be provided. From 1 January 1921, the refreshment room was assimilated by the Railways Department and run by the Refreshment Branch. By the time the railcars arrived, the only victuals on offer were tea and sandwiches. Losses continued to mount for the Refreshment Branch due in part to faster trains, and following the recommendations of the 1952 Royal Commission, the Woodville refreshment room was immediately closed on 9 November 1952. The dining room was deemed to be in excess of the requirements of the Refreshment Branch, and reallocated for use as office space, including that of the Inspector of the Permanent Way, and the kitchen was converted for use as a communications equipment room. Woodville's dining room was once described by New Zealand author Katherine Mansfield as "a great barn of a place – full of primly papered chandeliers and long tables – decorated with paper flowers – and humanity most painfully in evidence."

In 1963, the east-end (Wairarapa) dock siding at Woodville was extended 180 feet (55 m) and the crossover was shifted to a more central position. This enabled the railcars to stop closer to each other, shortening the distance transferring passengers would have to walk between railcars.

The condition of the station building had been gradually deteriorating to the point where, in May 1960, tenders were invited for the renovation of the station building. Tenders closed on 22 June, but when no tenders were received, three local firms were approached and asked to provide quotations for the work. Two quotes were received, but it was considered that these prices were too high, and on 17 November it was decided instead to replace the station.

==== Replacement station and deviation: 1964–1966 ====
In legislation and Hansard the proposed Woodville balloon loop was referred to as the 'Woodville Connection'. It was approved by the Finance Act of 1957 and the written description of the line was as follows; A connecting line leaving the Wellington to Woodville Railway near the Manga-atua Stream and running in a westerly direction to a junction with the Palmerston North to Napier Railway at McLean Street. Length about 1¼ miles. From the debate it is clear the loop was proposed due to the completion of Rimutaka Tunnel, and the subsequent increase of through traffic over the Wairarapa Line.

The loop line was required to maintain the correct direction of rolling stock coupling hooks. Prior to the construction of the loop teams of men were required to change the direction of all hooks on through travelling wagons over the Wairarapa Line, and this was done at Masterton or Woodville depending on the period. The coupling hook direction anomaly was caused by the fact the Wellington – Palmerston North – Woodville – Wellington line is an enormous balloon loop in its own right.

The land to be taken for the balloon loop was gazetted on 12 March 1958.

Plans for the new station building were finalised in 1962. The new building was one of several changes intended for the station, with other work including a new 1.25 miles (2.01 km) loop line, alterations to the yard trackwork (including moving the main line), a new platform, a new veranda, and alterations to the road approaches. It was decided to install a balloon loop because a turning triangle would have been difficult and expensive given the terrain around Woodville.

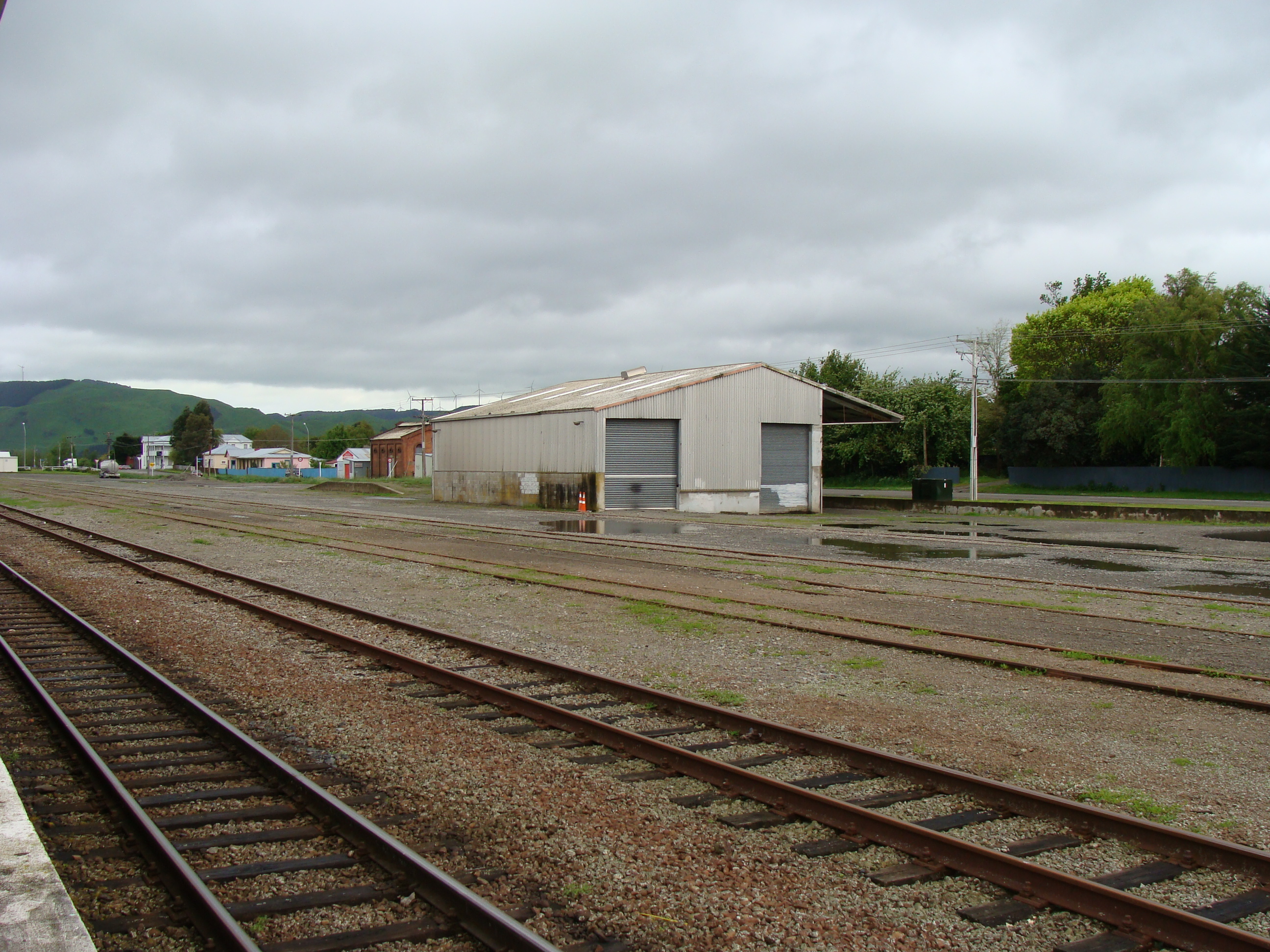
Woodville railway station goods shed and loading bank

On 20 August 1963, the District Engineer was notified that the amount of funding available for the project had been increased to £124,300 for the track alterations and construction of the new loop line, and £41,500 for the new station building. Advertisements were placed in local newspapers in December 1963 and January 1964 inviting interested parties to submit tenders for the construction of the new building. The requirements were listed thus: "The building has an approximate area of 4,350 ft^{2} (404 m^{2}) (as built it was 141 ft (43 m) x 36 ft (11 m), or 5,076 ft^{2} (471.6 m^{2})) and is of composite construction with concrete foundations and floors, timber frame, block veneer and aluminium roof. Structural steel verandas with an approximate area of 7880 sq. ft. are also included in the contract". Tenders closed on 12 February 1964, and construction was expected to begin a few weeks later. Six tenders were received from the following local firms: Morris and Bailey Ltd.; E. M. David & Co. (Pahiatua); Jacques Bros. Ltd. (Pahiatua); J. Browne (Pahiatua); Kensington & Fraser (Woodville); Gerry Ogden and Walsh Ltd. (Dannevirke). The tender of Morris and Bailey was accepted for £30,876 on 21 February. A contract for the construction of the loop line formation had already been let to Brill and Norris Ltd. of Palmerston North in April 1963.

As the new station was to be built next to the existing station, the Foreman of Works was requested on 10 March to demolish the west end of the existing building prior to the arrival on site of the building contractor. In order to minimise disruption to users of the station, the District Traffic Manager was requested to arrange for a temporary Ladies Waiting Room and an office for the numbertaker if required.

Morris and Bailey were advised on 31 March that the site would be ready for construction on 1 April, and that they were expected to complete the contract by 31 March 1965. Due to an omission in the tender, the price of the contract was increased to £31,439.15.0 on 21 April.

The Foreman of Works was advised on 7 October that the contractor expected to have the building ready for use in early November. He was requested to arrange for the necessary furniture to be delivered pending completion of the building. On 10 November, Mr. Morris revised the completion date to 4 December, and was requested to carry out several minor tasks that were in addition to the contract.

The building was finally ready for occupation on 11 December 1964. However, several tasks in the overall project remained outstanding including: demolition of the existing station building and veranda; extension of the veranda at the eastern (Napier) end of the platform; rebuild platform; and lay a new main line, and therefore the Chief Civil Engineer advised the General Manager that an opening ceremony was not warranted at that time. This recommendation was accepted, and it was planned to hold an appropriate ceremony on completion of the entire project.

Following relocation of station operations to the new building, tenders were called for the purchase and removal of the old building from the site. Tenders closed on 11 February 1965, with the only bidder being the Central Salvage Company for £61.10.0, which was duly accepted. The Railways Department were initially advised that demolition was expected to commence on 24 February, but this was later revised to 15 March.

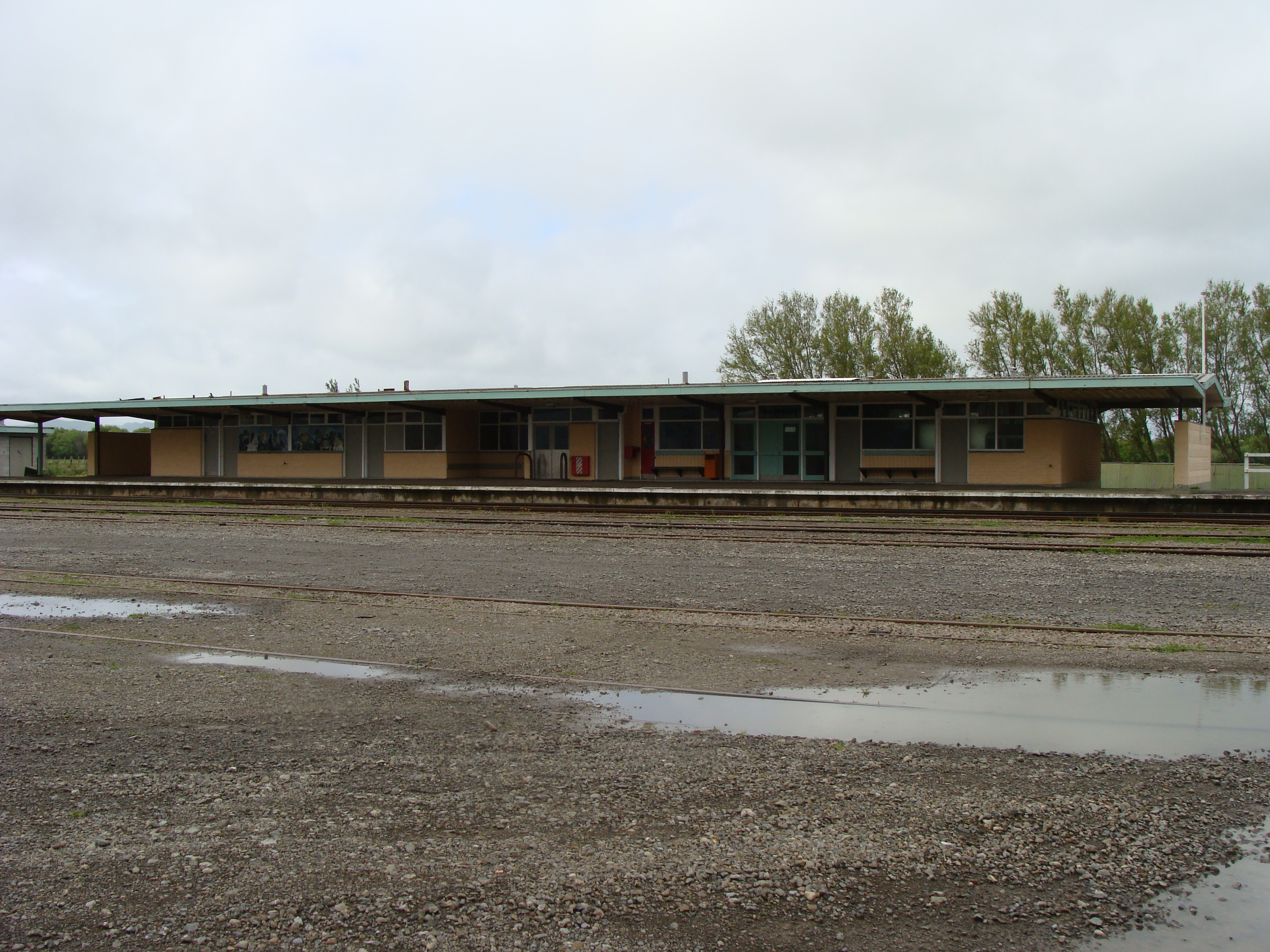
Woodville railway station building

Discussions on arrangements for an official opening of the new station and deviation began in May 1966. Though it was expected that the new deviation and signalling system would officially commence operation at on 19 July, it was decided to hold the ceremony on 25 July at the station followed by afternoon tea for invited guests at the nearby Railway Hotel. The official party included Mr. and Mrs. John McAlpine, Mr. and Mrs. A. T. Gandell, Mr. and Mrs. G. F. Bridges, Mr. and Mrs. A. K. Morris or Mr. and Mrs. I. B. Bailey (on behalf of the station building contractors), Mr. and Mrs. Brill (on behalf of the deviation earthworks contractors), and Mr. and Mrs. N. H. Lanham. McAlpine unveiled a plaque that had been mounted on the end wall of the station building to mark the occasion, and which read:

THIS PLAQUE WAS UNVEILED
By The
HON. J. K. McALPINE
MINISTER OF RAILWAYS
TO MARK THE COMPLETION OF THE
WOODVILLE STATION AND DEVIATION
25 JULY 1966

The ceremony marked the completion of the most significant stages of the project. Other work which had also been completed by this time by Railways Department staff included an extension of the yard to handle longer trains, and a new power signalling and interlocking system to replace the old mechanical interlocking and semaphore signals. The new system was controlled from a desk in the station building, superseding the two signal boxes required to operate the old system. This coincided with the commissioning of automatic signalling through the Manawatū Gorge, extending the area of responsibility for the Palmerston North CTC over the Palmerston North – Woodville section. However, not all of the works planned for Woodville had been completed. A new goods shed and a new staff amenities building for the Permanent Way and Signals staff had still to be constructed, and were already in the planning stages. A new goods shed was built in 1970 by T C Hunt, for $27,667.

== Today ==
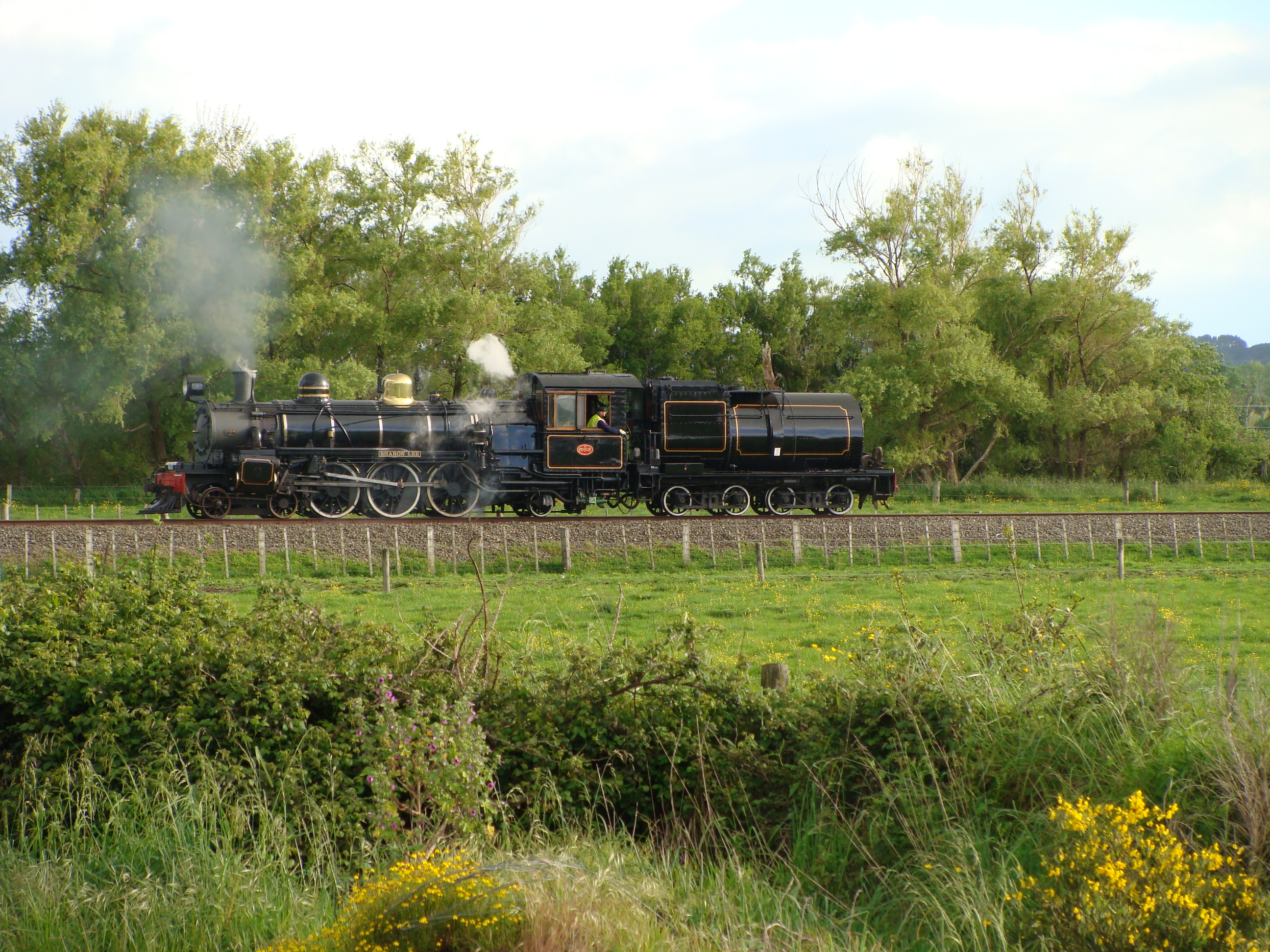
NZR A^{B} class No. 663 "Sharon Lee" running backwards around the Woodville balloon loop

Physically, Woodville remains largely intact, having retained its station building, platform, balloon loop, loading bank, goods shed, and some of its crossing loops and sidings. The local Rotary Club, with the assistance of the Rail Heritage Trust of New Zealand, spruced up the station building in the mid-2000s for the benefit of excursion trains. The local community investigated options for restoring the building and future uses for it. The station is stilled owned by KiwiRail and is tenanted to the Woodville Railway Station Trust.

For a period of seven years from 27 November 1988, the northern section of the Wairarapa Line was effectively mothballed. Congestion on the Wellington – Palmerston North section of the NIMT led to the redirection of the Wellington – Napier freight services through the Wairarapa from 14 August 1995, though these services were redirected back to their original route from 14 December 2008 following the daylighting of tunnels Nos. 3, 4, 5 on the PNGL which allowed the use of hi-cube containers through the Manawatū Gorge. Today, there are up to 55 scheduled movements through Woodville each week, most of which are trains terminating at or passing through Palmerston North, but some passed through Woodville to/from the Wairarapa, including a weekly Wellington – Palmerston North freight service, though not since the Wairarapa line has been closed between Masterton and Newman. Shunts between Palmerston North and Pahiatua pass through Woodville usually on a daily basis (though they may vary with demand) but do not stop there. The station yard is also still used to marshal or cross trains when required. Woodville is occasionally either a waypoint or a destination for excursion passenger trains operated by local rail heritage organisations such as Feilding and District Steam Rail Society, Mainline Steam, Steam Incorporated, and the Pahiatua Railcar Society.

== See also ==
- Wairarapa Line
- Palmerston North - Gisborne Line
- Balloon loop
