= Pahiatua Railcar Society =

Coordinates: 40°26′42.77″S 175°48′50.7″E

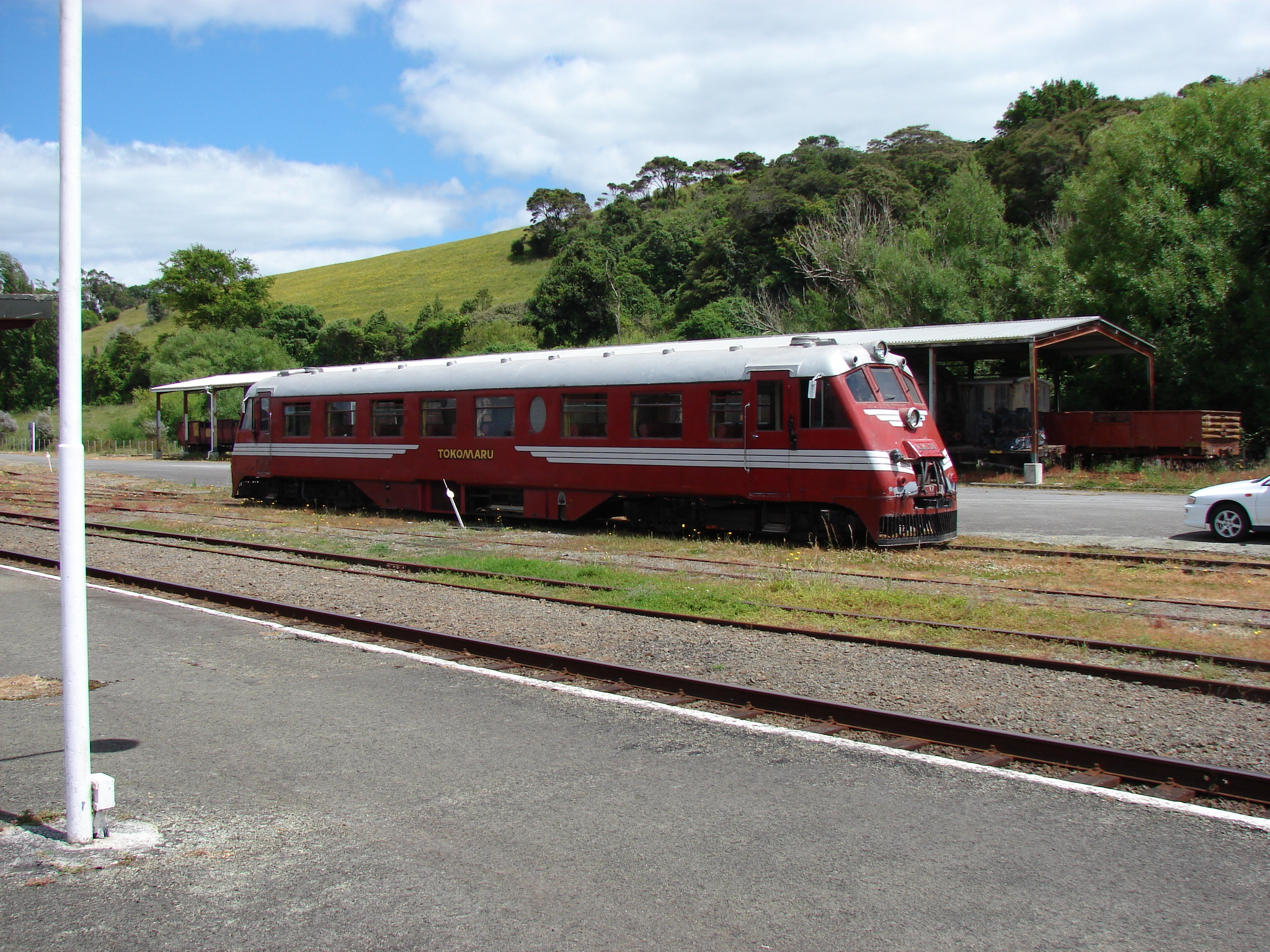
Standard railcar RM 31 in the yard at Pahiatua station.

The Pahiatua Railcar Society (PRS) is a society located in Pahiatua, New Zealand, dedicated to the restoration of railcars and other locomotives and rolling stock formerly operated by the New Zealand Railways Department. It is notable for possessing the sole remaining examples of the RM class 88 seater and Wairarapa railcars.

Having restored Standard class railcar Rm 31 to mainline standard for use on the national railway network, the Society ran its first revenue services on the Wairarapa Line at an open day on 12 February 2012.

== Infrastructure ==
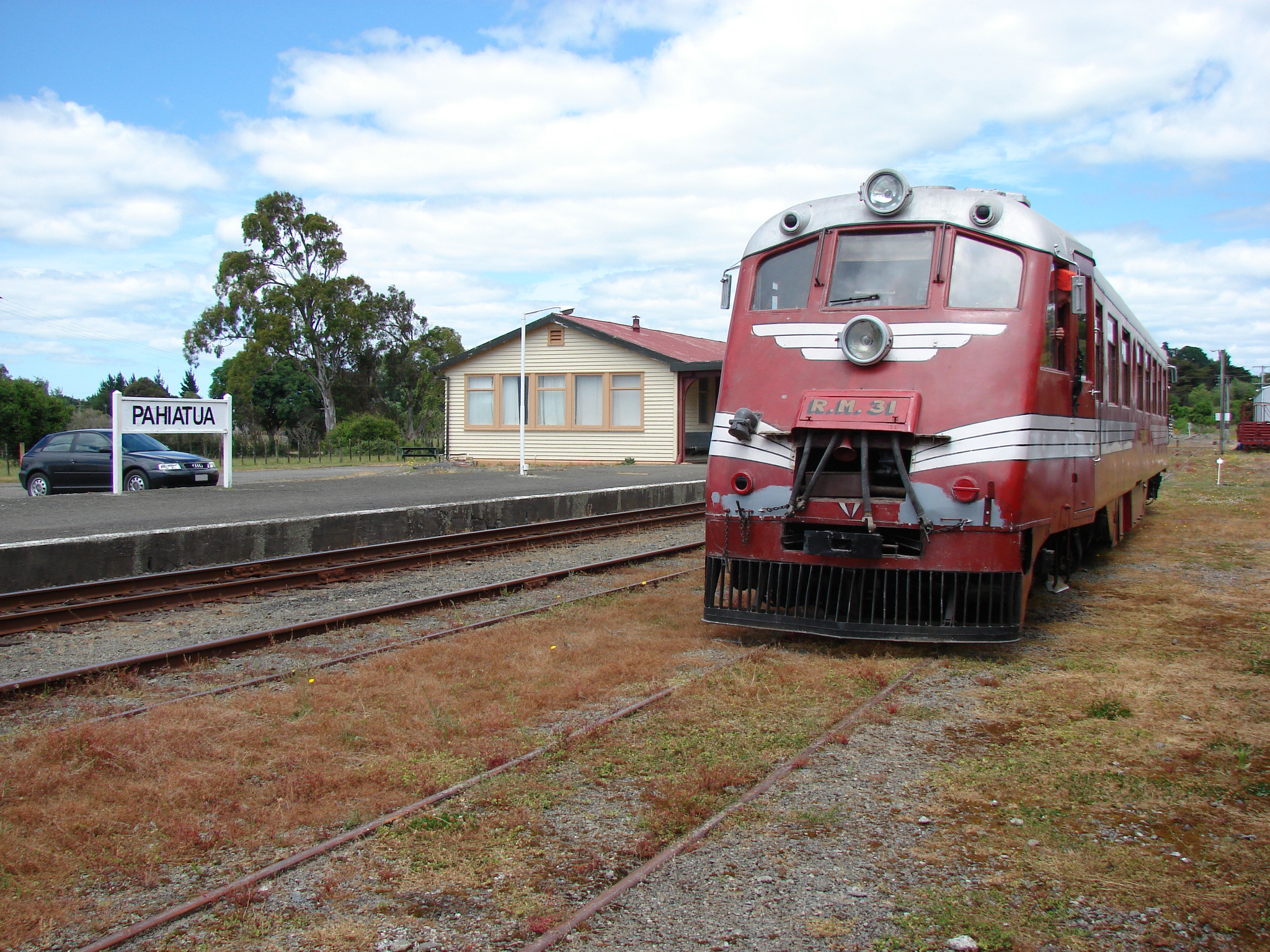
RM 31 in the Pahiatua yard with the station building and platform to the left.

The PRS is based at Pahiatua's railway station on the Wairarapa Line and has preserved the station building, goods shed, and surrounds. The railway station is a wooden structure that dates from 1971 and was built to replace a former building from 1897 that had been demolished. It is one of the last wooden stations built by the New Zealand Railways Department and one of the few remaining examples of its type. The goods shed dates from 1897 and is one of the larger rural goods sheds to survive in New Zealand. The PRS has added its own structures to the station precinct: a railcar shed for storage and restoration work, and another shed to provide shelter for the society's rolling stock.

== Rolling stock ==
=== NZR Railcars ===
Key:	In service, Mainline Certified	In service	Under overhaul/restoration	Stored	Static display	Scrapped

Original class and number	TMS number	Name	Builder	Year built	Arrived	Notes
Rm 1	RM 18		Nissho Iwai	1972	2020	
Rm 2	RM 24		Nissho Iwai	1972	2020	
Rm 3	RM 30		Nissho Iwai	1972	2020	
Rm 5		Mahuhu	NZR Hutt Workshops	1936	1992	Leased from Silver Stream Railway
Rm 31		Tokomaru	NZR Hutt Workshops	1938	2001	
Rm 34		Tainui	NZR Hutt Workshops	1938	2019	
Rm 121			Birmingham Railway Carriage and Wagon Company on behalf of Drewry Car Company	1956	2003	Owned by the RM 133 Railcar Trust Board
Rm 133			Birmingham Railway Carriage and Wagon Company on behalf of Drewry Car Company	1956	2002	Owned by the RM 133 Railcar Trust Board

=== Diesel locomotives ===
Key:	In service, Mainline Certified	In service	Under overhaul/restoration	Stored	Static display	Scrapped

Original class and number	Builder	Year built	Arrived	Notes
TR 36	Drewry Car Company	1939		
TR 160	A & G Price	1959	2004	
PWD D 597		1937		

=== Wagons ===
Key:	In service, Mainline Certified	In service	Under overhaul/restoration	Stored	Static display	Scrapped

Original class and number	Type	Year built	Notes
Bc 70	4 wheel cement wagon	1963	
Jc 4857	4 wheel sheep wagon	1967	
Kp 2714	4 wheel steel box wagon	196?	
La 15097	4 wheel highsided wagon	1920	
Lb 3217	4 wheel highsided wagon	1976	
Lb 2854	4 wheel highsided wagon	197?	
Mc 2383	4 wheel lowside wagon	1967	
Mcc 2023	4 wheel motorcar wagon	1941	
Rb 558	Bogie highside wagon	1952	
T 218	Bogie cattle wagon	1965	
Ub 1208	Bogie flat wagon	1950	Supporting No. 1 end of RM121
Ur 1953	Bogie flat wagon	1964	Supporting No. 2 end of RM121
Uc 824	Bogie tank wagon	1928	
Vr 20	Bogie insulated wagon	196?	
W 1235	4 wheel insulated box wagon	1960	
Yb 581	4 wheel ballast wagon	1942	
Za 1327	Bogie steel box wagon	1976	

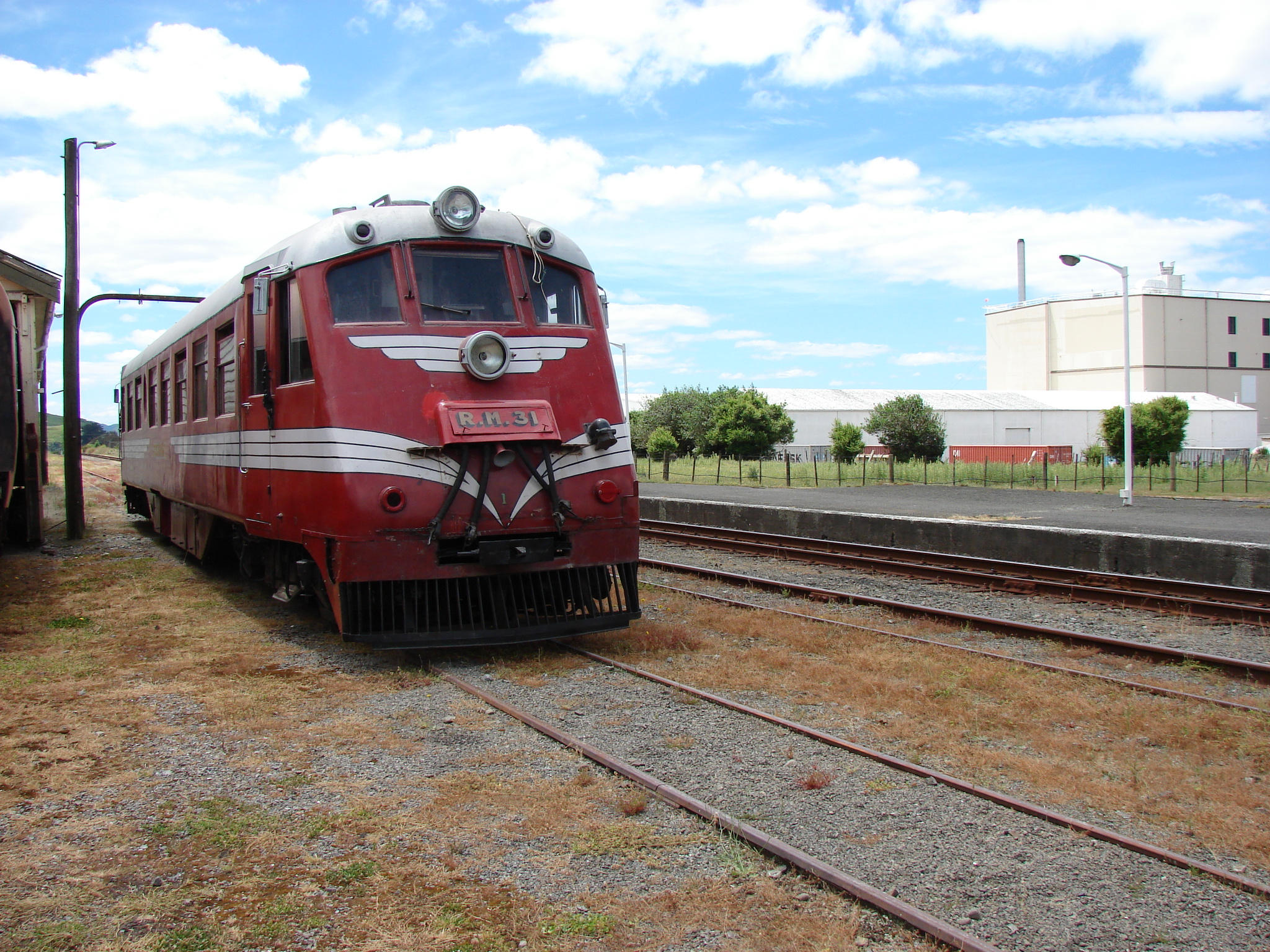
RM 31 in Pahiatua yard.

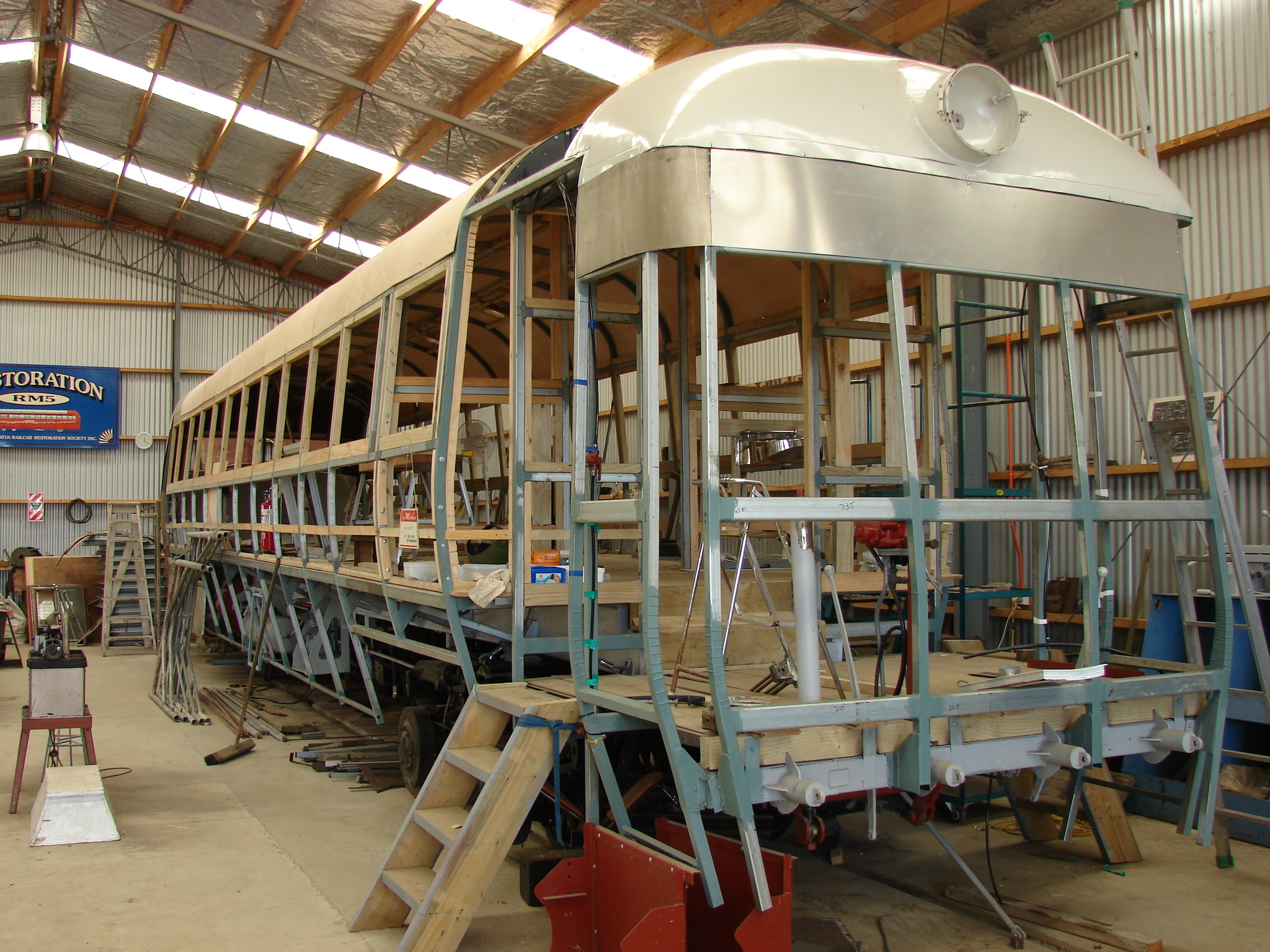
RM 5 under restoration.

Rm 31 is the society's only operating railcar and is one of four preserved railcars of the Standard class. The PRS is actively restoring Rm 5, which has had to be largely rebuilt due to its rotten wooden frame, and Rm 121. Parts of Rm 119 and Rm 133 are being used on Rm 121. It used to be believed that no 88 seater railcar would survive for preservation, but the PRS and the Rm 133 Railcar Trust Board recovered Rm 133 from its resting place at Auckland International Airport where it had been used by the rescue services for training. As both ends were affected by a fire, it has subsequently been decided to dedicate all efforts to the restoration of Rm 121. Both ends of Rm 121 have now been recovered and other parts have been sourced from the remnants of Rm 133 and Rm 119. The society aims to fully rebuild an operational 88 seater.

The two TR locomotives are small shunting locomotives, and the PWD D class is another shunting locomotive that was solely operated by the PWD on its construction projects and never owned by the Railways Department. The Society also possesses three jiggers (surfacemen's trolleys), two motorised and one hand-powered, and the turntable from Thames. The society's collection of rolling stock includes both four-wheel and bogie wagons of an array of types, from a guard's van to cement and sheep wagons.

In September 2020, the Society announced it had bought the three recently-retired Silver Fern Railcars off of KiwiRail.
