= List of bus routes in the Wellington Region =

This is a list of Greater Wellington Regional Council contracted bus routes in the Wellington Region, New Zealand operated under the banner of the Metlink public transport network, as well as commercially operated commuter services. There are approximately 100 bus routes in total across the region.

== Route numbers ==
Route numbers are generally classified by area: routes 1–29 are Wellington City routes, 30–39 are express and peak-only routes, 50–59 and 60 are Newlands routes, 80–99 are commercial routes, 110–119 are Upper Hutt City routes, 120–199 are Lower Hutt City routes, 200–209 are Wairarapa routes, 220–239 are Porirua City routes, 250–299 are Kāpiti Coast routes, and 300–999 are school bus routes or other special routes.

From July 2018, many Wellington City routes were shortened to connect with high-frequency spine routes at bus hubs, but extend to the city centre at peak times. For example, the usual route 60 service in Porirua connects with the route 1 service during the day, but extends to Wellington City in the peak time as route 60e. These extended routes sometimes differ from other peak-only routes by running in both directions at peak (although some do only run in one direction). An 'x' suffix generally means that the service is an express service and does not stop at all the bus stops along the route.

Prior to 2018, routes 40–49 were used for routes in Wellington City's north-western suburbs, and prior to 2011 Porirua City routes were numbered from 60–69 and Kāpiti Coast routes from 70–79. Other services, like the railway lines, cable car, and harbour ferry, are given lettered route numbers (for example, the Melling Line is MEL).

== Route operators ==
Under the new Public Transport Operating Model, all Wellington Region bus routes were put out to tender in 2016. All tendered routes in Wellington City were awarded to Tranzit Group, and all direct appointment routes in Wellington City and Eastbourne remain with NZ Bus and Newlands Coach Services. Uzabus won all tendered routes on the Kāpiti Coast, and Tranzit Group (under the brand Tranzurban) won all tendered routes in the Hutt Valley and Porirua and remained the bus operator in the Wairarapa.

== List of routes ==
High frequency (every 10–15 minutes)
Operates infrequently (less than one service each way per hour)
Operates at peak times only

=== Wellington City routes from 2018 ===
These bus routes, which came into operation on 15 July 2018, operate within the Wellington City area. Previously, Wellington City services (with the exception of Newlands and Johnsonville services) were operated entirely by GO Wellington.

Route	Route name	Start	Via	End	Operator	Days of operation	Notes
1	North-South Spine	Island Bay – The Parade	Wellington Hospital, Courtenay Place, Wellington station, Johnsonville	Grenada Village, Churton Park, and Johnsonville West	Tranzit Group	Mon-Sun	At Johnsonville, services split into three routes going to each destination.
2	East-West Spine	Karori – Karori Park	Courtenay Place, Kilbirnie, Miramar	Seatoun, Miramar	NZ Bus	Mon-Sun	At Miramar Shops, services split into two routes going into Miramar and Seatoun.
3	Lyall Bay/Rongotai	Wellington Station	Courtenay Place, Taranaki St, Wellington Hospital, Kilbirnie	Rongotai and Lyall Bay	NZ Bus	Mon-Sun	Splits into two 20-minute frequency routes at the Kilbirnie end.
4	Mairangi/Strathmore Park	Mairangi	Karori Tunnel, Victoria University, Courtenay Place, Wellington Hospital, Kilbirnie, Miramar Shops	Strathmore Park	NZ Bus	Mon-Sun	Half-hourly on the Weekend
7	Kingston	Wellington Station	Brooklyn	Kingston	Tranzit Group	Mon-Sun	Half-hourly on Sundays.
13	Mairangi	Brandon Street	Karori Tunnel, Northland	Mairangi – Norwich Street	NZ Bus	Mon-Fri	
14	Wilton/Hataitai	Wilton	Wadestown, Wellington Station, Courtenay Place, Roseneath	Hataitai	NZ Bus	Mon-Sun	
17	Kowhai Park – Brooklyn – Wellington	Wellington Station	Brooklyn	Kowhai Park	Tranzit group	Mon-Sun	Doesn't stop at Brooklyn Interchange but 2 services travel via Brooklyn Interchange to service Brooklyn School.
18	Miramar	Darlington Road, Miramar	Miramar Shops, Kilbirnie, Wellington Hospital, Massey University, Ghuznee Street, Victoria University	Karori Park	NZ Bus	Mon-Fri	
19	Churton Park	Johnsonville		Churton Park	Tranzit Group	Mon-Sun	
20	Mt Victoria	Wellington Station	Courtenay Place, Mount Victoria	Kilbirnie	NZ Bus	Mon-Sun	
21	Wrights Hill/Kelburn	Courtenay Place	Ghuznee Street, Victoria University, Karori Tunnel, Wrights Hill	Karori Mall	NZ Bus	Mon-Sun	Every 10 minutes to Victoria University, half-hourly to Karori.
22	Kelburn/Northland	Wellington Station	The Terrace, Victoria University, Karori Tunnel, Mairangi, Khandallah	Johnsonville	NZ Bus	Mon-Fri	Every 10 minutes to Victoria University, hourly to Johnsonville.
23	Houghton Bay	Wellington Station	Courtenay Place, Wellington Hospital, Wellington Zoo	Houghton Bay	Tranzit Group	Mon-Sun	
24	Maupuia/Evans Bay/Broadmeadows	Miramar Shops	Mt Crawford, Maupuia, Kilbirnie, Oriental Parade, Courtenay Place, Wellington Station, Khandallah, Broadmeadows	Johnsonville	Tranzit Group	Mon-Sun	
25	Khandallah/Aro Valley/Highbury	Khandallah	Ngaio Gorge Rd, Wellington Station, Aro Valley	Highbury Terminus	Tranzit Group	Mon-Sun	
26	Ngaio	Brandon Street	Ngaio	Khandallah	NZ Bus	Mon-Fri	Peak-only route
27	Vogeltown	Kingston Terminus	Wellington Station	Hutchison Rd, Massey University, Taranaki St	Tranzit Group	Mon-Sun	
29	Ōwhiro Bay/Southgate	Brooklyn Library	Happy Valley, Ōwhiro Bay, Island Bay, Southgate, Wellington Hospital, Courtenay Place	Wellington Station	Tranzit Group	Mon-Sun	
30x	Moa Point/Scorching Bay express	Wellington Station	Miramar Shops, Strathmore Shops, Seatoun	Moa Point and Scorching Bay	NZ Bus	Mon-Fri	Peak-only express service, alternates between two Seatoun termini.
31x	Miramar North express	Wellington Station	Miramar Shops	Miramar North Road	NZ Bus	Mon-Fri	Peak-only express service
32x	Houghton Bay express	Wellington Station	Island Bay via Adelaide Road	Houghton Bay	Tranzit Group	Mon-Fri	Peak-only express service
33	Karori South	Brandon Street	Karori Tunnel, Karori Mall	Karori South – Hazlewood Avenue	NZ Bus	Mon-Fri	Peak-only service. Services operate hourly during off peak hours with services ending/beginning at Karori Mall instead of Brandon Street.
34	Karori West	Brandon Street	Karori Tunnel, Karori Mall	Karori West – Montgomery Avenue	NZ Bus	Mon-Fri	Peak-only service. Services operate hourly during off peak hours with services ending/beginning at Karori Mall instead of Brandon Street.
35	Hataitai	Wellington Station	Courtenay Place, Hataitai Bus Tunnel	Hataitai	NZ Bus	Mon-Fri	Peak-only service.
36	Lyall Bay	Wellington Station	Courtenay Place, Hataitai Bus Tunnel, Kilbirnie	Lyall Bay	NZ Bus	Mon-Fri	Peak-only service
37	Wrights Hill	Brandon Street	The Terrace, Victoria University, Karori Tunnel, Wrights Hill	Karori Mall	NZ Bus	Mon-Fri	Peak-only service.
38x	Strathmore Park express	Wellington Station	Courtenay Place, Hataitai Bus Tunnel, Kilbirnie	Strathmore Park	NZ Bus	Mon-Fri	Peak-only service.
39	Island Bay Shops	Wellington Station	Owhiro Bay	Island Bay Shops	Tranzit Group	Mon-Friday	Peak only service
52	Johnsonville via Newlands	Courtenay Place	Wellington Station, Hutt Road, Newlands Road, Newlands Park, Baylands Drive, Woodridge – Kentwood Drive, Helston Road	Johnsonville	Newlands Coach Services	Mon-Sun	Does not operate during southbound AM peak and northbound PM peak
56	Johnsonville via Paparangi	Courtenay Place	Wellington Station, Hutt Road, Newlands Road, Newlands Park, Helston Road	Johnsonville	Newlands Coach Services	Mon-Fri	Southbound only AM peak, northbound only PM peak
57	Woodridge	Courtenay Place	Wellington Station, Hutt Road, Newlands Road, Newlands Park	Woodridge – Kentwood Drive	Newlands Coach Services	Mon-Fri	Southbound only AM peak, northbound only PM peak
58	Baylands	Courtenay Place	Wellington Station, Hutt Road, Newlands Road, Newlands Park	Baylands Drive	Newlands Coach Services	Mon-Fri	Southbound only AM peak, northbound only PM peak
59	Greenacres - Tawa - Grenada North	Greenacres	Tawa	Grenada North	Mana Coach Services	Mon-Fri	
60	Porirua/Tawa/Johnsonville	Porirua	Kenepuru Hospital, Tawa	Johnsonville	Mana Coach Services	Mon-Sun	
60e	Porirua/Tawa/Johnsonville (extension)	Porirua	Kenepuru Hospital, Tawa, Johnsonville, Wellington Station	Courtenay Place	Mana Coach Services	Mon-Fri	Peak-only extension of the 60 service.
AX	Airport Express	Wellington Station	Lambton Quay, Willis Street, Manners Street, Courtenay Place, Kilbirnie	Wellington Airport	Mana Coach Services	Mon-Sun	Replaced the Airport Flyers 91 service.
HX	Hospital Express	Wellington Station	Direct via Quays	Wellington Hospital	Tranzit Group	Mon-Fri	In addition to the reduced number 1 service due to the 2021 driver shortage

=== Hutt Valley routes ===
These Hutt Valley routes first came into service on 15 July, 2018. Previously, Hutt Valley services were operated entirely by Valley Flyer.

Route	Route name	Start	Via	End	Operator	Days of operation	Notes
81	Eastbourne – Wellington	Eastbourne	Petone	Courtenay Place	NZ Bus	Mon-Fri	Via motorway.
83	Eastbourne – Wellington	Eastbourne	Lower Hutt, Petone	Courtenay Place	NZ Bus	Mon-Sun	
84	Gracefield – Wellington	Gracefield	Petone	Courtenay Place	NZ Bus	Mon-Fri	Via motorway, counter-peak.
110	Upper Hutt – Petone	Petone	Lower Hutt, Taita, Stokes Valley Entrance, Fergusson Drive, Upper Hutt	Emerald Hill	Tranzit Group	Mon-Sun	Every 15 minutes Petone to Upper Hutt, half-hourly to Emerald Hill.
111	Totara Park	Totara Park		Upper Hutt Station	Tranzit Group	Mon-Sat	
112	Te Mārua	Plateau	Te Mārua, Timberlea, Maoribank	Upper Hutt Station	Tranzit Group	Mon-Sat	
113	Riverstone Terraces	Riverstone Terraces	Trentham	Upper Hutt Station	Tranzit Group	Mon-Fri	Peak-only service.
114	Poets Block	Trentham Station	Brentwood Ave, Trentham, Elderslea	Upper Hutt Station	Tranzit Group	Mon-Sat	
115	Pinehaven	Pinehaven Library	Silverstream, Heretaunga, Wallaceville	Upper Hutt Station	Tranzit Group	Mon-Sat	
120	Stokes Valley	Stokes Valley	Taita, Hutt Hospital	Lower Hutt	Tranzit Group	Mon-Sun	Half-hourly on Sundays.
121	Valley Heights	Stokes Valley Heights	Stokes Valley, Pomare, Taita, Naenae, Hutt Hospital, Lower Hutt, Waiwhetu	Gracefield	Tranzit Group	Mon-Sat	2 Service's go to and from Tui Glen school And 2 via Tui Glen School
130	Naenae	Naenae	Waterloo Interchange, Lower Hutt, Moera	Petone	Tranzit Group	Mon-Sun	Half-hourly on Sundays.
145	Belmont	Belmont	Melling station	Lower Hutt	Tranzit Group	Mon-Sat	1 service is from Hutt Intermediate School in the Afternoon
149	Tirohanga	Melling Station	Tirohanga	Queensgate	Tranzit Group	Mon-Fri	Operates in a loop around Tirohanga before returning the way it came. Some morning and afternoon Services start and/or end at Waterloo Station.
150	Western Hills	Kelson	Waterloo Interchange, Hutt Hospital, Lower Hutt, Maungaraki	Petone	Tranzit Group	Mon-Sun	
154	Korokoro	Korokoro		Petone	Tranzit Group	Mon-Sat	There are 2 morning bus that go via school's after doing the loop
160	Wainuiomata North	Wainuiomata Bus Depot	Wainuiomata, Wainuiomata North, Waterloo Interchange	Lower Hutt	Tranzit Group	Mon-Sun	Combined with 170 provides every-15-minute service to Wainuiomata.
170	Wainuiomata South	Homedale Road	Wood St, Wainuiomata, Waterloo Interchange	Lower Hutt	Tranzit Group	Mon-Sun	Combined with 160 provides every-15-minute service to Wainuiomata.

=== Wairarapa routes ===
The Wairarapa is physically separated from Wellington by the Remutaka Range. Connections to Wellington are made by the Wairarapa Connection train from Masterton to Wellington.

Route	Route name	Start	Via	End	Operator	Days of operation	Notes
200	Wairarapa	Masterton – Church Street	Masterton – Queen Street, Carterton, Greytown, Featherston	Martinborough	Tranzit Group	Mon-Sun	Connects with the Wairarapa Line railway service at Featherston station. Runs infrequently, but classified as a connector service.
201	Masterton West Loop	Masterton – Church Street	Cornwall St, Masonic Village, Panama Village, Cole St.	Masterton – Church Street	Tranzit Group	Mon-Fri	Routes 201, 202, 203, and 206 are all operated by a single bus on a loop.
202	Masterton South Loop	Masterton – Church Street	Michael St, York St, High St, Vivian St, South Rd, Chanel College	Masterton – Church Street	Tranzit Group	Mon-Fri	Routes 201, 202, 203, and 206 are all operated by a single bus on a loop.
203	Masterton North Loop	Masterton – Church Street	Wairarapa Hospital, Roberts Rd, Kitchener St, Opaki Rd	Masterton – Church Street	Tranzit Group	Mon-Fri	Routes 201, 202, 203, and 206 are all operated by a single bus on a loop.
204	Greytown	Woodside Station		Greytown	Tranzit Group	Mon-Fri	Shuttle bus to connect Greytown with Wairarapa railway service at Woodside.
206	Masterton East Loop	Masterton – Church Street	River Rd, Worksop Rd	Masterton – Church Street	Tranzit Group	Mon-Fri	Routes 201, 202, 203, and 206 are all operated by a single bus on a loop.

=== Porirua routes ===
Most Porirua services connect with the Kāpiti Line railway service at Porirua station. The route 60 service connects Wellington City and Porirua City bus services by road (see the Wellington City section). Previously, Porirua services were operated entirely by Mana Coach Services.

Route	Route name	Start	Via	End	Operator	Days of operation	Notes
210	Titahi Bay	Titahi Bay – Pikarere St	Porirua City Centre	Porirua Station	Tranzit Group	Mon-Sun	
220	Ascot Park	Ascot Park	Cannons Creek, Porirua Station, Porirua City Centre	Titahi Bay – Gloaming Hill	Tranzit Group	Mon-Sun	High-frequency service (every 15 minutes) between Ascot Park and city centre, half-hourly to Titahi Bay.
226	Elsdon – Sievers Grove	Elsdon	Porirua City Centre, Porirua Station, Cannons Creek	Sievers Grove	Tranzit Group	Mon-Sat	
230	Whitby (The Crowsnest)	Whitby – The Crowsnest	Spinnaker Drive, Aotea College, Porirua City Centre	Porirua Station	Tranzit Group	Mon-Sun	
236	Whitby (Navigation Drive)	Whitby – Navigation Drive	Whitby Lakes, Oak Avenue, Royal New Zealand Police College, Porirua City Centre	Porirua Station	Tranzit Group	Mon-Sun	Some peak-only trips run from Whitby to Paremata station.
300	Whenua Tapu Cemetery	Titahi Bay – Richard St	Porirua City Centre, Porirua Station, Cannons Creek, Waitangirua Mall	Whenua Tapu Cemetery	Tranzit Group	Last Sunday of every month.	

=== Kāpiti Coast routes ===
Kāpiti Coast services are separated from the other urban areas. Paraparaumu services usually terminate at Paraparaumu station, connecting with Kāpiti Line trains, and travel via Coastlands Shopping Centre. Waikanae and Ōtaki services leave from Waikanae station, connecting with Kāpiti Line trains there. Previously, Kāpiti Coast services (apart from Ōtaki services) were operated entirely by Mana Coach Services.

Route	Route name	Start	Via	End	Operator	Days of operation	Notes
250	Raumati South	Paraparaumu Station	Coastlands Shopping Centre, Raumati Beach	Raumati South – Poplar Avenue	Uzabus	Mon-Sun	
251	Paekākāriki	Paraparaumu Health Centre	Paraparaumu Station, Coastlands Shopping Centre, Poplar Ave	Paekākāriki	Uzabus	Tuesdays, Thursdays, and Fridays.	
260	Raumati Beach	Paraparaumu Station	Coastlands Shopping Centre, Paraparaumu Beach Shops	Raumati Beach	Uzabus	Mon-Sun	
261	Paraparaumu Beach via Guildford Dr	Paraparaumu Station	Coastlands Shopping Centre, Guildford Dr	Paraparaumu Beach Shops	Uzabus	Mon-Sun	
262	Paraparaumu Beach via Mazengarb Rd	Paraparaumu Station	Coastlands Shopping Centre, Paraparaumu College	Paraparaumu Beach	Uzabus	Mon-Sun	
264	Paraparaumu East	Paraparaumu Health Centre	Paraparaumu Station, Coastlands Shopping Centre	Paraparaumu East – Riwai St.	Uzabus	Mondays and Wednesdays.	
280	Waikanae Beach	Waikanae Station	Te Moana Rd, Waimea Rd, Reeves St	Waikanae Beach	Uzabus	Mon-Sun	Some services extend to Paraparaumu on Mon-Fri.
281	Waikanae Town Loop	Waikanae Station	Winara Ave, Waikanae Pool	Waikanae Station	Uzabus	Mon-Sun	
290	Ōtaki	Waikanae Station	Ōtaki, Te Manuao Rd, Mill Rd, Rangiuru Rd, Marine Pde, Koromiko St	Ōtaki Beach	Uzabus	Mon-Sun	Runs as a loop from Waikanae Station. Some services extend to Paraparaumu on Mon-Fri.
291	Waikanae – Levin	Waikanae Station	Ōtaki, Manakau	Levin	Uzabus	Tuesdays and Thursdays.	Run in partnership with Horizons Regional Council.

=== After Midnight routes ===
Night services run on Saturday and Sunday mornings, outside normal bus hours. Route numbers are prefixed with the letter N, and route names are prefixed with "After Midnight".

All services are one-way going out of central Wellington, except N8 which runs one-way from Lower Hutt to Wellington

Route	Route name	Operator
N1	After Midnight Island Bay/Lyall Bay	Tranzit Group
N4	After Midnight Khandallah	Tranzit Group
N5	After Midnight Newlands	Newlands Coach Services
N6	After Midnight Porirua	Uzabus
N8	After Midnight to Wellington City	Tranzit Group
N22	After Midnight Stokes Valley/Upper Hutt	Tranzit Group
N66	After Midnight Wainuiomata	Tranzit Group
N88	After Midnight Eastbourne	NZ Bus
