= Greytown Branch =

Railway line in New Zealand

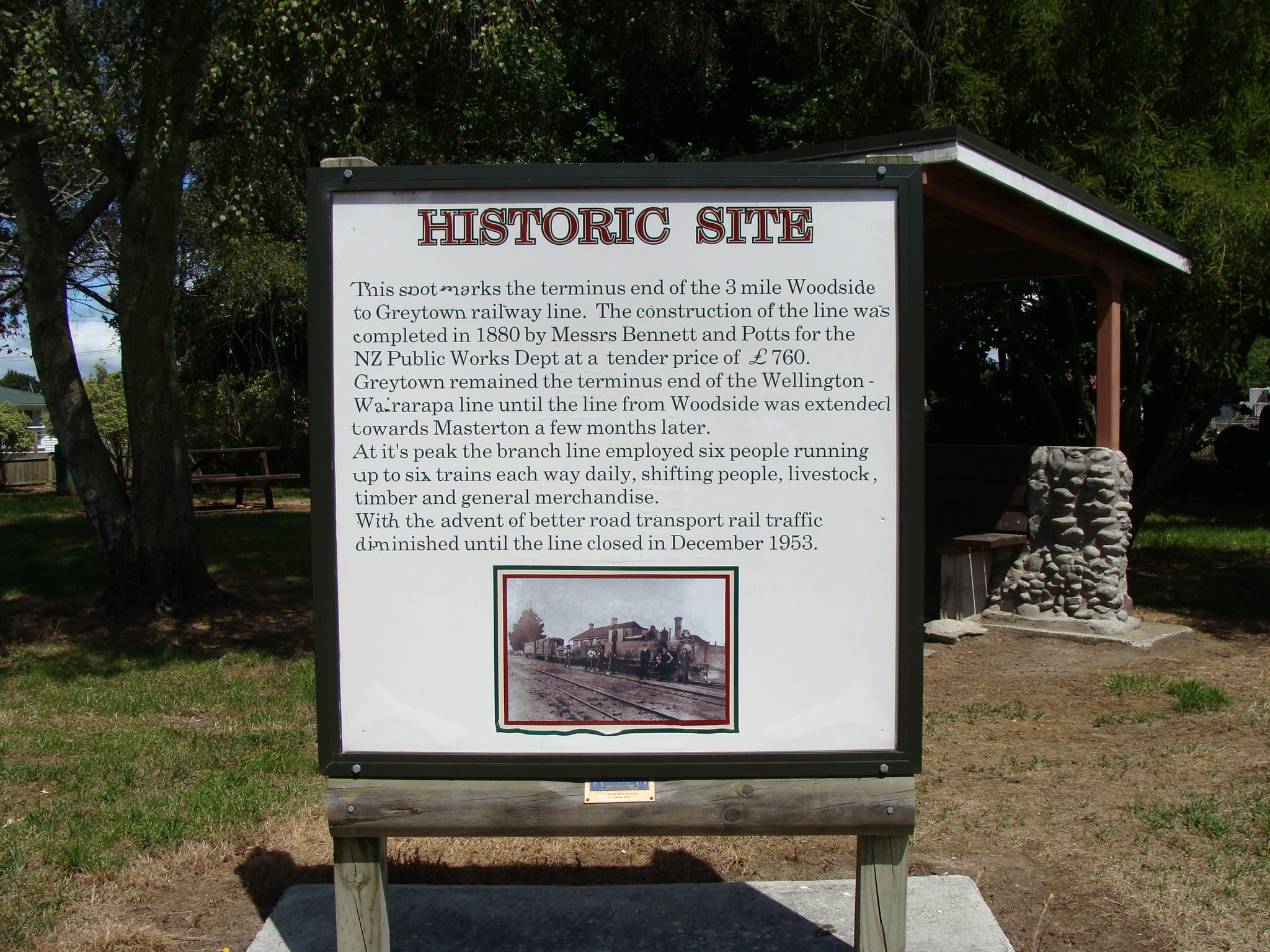
- End of the line.

Overview
- Status: Closed
- Owner: Railways Department
- Locale: Wairarapa, New Zealand
- Termini: Woodside Junction; Greytown
- Stations: 2

Service
- Type: regional rail
- System: New Zealand Government Railways (NZGR)
- Operator(s): Railways Department

History
- Opened: 14 May 1880
- Closed: 24 December 1953

Technical
- Line length: 5 km (3.1 mi)
- Number of tracks: Single
- Character: Rural
- Track gauge: 3 ft 6 in (1,067 mm)

Map

The Greytown Branch was a five-kilometre 3 ft 6 in (1,067 mm) branch line railway off the Wairarapa Line at Woodside in the Wairarapa district of New Zealand's North Island. It followed an almost straight course over flat terrain. There were no intermediate stations.

== History ==
=== Construction ===
On learning that the Wairarapa Line was to bypass Greytown, its residents sent several deputations to meet engineers of the Public Works Department to persuade them to change the route, but to no avail. In order to placate them, the Public Works Department offered to investigate the possibility of constructing a branch line to connect the town to the main line. Initial investigations concluded costs would be reasonable, and a survey was carried out in 1876. However, because of the Department's focus on other projects then underway, no further work on the idea was done at the time.

In 1878, the project was again promoted and this time authorised. A second survey was conducted in January 1879, with design work completed and tenders for the formation and buildings called for in June of that year. The successful contractor for the formation completed the work between 11 November 1879 and 10 January 1880. Two separate contracts were let, for the Greytown station buildings and for fencing the right of way. Both these contracts were completed on time.

=== Operation ===
The first scheduled services ran on 14 May 1880, a morning and afternoon mixed return service between Wellington and Greytown, an extension of the existing services between Wellington and Featherston, an extra 35 minutes being allocated for the extra distance. A locomotive, usually a member of the L class, was based at Greytown.

Initial traffic on the branch was reported to be "very satisfactory"; while certainly the case for goods traffic, it is doubtful that this applied to passenger traffic with an average of four passengers per train.

The only excursion train from Greytown transported picnickers, including many children, to Cross Creek on 29 May 1880. It was found that the destination was not suitable, and a suggestion for the next excursion to take revellers to Kaitoke never went ahead.

Four months after opening tenders were called for the branch to be worked by horses: with traffic already declining it was considered too expensive for a locomotive. When no tenders were forthcoming, the department based its smallest locomotive at Greytown.

Despite traffic not meeting expectations, Greytown handled around 6,000 outward passengers and 2,000 tons of freight annually for many years. With the erection of stock yards, livestock traffic started at 160 pigs and 15 sheep, and these numbers grew substantially. Beef cattle were not conveyed in notable numbers until many years later.

In the fiscal year ended 31 March 1884, 6,386 passenger fares were issued at Greytown, while freight traffic had risen to 4,721 tons outward and 1,051 tons inward. Consigned livestock rose gradually at first, but increased rapidly in the early 1900s to peak at more than 13,000 head in 1909-1910. This traffic remained high until the introduction of lorry transport in the 1920s, but was always a minor player in the livestock trade compared with Masterton, Carterton, and Featherston.

Passenger traffic never reached expectations. The population of the town grew rapidly in the 1870s, but the extension of the railway from Woodside to Masterton on 1 November 1880, making the Greytown line a branch line, helped Masterton become the dominant town in the district. Between 1905 and 1915 trains between Greytown and Woodside were increased to six return trains daily, Monday to Saturday. Thereafter the number of trains fluctuated: in 1946 five were scheduled, and by 1952 this had been cut to two. Though by this time there was still a passenger car attached to the train, few passengers were carried (often none), and the trains only infrequently hauled freight wagons. The last train ran on 24 December 1953.

A single-stall engine shed was the home for the locomotive that worked the branch, with a variety of locomotives serving in this capacity. In the early years, the job was handled by an L or NZR D class (1874)class (2-4-0T), and occasionally by a [NZR C class (1873) class. Later, two 1903-built L class (4-4-2T] locomotives were allocated to the branch, alternately based at Greytown and Cross Creek, being swapped as required. In the late 1930s they were replaced by W^{F} class 2-6-4T locomotives, both of which were converted for one-man operation. In its heyday the branch had six staff, but reductions in 1931 pared this back to one, who was stationmaster, porter, shunter, guard, and general factotum. As the branch had only one locomotive in steam at any time, the only signal was a home signal protecting Woodside.

=== Demise ===
The branch narrowly avoided closure after the 1931 Royal Commission, and despite attempts to encourage more trade traffic continued to decline. During its last years it received little in the way of maintenance. The end for the branch came after the 1952 Royal Commission. With revenue not covering even a tenth of the running costs, the decision to close was made after 73 years of operation. The rails were lifted and sold in 1954. The locomotive shed was sold and the station building moved to Woodside to begin a new life as a goods shed.

== Today ==
The only remnants of the terminus are the goods shed and loading bank. For much of its length the formation is marked by fences and rows of trees.

The former railway formation between Cotter Street, Greytown and Woodside has been developed as a walkway and cycleway, mainly for recreational use, but also for the benefit of commuters accessing rail services at Woodside Railway Station. This was possible, in part, because the route has "paper road" status. A group of local residents advocating the idea submitted a proposal to the Greytown Community Board which was subsequently approved after landowners along the route consented to the use of their land for the project. The trail was built using volunteer labour, with the first stage from Cotter Street to Woodside Road opening on 6 November 2011. After securing funding of $30,000 towards the completion of the second stage from Woodside Road to Woodside Station, it was opened on 3 February 2013 completing the Greytown – Woodside link.

== Gallery ==
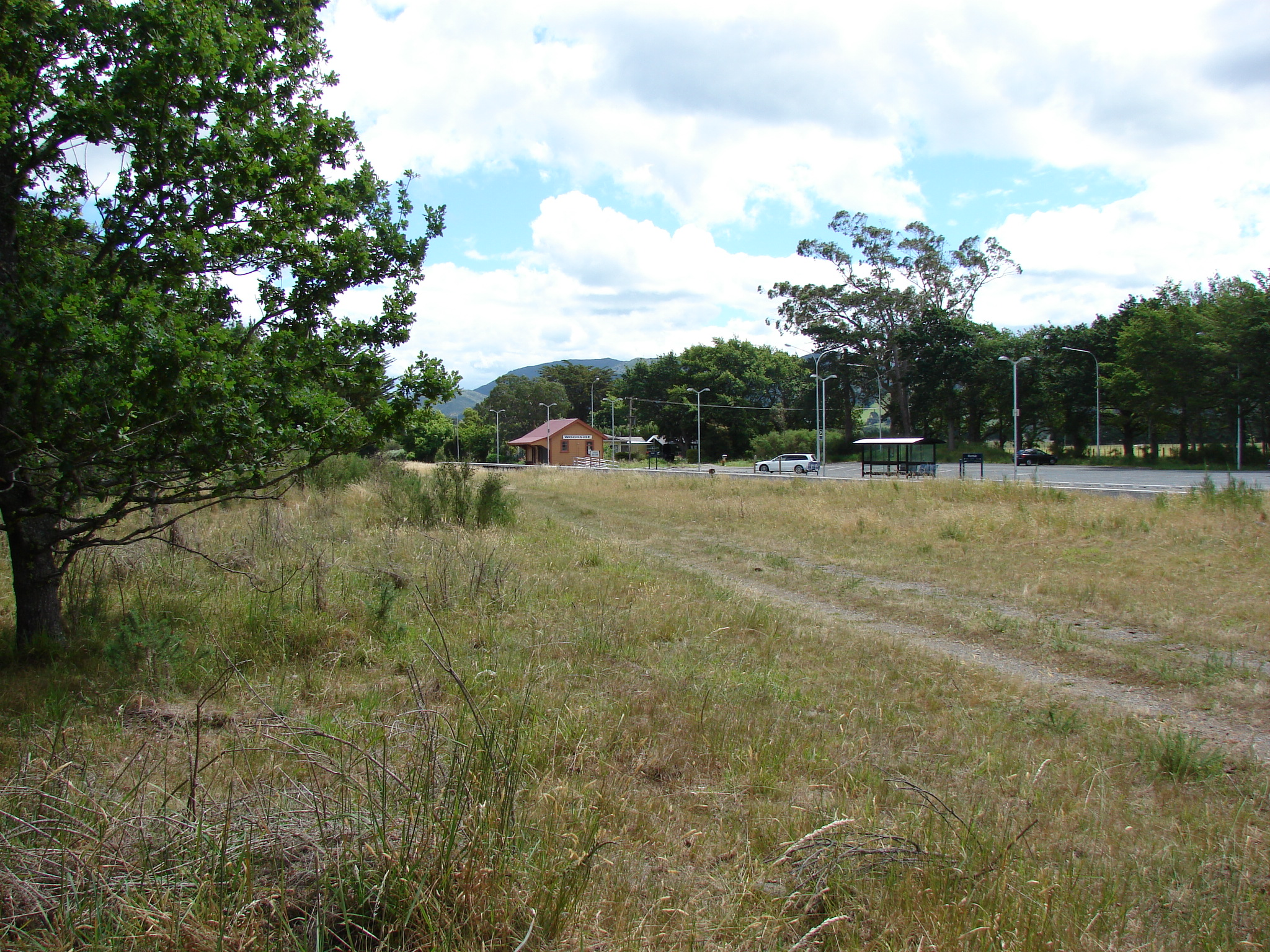
The approach into Woodside yard from the Greytown Branch.

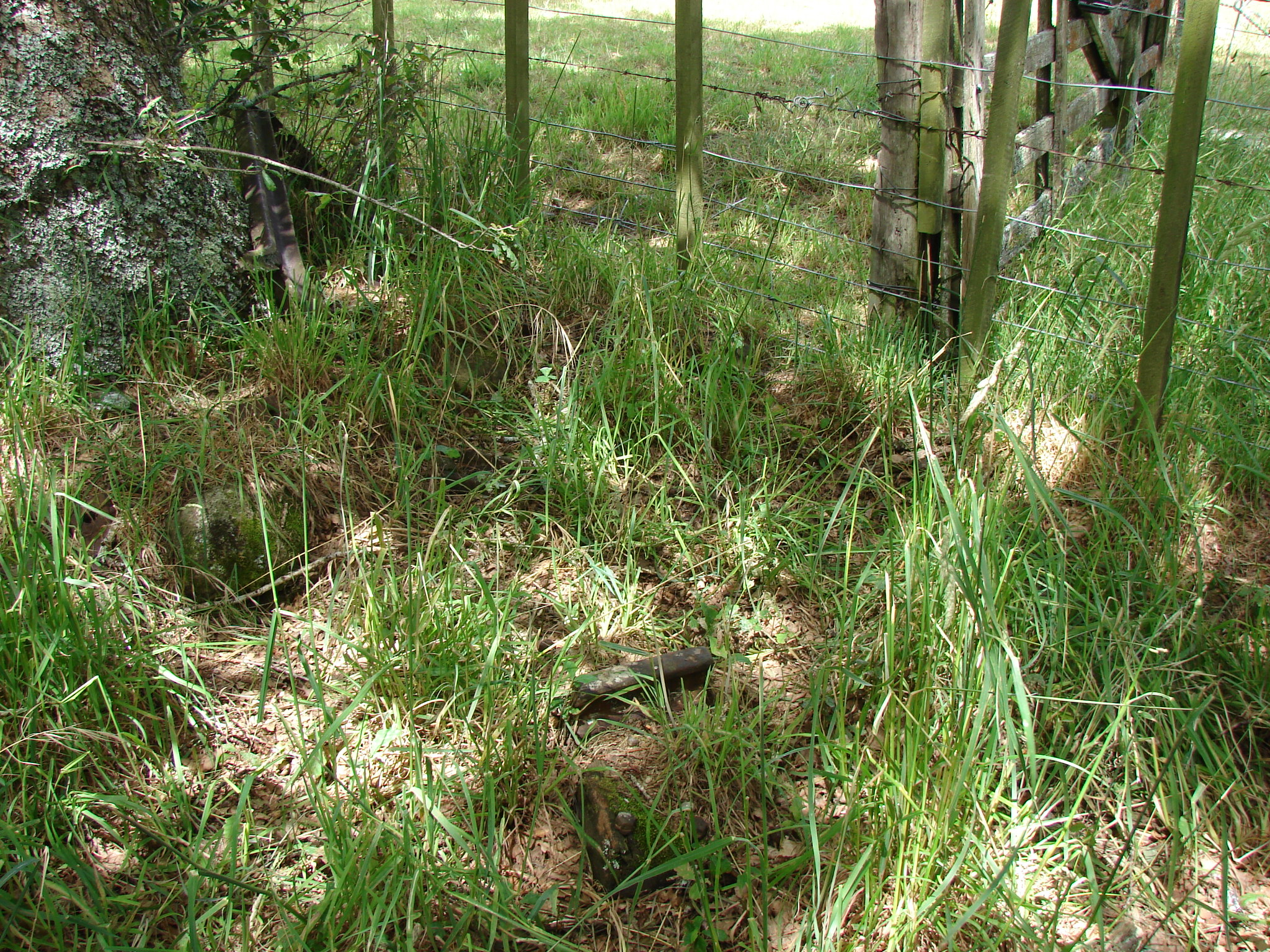
Some railway remnants near where the line entered Woodside yard.

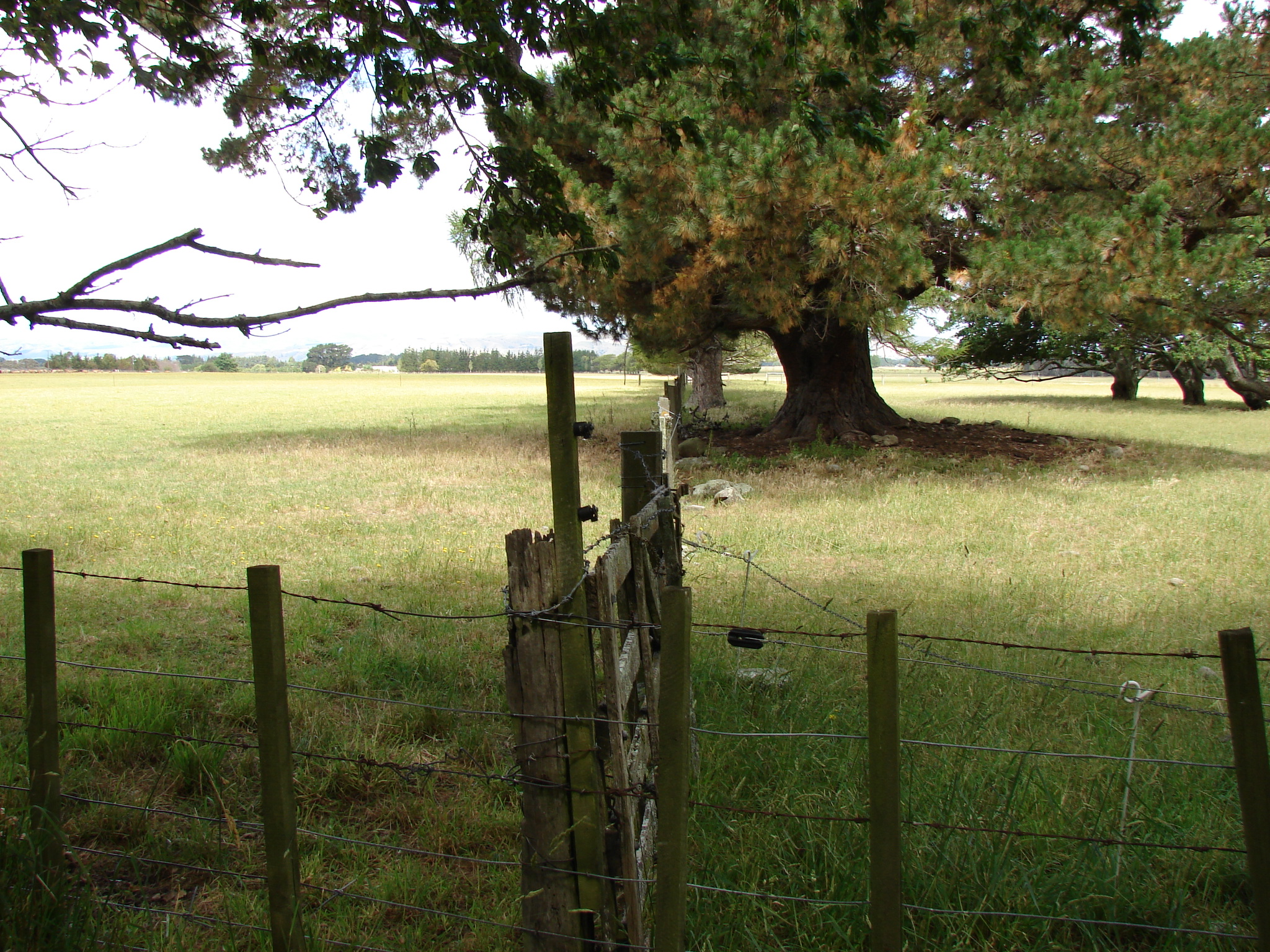
The fence line (away from the camera, centre) follows the route of the Greytown Branch into Woodside yard.

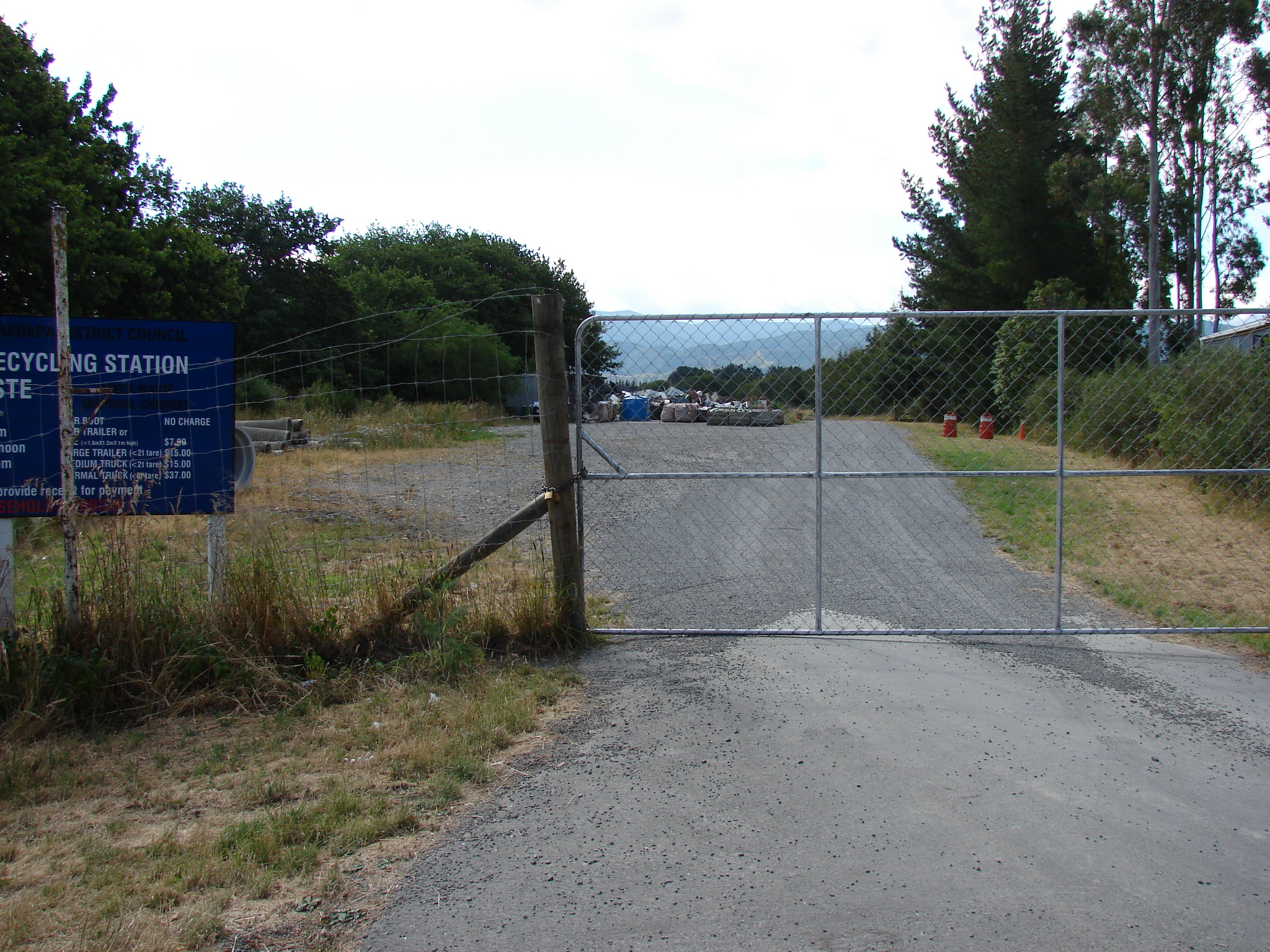
A South Wairarapa District Council recycling station is now on the formation at the edge of Greytown.

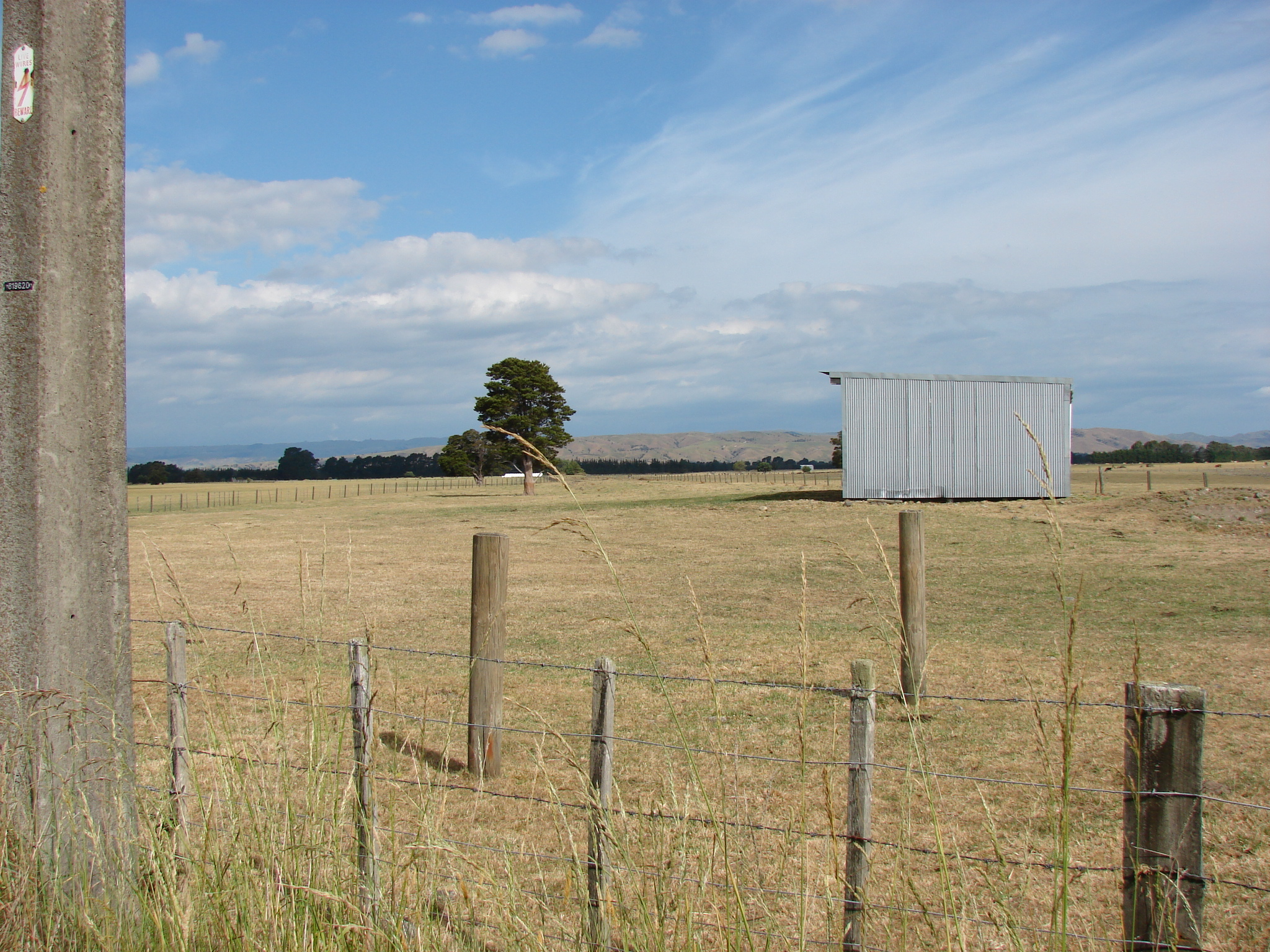
A shed has been erected on the formation near Woodside Road, where the line was closest to the road.

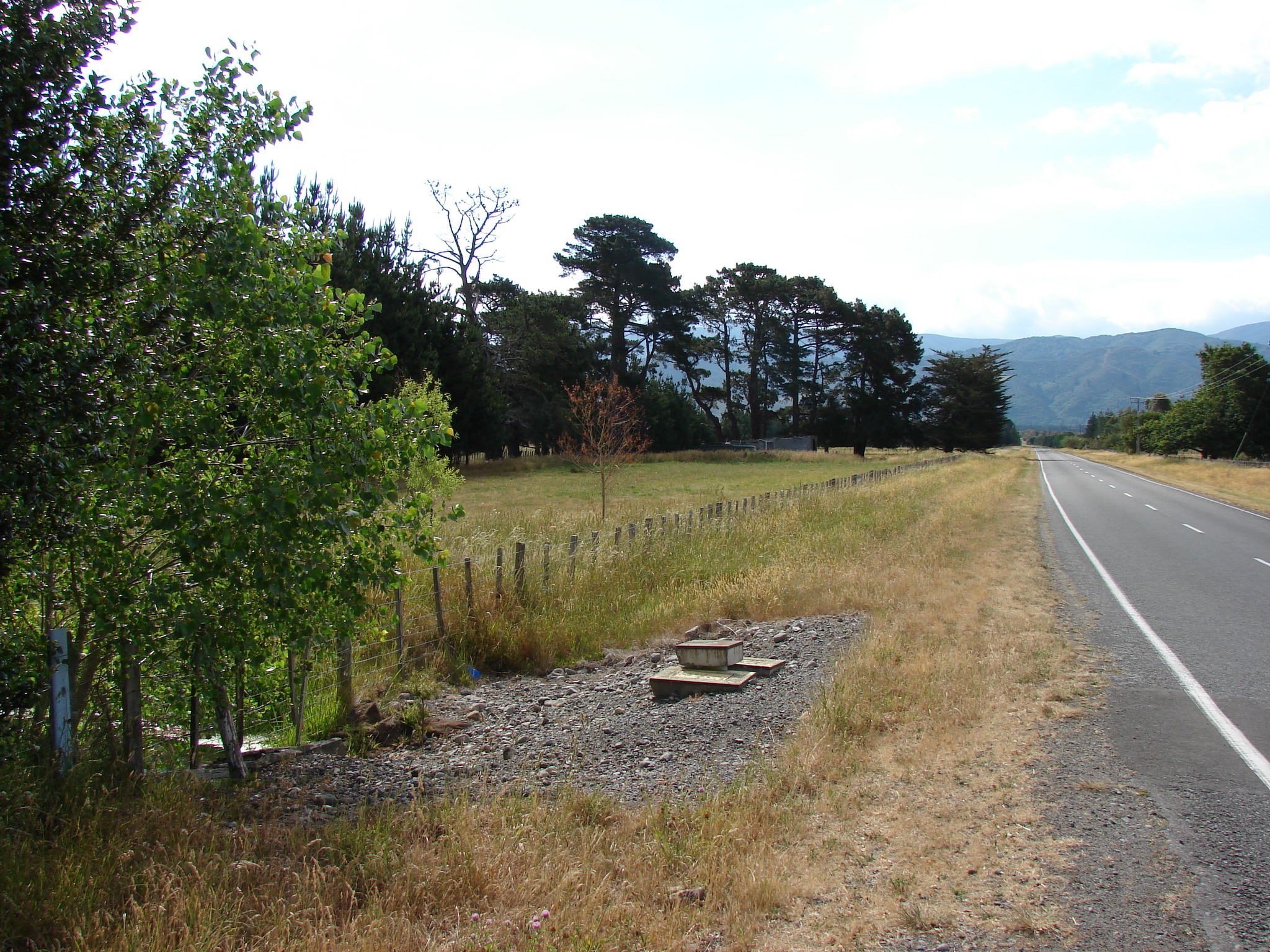
A row of trees beside Woodside Road marks the formation at its closest point to the road.

== See also ==
- Martinborough Branch
