= Greytown railway station =

Defunct railway station in New Zealand

Greytown
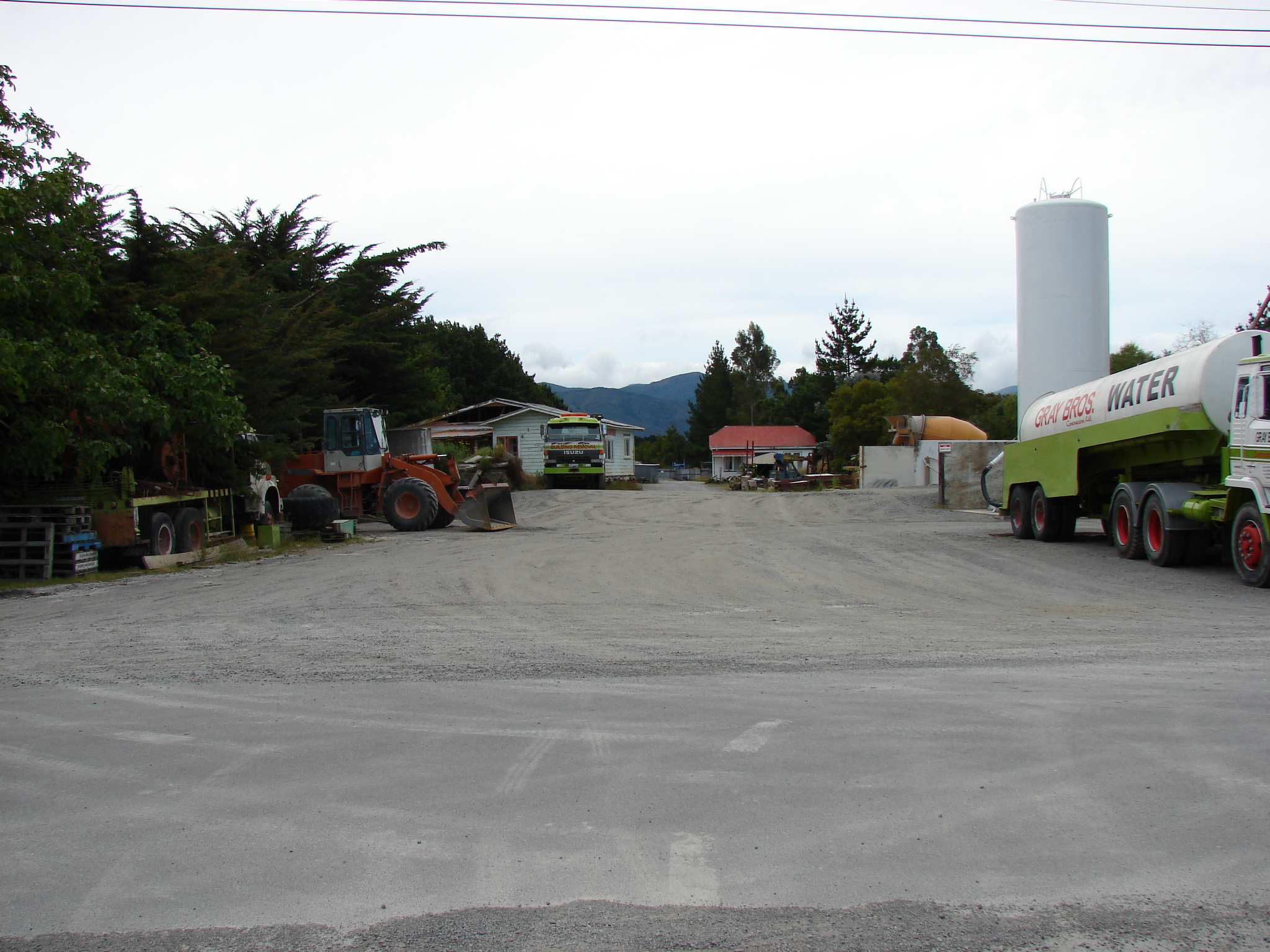
- Greytown station yard in 2006. The station building and platform were to the left, where the large trees are.

General information
- Location: 230 West Street, Greytown
- Coordinates: 41°5′20″S 175°26′55″E
- System: New Zealand Government Railways Department regional rail
- Owner: Railways Department
- Line: Greytown Branch
- Platforms: Single
- Tracks: 1 branch line, 2 loops

History
- Opened: 14 May 1880
- Closed: 24 December 1953, on closure of the Greytown Branch line
Location
Notes
Previous station	Woodside Station
Next station	none

Greytown railway station was the terminus of the Greytown Branch railway, which connected the Wairarapa town of Greytown in New Zealand’s North Island to Woodside on the Wairarapa Line.

== History ==
In 1878, Parliament authorised the construction of the Greytown Branch, and the following year, after the completion of a survey, plans were drawn up and tenders called. The contract for the construction of the Greytown station building, goods shed and locomotive shed was let to Ebenezer Gray for £1,183 (equivalent to £164,437 in 2024). Construction was completed on time.

The opening of the line on 14 May 1880 was to have been a grand affair, with a parade led by a brass band, followed by local charitable societies, schools, children and the general public. These festivities were to have been followed by sporting events including teams from Wellington and Greytown. Foul weather on the day meant that much of what had been planned was cancelled, and the first train from Wellington brought few visitors.

Until the opening to Masterton on 1 November 1880, Greytown was the effective northern terminus of the Wairarapa Line. The Greytown to Woodside section then became a branch railway.

== Today ==
With the closure of the Greytown Branch in 1953, the locomotive shed was demolished and the station building was relocated by train to Woodside to serve as a goods shed, where it remains. The station's goods shed survives on its original site. Though there have been proposals to move it to the railway heritage precinct at Carterton railway station, it was restored in 2015 to a condition reminiscent of its appearance in commercial service.

The station yard is at the southern end of West Street in Greytown, and is noticeable by the large hump in the road as one passes the goods shed. A road transport company and row of large trees now occupy much of the yard and where the station building used to be.

== Gallery ==
External images
- Greytown station photograph from Alexander Turnbull Library
- a train at Greytown station
- Greytown station building and platform
- a train at Greytown station with crew and other railways staff
- tank locomotive WF 398 at Greytown station

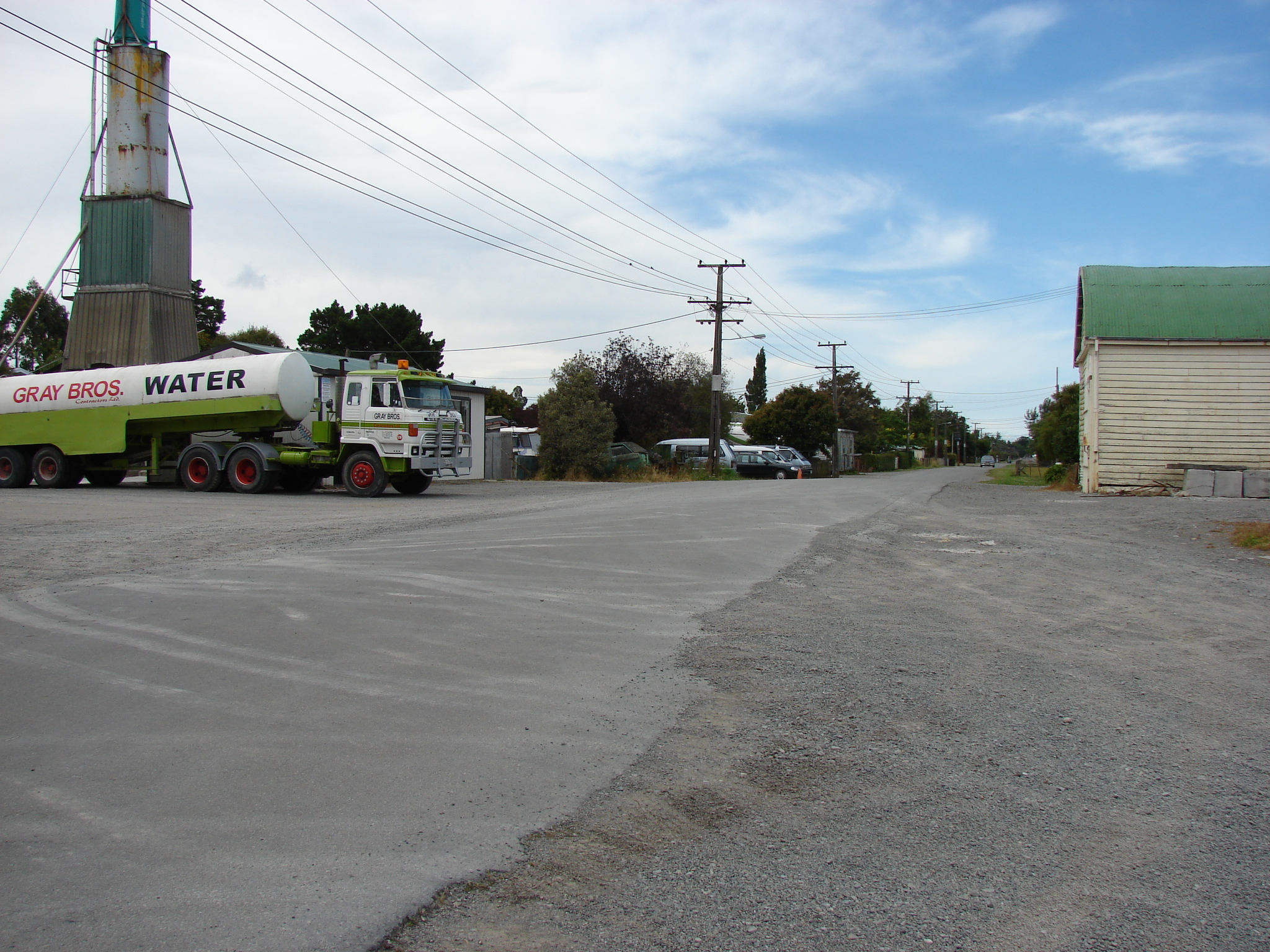
Looking north-east along West Street, with the site of the station building and platform to the left and the goods shed to the right.

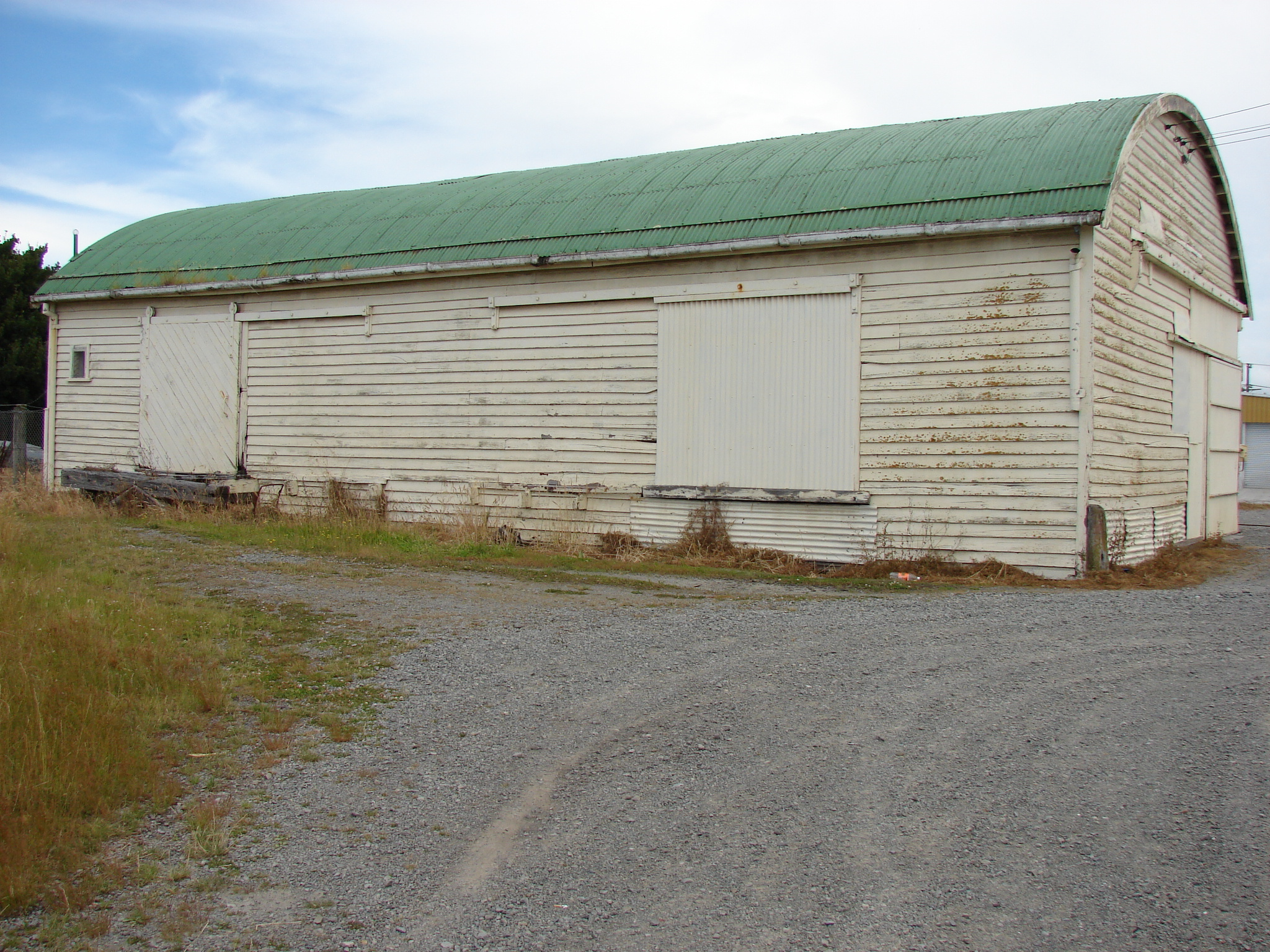
The goods shed.

Preceded by Woodside	Stations on the Greytown Branch	Succeeded by Terminus
