= Woodside railway station, Wellington Region =

Railway station in New Zealand

Woodside
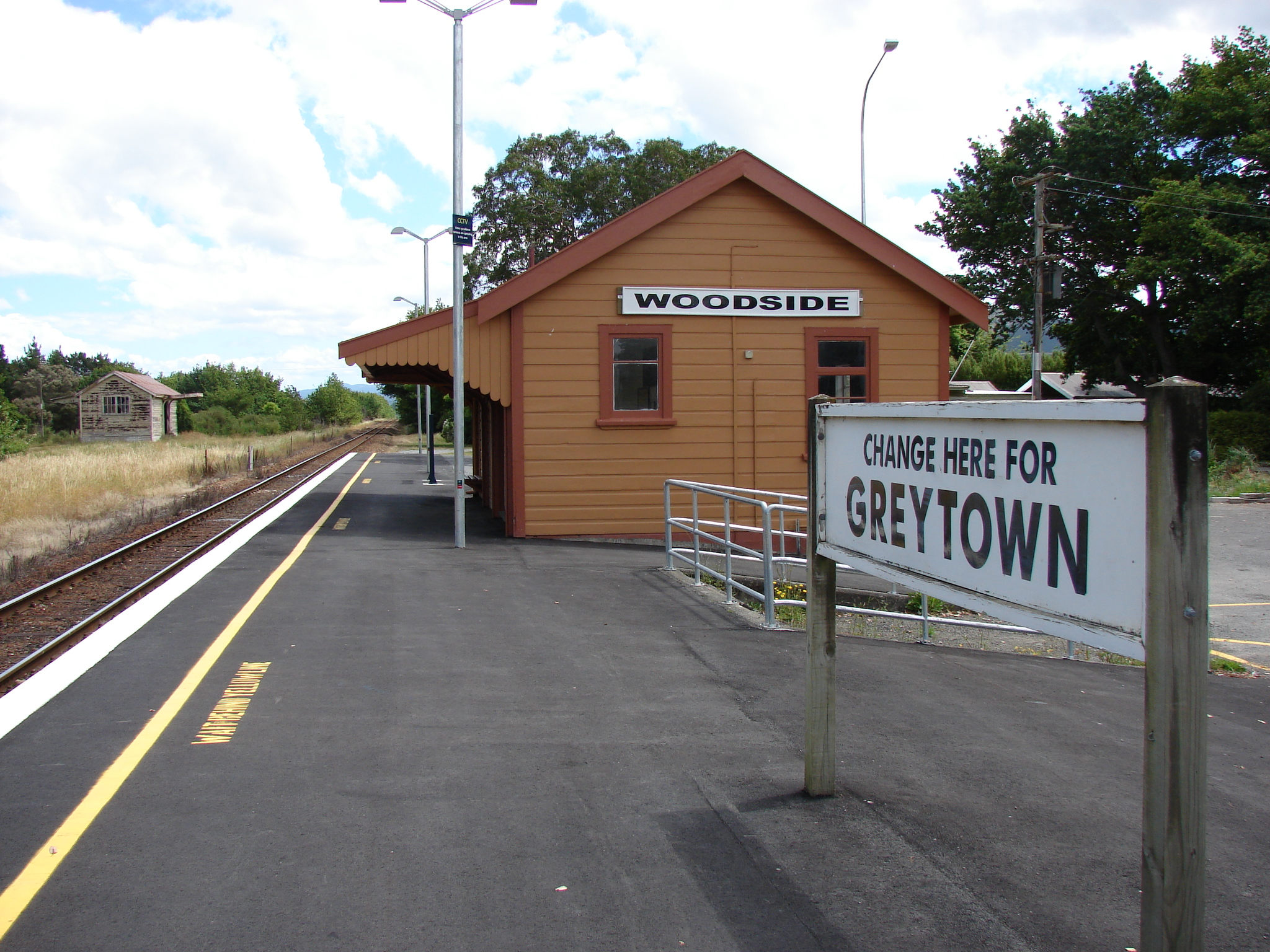
- Woodside Station in December 2007.

General information
- Location: Wallace Street, Woodside, New Zealand
- Coordinates: 41°4′2.61″S 175°24′7.05″E
- Elevation: 91 metres (299 ft)
- System: Metlink regional rail
- Owner: Greater Wellington Regional Council
- Line: Wairarapa Line
- Distance: 65.12 kilometres (40.46 mi) from Wellington
- Platforms: Single side (originally Island)
- Tracks: 1 main line
- Train operators: Tranz Metro
- Bus routes: 1
- Bus operators: Tranzit Coachlines
- Connections: 204 Woodside Station - Greytown

Construction
- Structure type: At-grade
- Parking: Yes
- Cycle facilities: No
- Architectural style: Vogel era Special Class

Other information
- Station code: WOOD
- Fare zone: 12

History
- Opened: 14 May 1880; 146 years ago
- Former names: Woodside Junction

Passengers
- 2011: >168 passengers/day

Services
Preceding station	Transdev Wellington	Following station
Matarawa towards Masterton	Wairarapa Connection	Featherston towards Wellington
Location
Notes
- Previous Station: Fernside Station; Next Station (Wairarapa Line): Matarawa Station; Next Station (Greytown Branch): Greytown Station

Woodside railway station is a rural railway station located in the Wellington region, 5 km west of and serving Greytown, New Zealand. The station is located on the Wairarapa Line, 65.1 km (40.5 mi) north of Wellington and 25.9 km (16.1 mi) south of Masterton. The Wairarapa Connection serves the station several times daily with services to Wellington and Masterton, by the Wairarapa Connection.

The station building has in recent years been restored by the Woodside Station Preservation Society.

== History ==
The original survey for the Wairarapa Line, completed in 1876, considered two routes for the line between Featherston and Masterton: the Central route and the Western route. Despite the protestations of the residents of Greytown, the Western route was chosen due to concerns about the possibility of flooding north of Greytown, which meant that the line bypassed Greytown and passed through Woodside instead.

Woodside opened on 14 May 1880 with the extension of the line from Featherston. Until the line from Woodside to Masterton was completed and opened in November of that year, Woodside was the northern terminus of the Wairarapa Line and was operated by the Public Works Department, initially with two mixed trains between Greytown and Wellington each day.

The amenities at Woodside initially consisted of a station building and stationmaster's house. The station building was on an island platform between the main line and the Greytown Branch, with the junction at the southern end of the platform. There was road access from north of the platform. The branch (eastern) side had two loops, with capacities of 18 and 11 wagons, while on the main line (western) side there were two loops with capacities of 44 and 35 wagons.

Some years after the closure of the Greytown Branch in 1953 the main line yard was removed, and the station building relocated to a new platform on the western side of the main line. A new crossing loop was installed, and the branch sidings reconfigured. In 1954 the Greytown station building was relocated to Woodside and modified to serve as a goods shed. It is now disused and the loop and sidings have been removed.

With the opening of the line to Masterton and the reversion of the line to Greytown to branch-line status, Woodside became known as Woodside Junction until the closure of the Greytown Branch in 1953: the platform name board read "Woodside Junction. Change here for Greytown."

A Wairarapa train was struck by a tree branch on 17 September 2019 near the Waiohine Bridge, but the driver continued and stopped at Woodside Station.

== Services ==
There are five Metlink Wairarapa Connection trains both ways on Monday to Thursday, six on Friday and two each way on Saturday and Sunday.

A shuttle bus service to Greytown, Route 204, connects with trains. It is operated by Tranzit Coachlines for Metlink, and operates Monday to Saturday (it does not operate on Sundays or public holidays).

Previous Stop	Metlink Bus Services	Next Stop
Terminus	204; Woodside Station - Greytown	Woodside Road towards Greytown

== Gallery ==
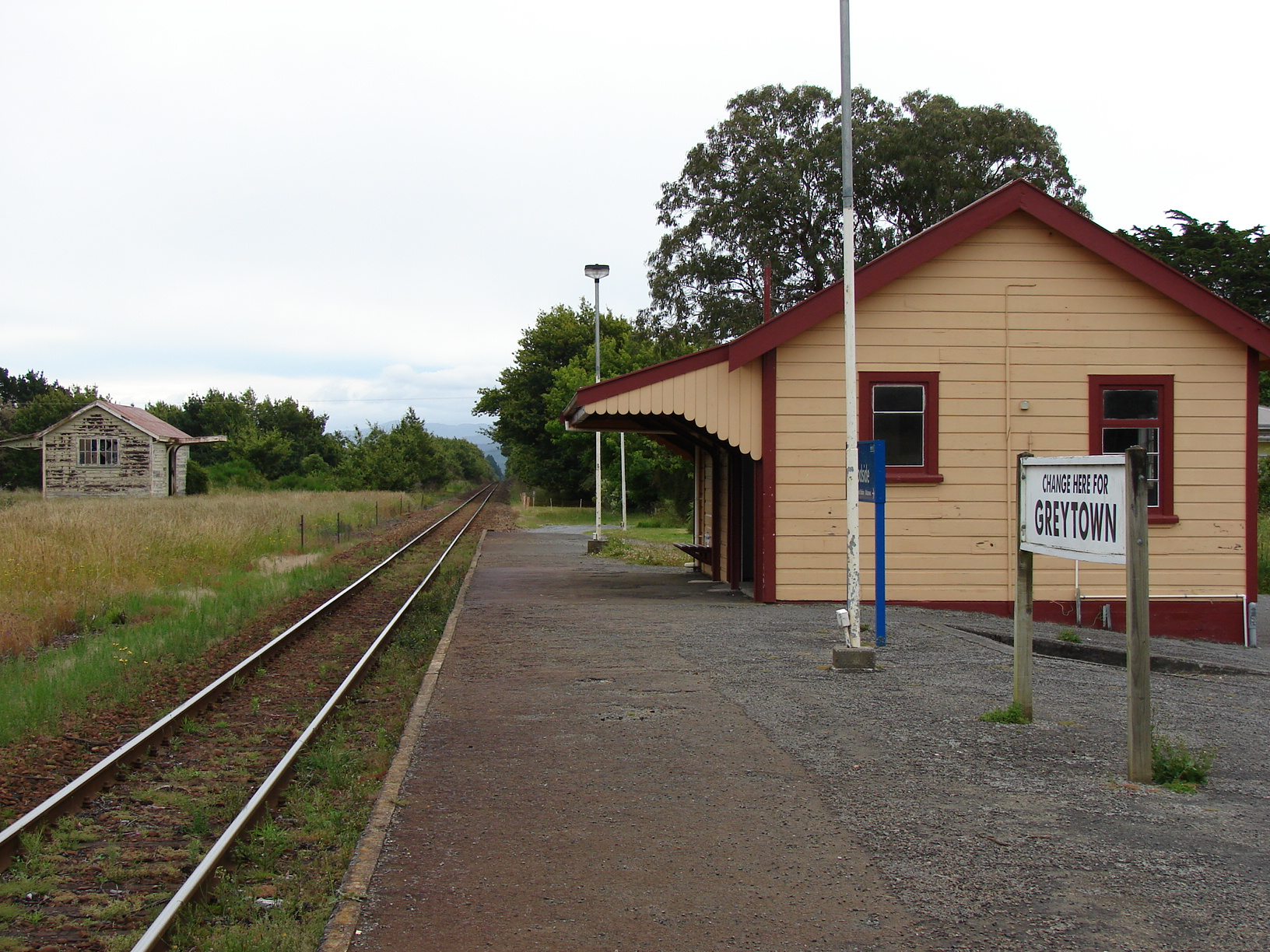
Railway station

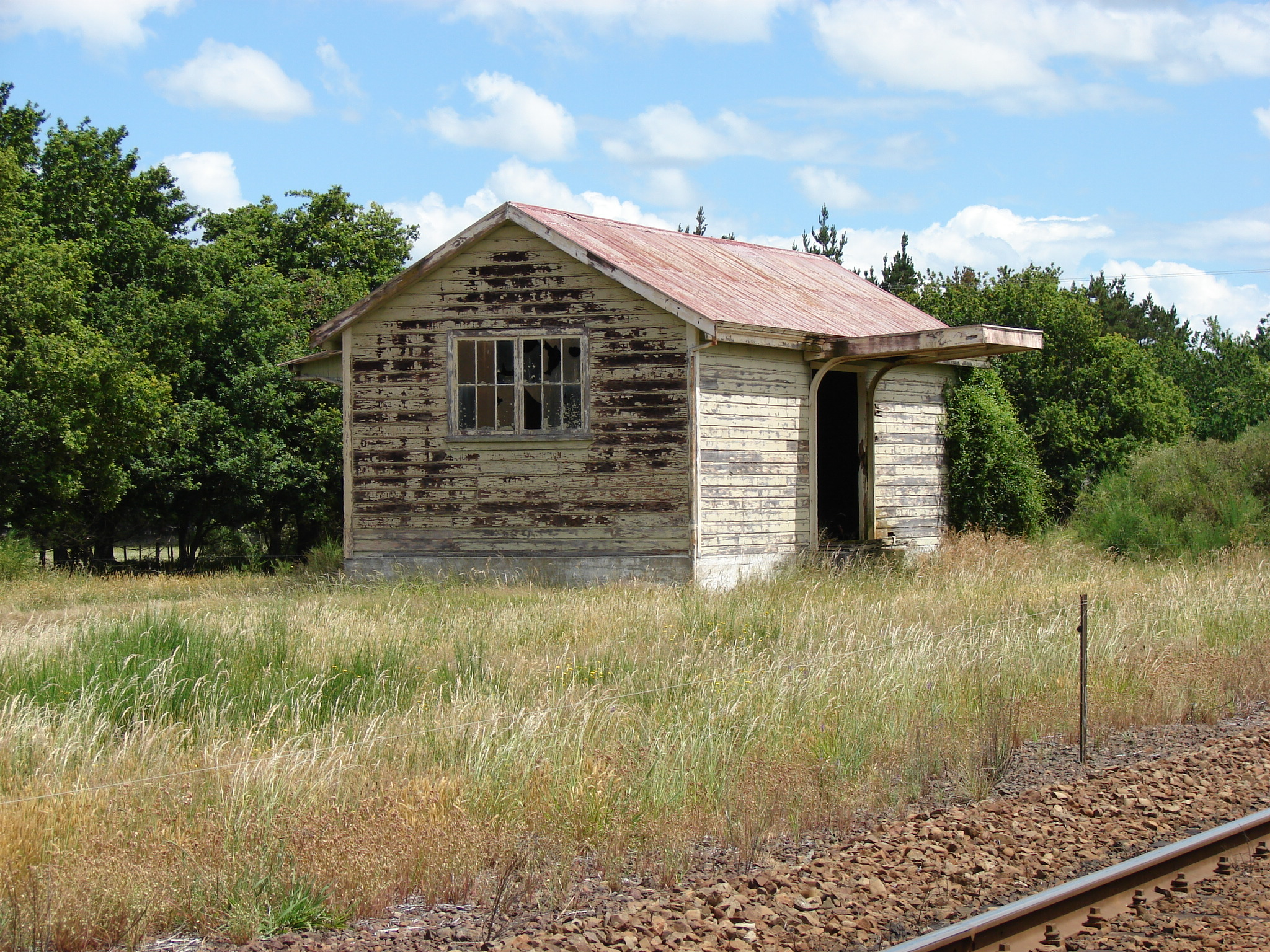
Disused goods shed (ex Greytown railway station)

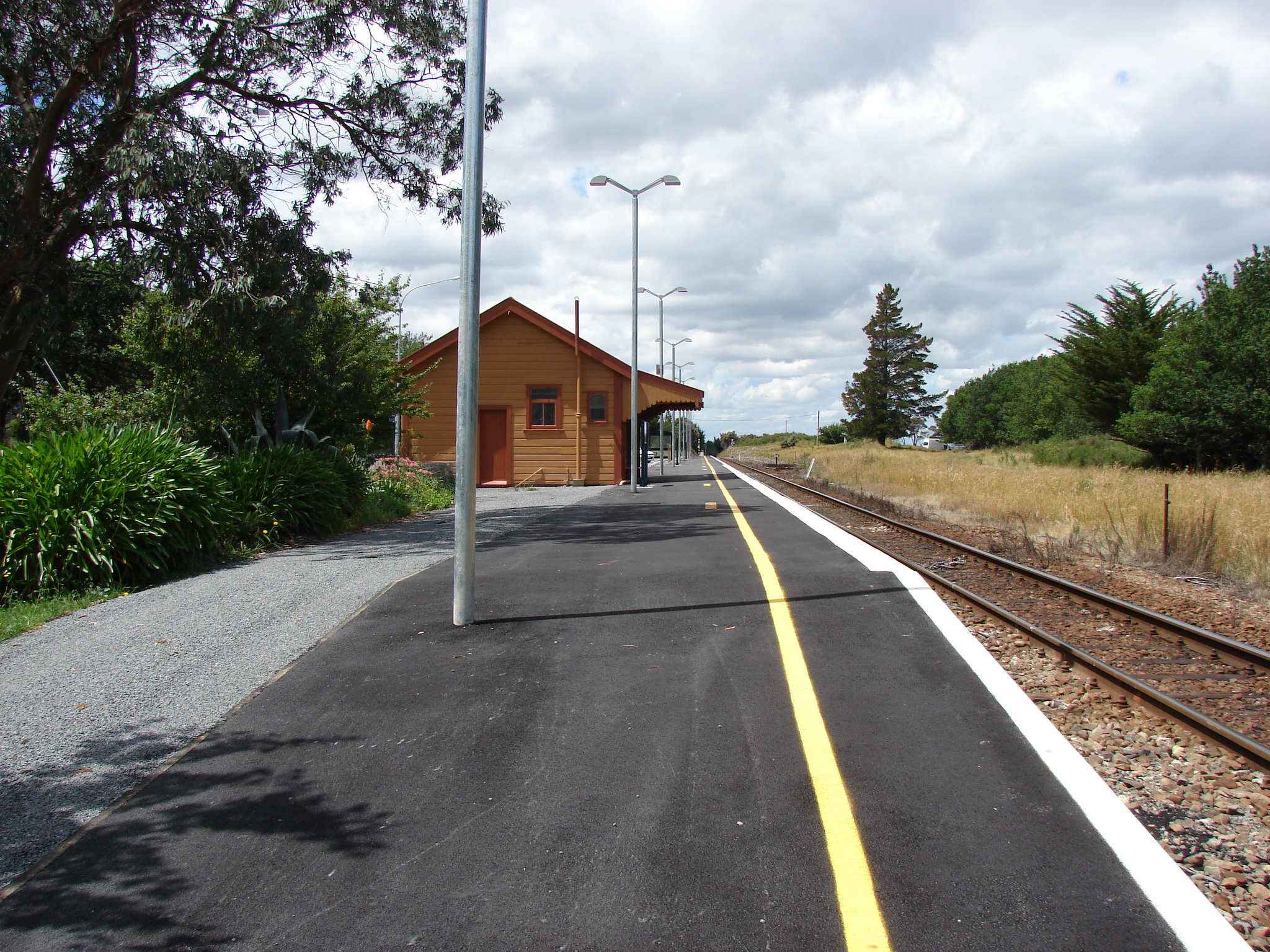
The station platform was significantly augmented as part of the 2007 Wairarapa station upgrade programme.

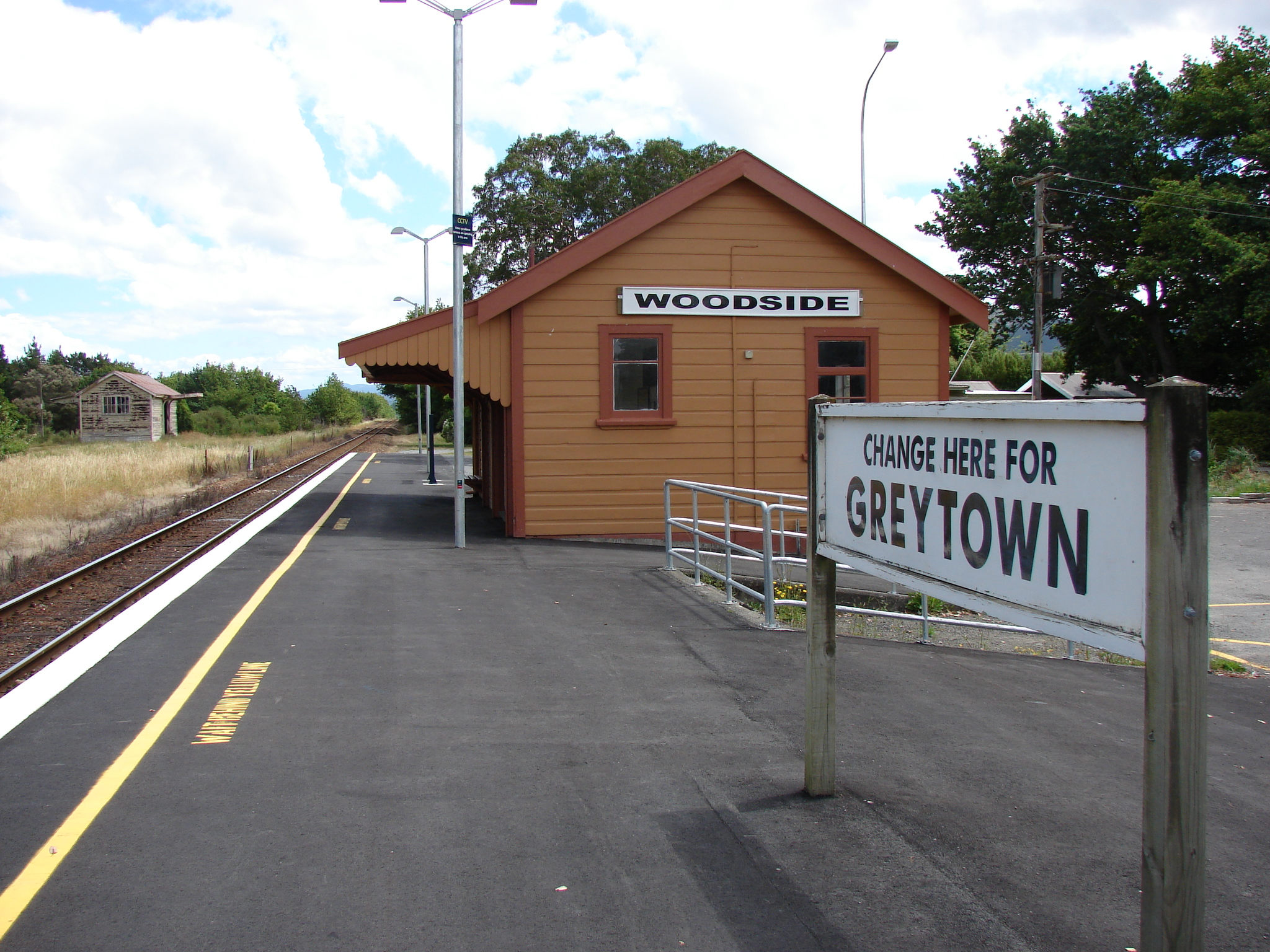
A reminder of bygone days. The original Woodside station building and a platform signboard that is reminiscent of the one that was on the original island platform, which read: "Woodside Junction. Change here for Greytown."

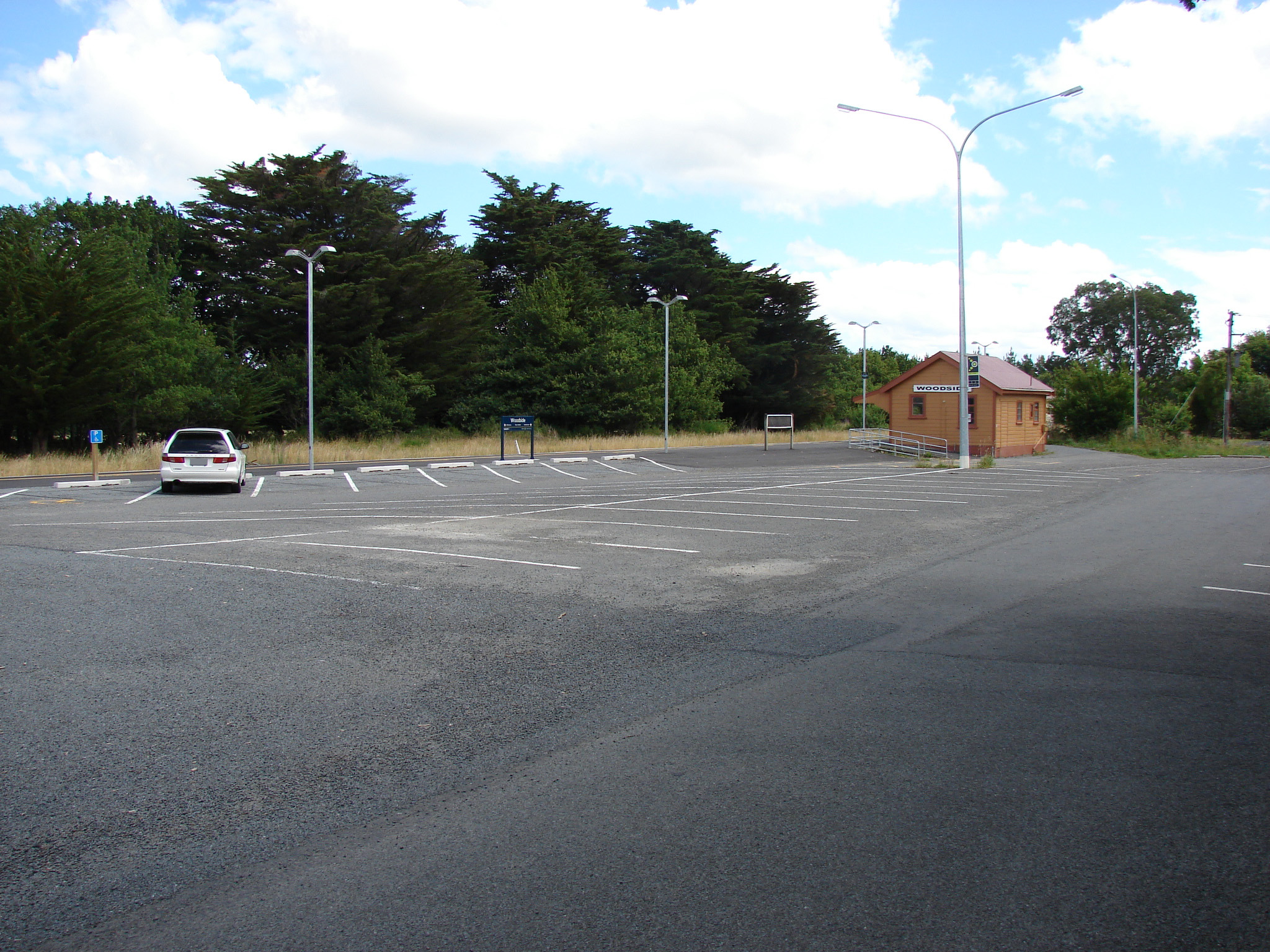
An ample carpark is provided for commuters.

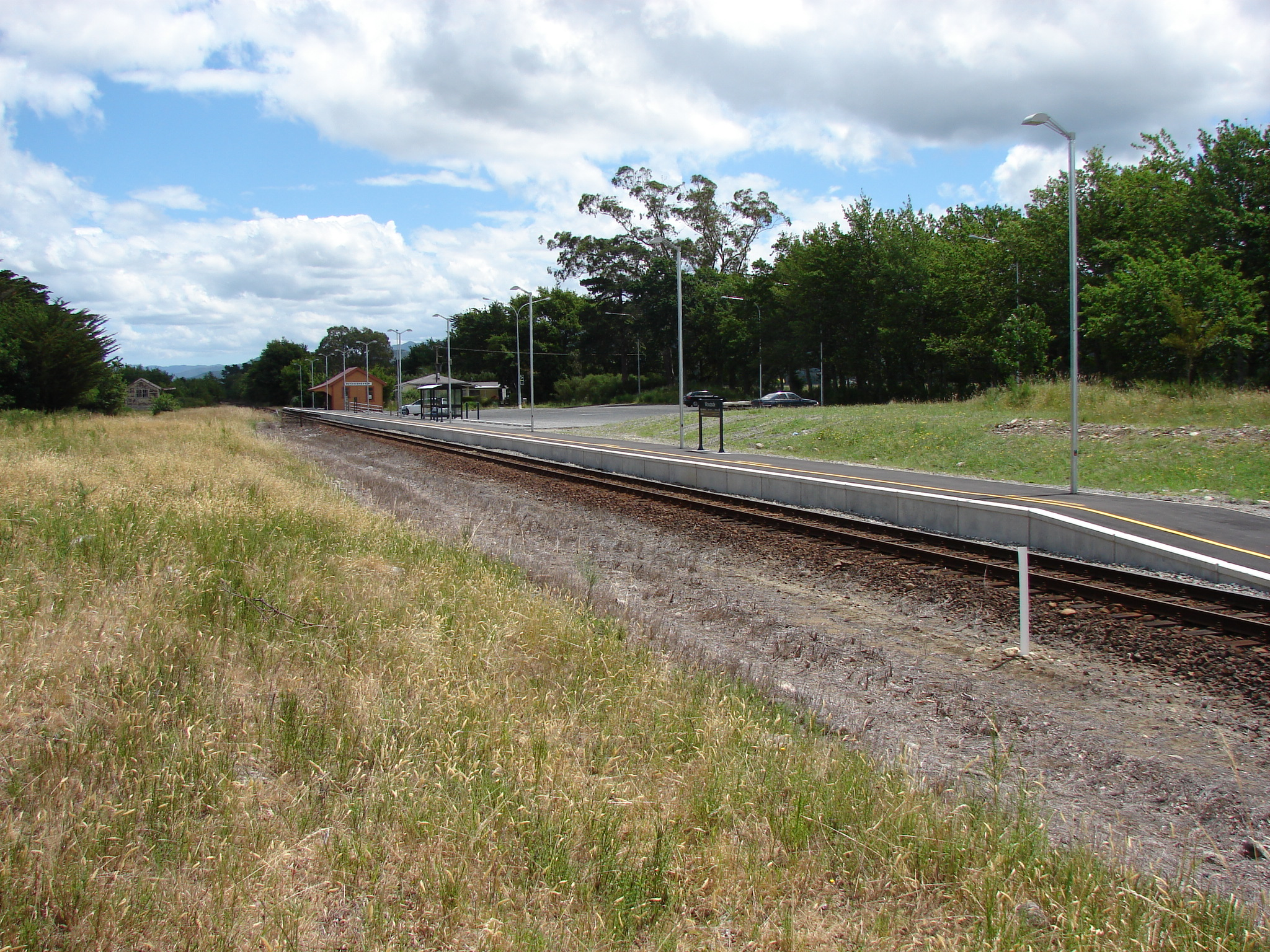
Long station platform

Preceded by Terminus	Stations on the Greytown Branch	Succeeded by Greytown railway station
