= Fernside railway station =

Defunct railway station in New Zealand

Fernside
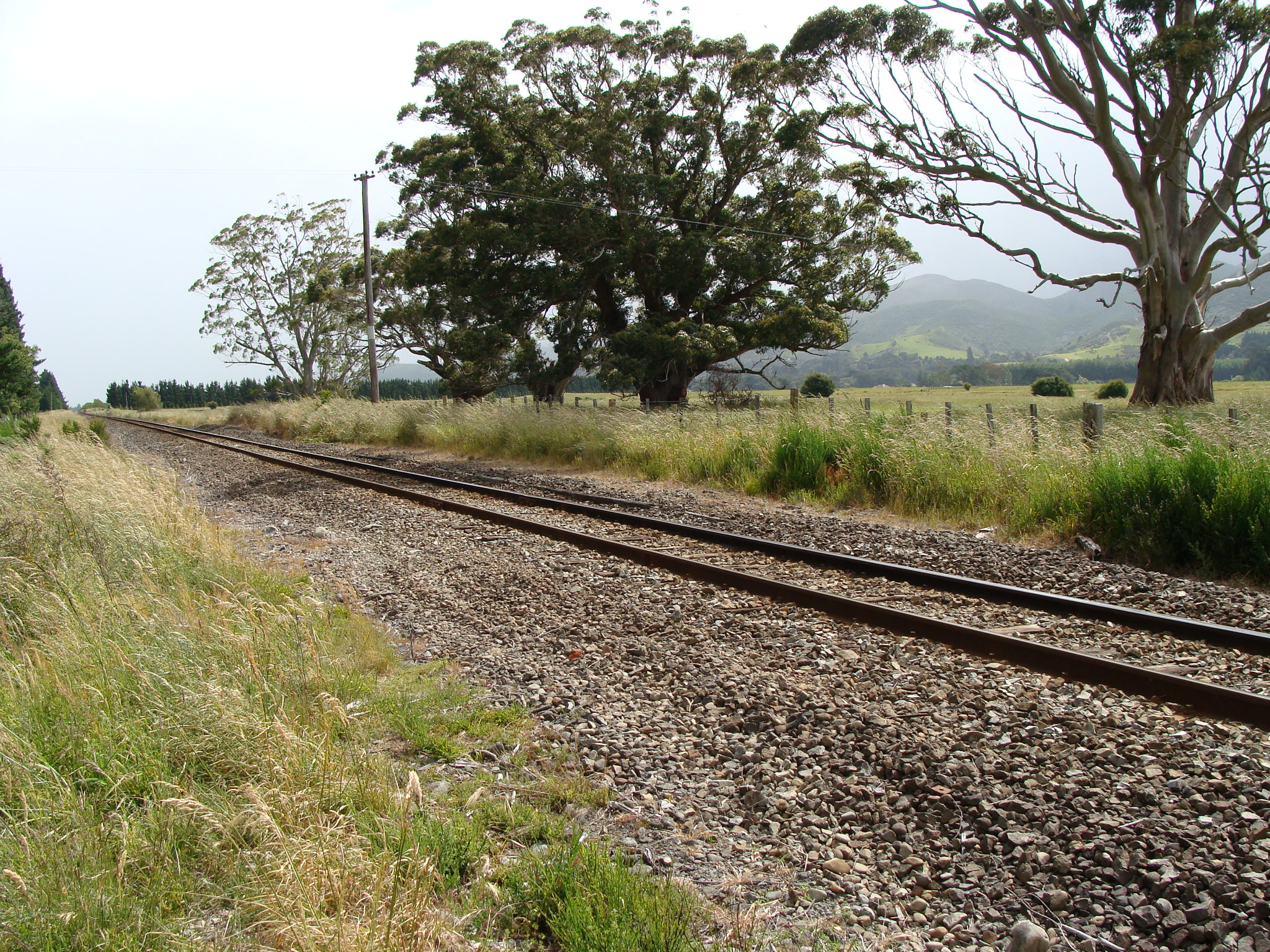
- Fernside station site in 2009.

General information
- Location: Algies Road, Fernside, New Zealand
- Coordinates: 41°5′15.2″S 175°21′39.4″E
- System: New Zealand Government Railways (NZGR) regional rail
- Owner: Railways Department
- Line: Wairarapa Line
- Platforms: Single side
- Tracks: Main (x 1)

History
- Opened: 14 May 1880
- Closed: 26 September 1940 (freight); 30 March 1975 (passengers)
Location
Notes
- Previous Station: Featherston Station; Next Station: Woodside Station

Fernside railway station was a flag station that served the small rural community of Fernside, north-east of Featherston in New Zealand’s North Island. It was located on the Wairarapa Line near the southern bank of the Tauherenikau River. The station opened to traffic in 1880 and closed nearly a century later in 1975.

== History ==
=== Facilities ===
At around the time the station opened it had a passenger shelter and a cottage. At some point a wooden-fronted platform was also constructed as the Masterton-based Inspector of the Permanent Way reported in 1953 that this had rotted and required replacement. An inspection of the passenger shelter in 1963 revealed that it was in such a poor state that it was not economical to repair it and its replacement with a smaller structure was recommended. In response it was noted that the station handled passengers only and patronage of the station was light. It was considered that a new building was not warranted and instructions were issued for no work to be carried out on the building until further notice. In 1965 minor repairs and a repaint were authorised.

Fernside was never considered to be particularly important, but one of the more interesting facets of its history was that the Railways Department constructed a stone crushing plant there near the south bank of the Tauherenikau River in 1908. Source material was extracted from the riverbed and hauled to the plant in small trucks or skips. In 1912 a siding was laid to the plant and, though the plant ceased operation in the early 1920s, the siding was not lifted until about the late 1930s. With this siding gone it seems that there was little further use for the station for the consignment of freight and it was closed for this purpose in 1940.

A backshunt that served as a service siding was retained at Fernside for use by the Way and Works bridge maintenance crew as a place where wagons of material and mobile workers huts could be stored. In practice, however, the crews stationed their huts at Featherston and travelled to the bridge on motor velocipedes. Closure of the siding was suggested in a 1953 report on sidings at unattended stations but the District Engineer required it to remain open in connection with work on the bridge. It was finally closed on 30 July 1962.

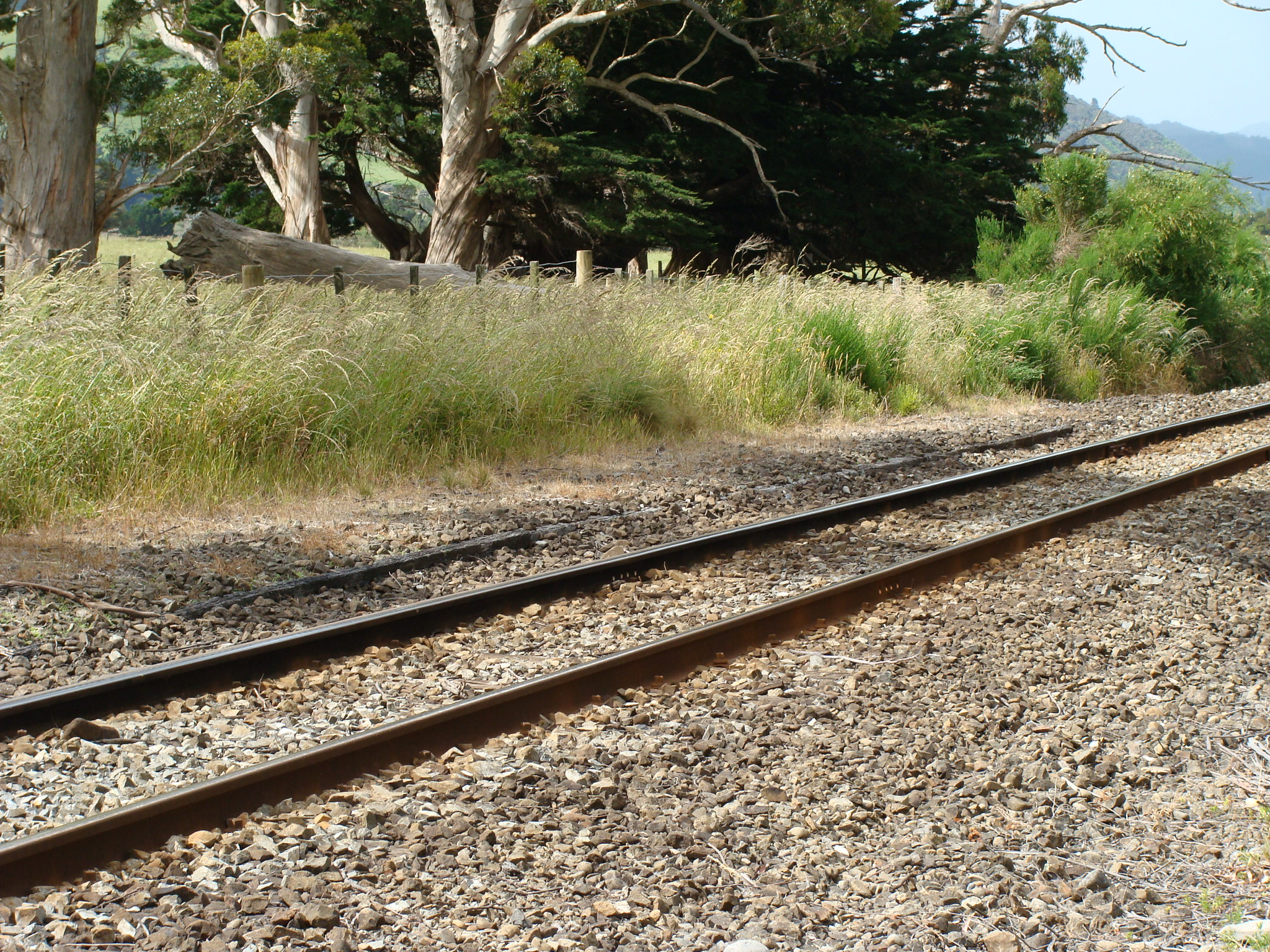
The front edge of the station platform is still clearly visible beside the track.

=== Services ===
The first trains to stop at Fernside were the mixed services that ran from Wellington to Greytown when the Featherston – Greytown section of the line opened in May 1880. These services had earlier terminated at Featherston and were simply extended to run to the new railhead. Later that year the line was opened to Masterton and in 1884 there were two return weekday mixed trains. No regular passenger-only workings were provided save for the occasional holiday excursion trains. As was typically the case for flag stations, trains only stopped to pick up or set down passengers (a flag stop) and wagons if required to do so.

The Wairarapa Line was completed to its northern terminus at Woodville in 1897 and this enabled the Railways Department to introduce the Napier Mail to the Wairarapa Line. This train had earlier run as the Napier Express via the Wellington and Manawatu Railway and the Manawatu Gorge. This arrangement lasted until 1909 when the Napier Mail once again became the Napier Express and reverted to its original route. Thereafter the primary passenger service through the Wairarapa was the Wairarapa Mail which was essentially the Wellington to Woodville portion of the old Napier Mail.

From 1936 when the NZR RM class Wairarapa-type railcars were introduced passengers from Fernside had a much faster service to points both north and south. The Wairarapa Mail passenger trains continued to run but in 1944 were reduced from their Monday – Saturday timetable to a thrice weekly service due to a severe coal shortage. It never recovered from this and was withdrawn completely in 1948. Several years later the Rimutaka Tunnel was opened, bringing an end to the mixed trains that had been plying the Wairarapa Line and the withdrawal of the Wairarapa-type railcars, and ushering in the era of the twin-set railcars. The private motorcar was already having an effect on smaller railway stations and Fernside was no exception with patronage steadily declining. The 1959 railcar timetable lists Fernside as a "stops if required" station for both northbound and southbound services. In 1963 patronage was considered to be "light" and by 1975 it was no longer sufficient to warrant keeping the station open leading to its closure to all traffic on 30 March.

== Today ==
The only sign of the station today is the remains of the platform, the front edge of which can still be seen beside the track. The station site is only accessible from a private driveway off the end of Algies Road.
