= Martinborough Branch =

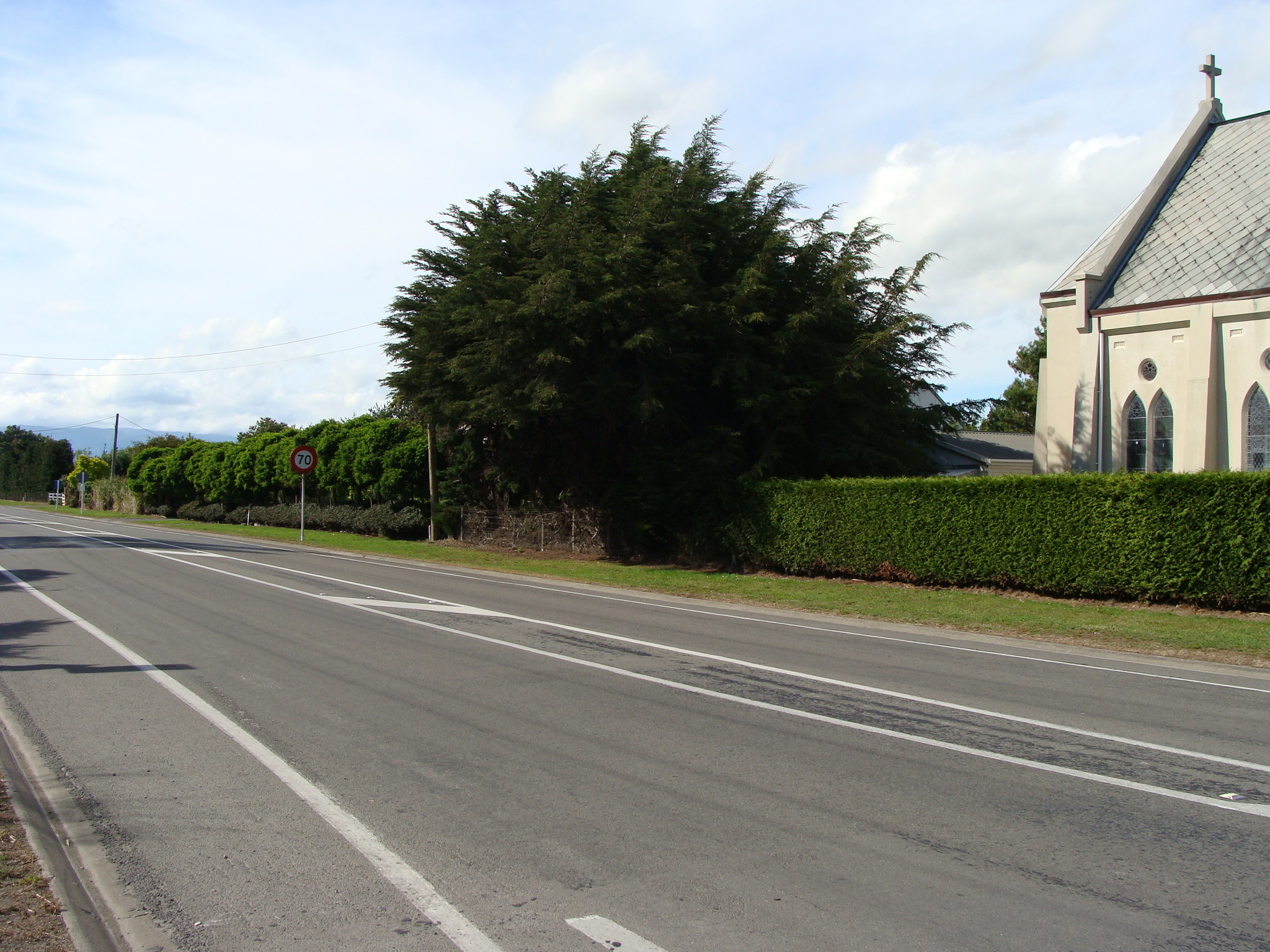
- Site of the proposed Martinborough railway station and terminus of the Martinborough Branch line, behind the church on the corner of Princess Street and Kitchener Street.

Overview
- Status: Abandoned (never completed)
- Owner: Railways Department
- Locale: Wairarapa, New Zealand
- Termini: Featherston; Martinborough
- Stations: None

Service
- Type: Regional rail
- System: New Zealand Government Railways (NZGR)
- Services: Featherston – Martinborough (selected); Woodside – Martinborough via Greytown (proposed)
- Operator(s): None, never completed.

Technical
- Line length: 11.5 mi (18.51 km)
- Number of tracks: Single
- Character: Rural
- Track gauge: 3 ft 6 in (1,067 mm)
Route map

The Martinborough Branch was a proposed railway line that would have connected the south Wairarapa town of Martinborough to the Wairarapa Line in New Zealand’s North Island. It was to have been used by passengers and by goods traffic for a productive agricultural area that was not well served with reliable transport links. Construction started, but was quickly suspended and never resumed.

== History ==
=== Advocacy ===
The first attempt to have a railway constructed to Martinborough was a private effort initiated by a small group of local residents. On learning that the route of the Wairarapa Line would be some distance away, the Waihenga Railway Committee was formed and sought a survey of an appropriate route. The survey was completed, but unfortunately for the members of the committee an attempt to solicit donations to cover their costs met with a less than enthusiastic response. Public indifference doomed the project.

Interest in the idea revived around 1905. The Premier, Joseph Ward, was the guest of honour at a luncheon hosted by the Featherston County Council on 18 December 1907. The Council chairman used the opportunity to impress upon Ward the importance of a railway to Martinborough, and also made clear the inadequacy of the roads in the region which were not expected to cope with future traffic requirements. The Premier responded that the Railways Department was at present busy with other railway construction projects around the country, but as soon as an engineer was available a preliminary survey would be made of the suggested route to gauge the costs involved. He indicated that he did not see any undue difficulty in eventually getting the project approved. Though this meeting was the beginning of the proposal that came the closest to fruition, it ultimately failed to be realised.

World War I led to the establishment of a military training camp north of Featherston. This camp was served by a siding that was extended from a backshunt at Featherston. After the war the siding was used on several occasions for race trains to Tauherenikau Racecourse. In evidence presented to the Fay-Raven Commission of 1924, the Minister of Public Works stated that it was his understanding that the siding was to be the start of a branch line to Martinborough. Despite being abandoned by 1 November 1926 by the Department of Defence and offered to the Railways Department, the siding remained unused following the closure of the camp until being lifted in the 1930s.

In 1925, concerned that Martinborough may not receive what it was due in terms of transport links, the town’s administration prevailed upon the Railways Department for improved services. One of the principal concerns was, given that the town was not to receive a direct rail connection as originally envisaged, that merchants and passengers in the town should not be disadvantaged by having to pay the higher rates of private transport operators compared with the cheaper railway rates they would have been able to pay had the railway come to Martinborough. As an alternative to the abandoned idea of a railway line, they suggested that the department should provide services using an electric tram, trolley bus, or light rail system. The department never seriously considered these proposals when, after examining the relevant information, it concluded that the revenue to be derived from such a service would not come close to covering the capital and operational costs involved, and that the only viable option was to use petrol-powered lorries and buses.

No further proposals for the line were advocated. The final blow to any chance of a branch line to Martinborough came in 1953 when the Greytown Branch closed.

=== Construction ===
Following the meeting with Joseph Ward in 1907, local politician John Hornsby stated that if the government was unable to commit the necessary funds to the project, he was confident the funds could be raised privately. At his insistence, the Railways Department conducted a preliminary survey of both the Featherston – Martinborough and Greytown – Martinborough routes in 1908, the findings of which were made available internally in a report dated 4 August.

The department did not consider the line to be a matter of urgency, and with plenty of other work for its staff did little to advance the Martinborough project. A new survey was called for by the Engineer-in-Chief of the Public Works Department on 10 March 1913 following the passage of the Railways Authorisation Act 1912 through Parliament the previous year. This authorised the construction of the Wellington-Napier (Featherston-Martinborough Branch) From Featherston to Martinborough. Length about eleven miles (17.7 km). The District Engineer, in response to a later missive on the subject, stated that he expected the survey to be completed by the end of February 1914 and the plans by 31 March.

The first signs of construction came later that year when a turning-of-the-first-sod ceremony was held in Martinborough on 20 July, following a commitment given by the Government the previous year to begin construction. The route from Martinborough to Featherston had been chosen by the Railways Department, but as the first section of the line to be constructed from the Martinborough end was common to both the Featherston and Greytown routes, the department continued to receive pleas for it to reconsider the Greytown route as the preferred option.

The Minister of Public Works, William Fraser, represented the Government and officiated at the ceremony. Also present were several members of parliament and around 1,000 locals from both the town and surrounding region. The political party had travelled to Featherston from Wellington by train, and were then conveyed to Martinborough by car, being shown the route of the railway line along the way. On arrival in Martinborough the party were guests at a luncheon, followed by the ceremony. It had been decided to mark the occasion at the site of the future Martinborough railway station, on the north side of Princess Street, near the intersection with Kitchener Street and behind the church. Following the ceremony, the minister presented the ceremonial wheelbarrow, silver spade, and sod to the local school. While there, he also visited the Tauherenikau Racecourse, whose Racing Club members had requested a siding from the branch line to the racecourse.

It was not long before the future of the line was in jeopardy. By the following year, work on the line had effectively been suspended, with no progress made. Fate had intervened on two fronts. First, the effect of World War I on the line and the Railways Department was to deprive it of the manpower required to continue the work. Second, at around this time the department was considering options for a deviation of the Wairarapa Line over and/or through the Rimutaka Ranges. It was felt that a decision on the junction of the Martinborough Branch with the main line should be deferred until such time as it was known what route the Rimutaka Deviation would take. However, the department did affirm in writing to a correspondent that it was still committed to a Featherston – Martinborough route.

After the war, it was clear that little progress had been made since the promising start so many years earlier. By this time a change in Department policy meant that it was no longer in favour of maintaining numerous short feeder lines to its main lines. The cost of completing the line had risen to £150,000, a significant increase from the original quotes. Opposition to the line was growing amongst residents who did not expect that it would be able to earn a sufficient income even if it were built, and local farmers who objected to having their lands bisected by the proposed railway corridor. When, in 1925, the Martinborough Town Board requested that the Railways Department provide improved railway facilities, and met with a representative of the Department to discuss their concerns, they acknowledged that they did not expect any progress to be made on a rail connection for Martinborough, and that private operators were already providing sufficient alternatives to a railway. The Railways Department had begun investigating transport options for Martinborough other than a railway line, and with the strident support of Alexander McLeod the local member for parliament, the Reform Government abandoned the idea of a Martinborough Branch line.

== Proposals ==
Although several variants were suggested, there were two main routes for this proposed line: from Featherston, and as an extension of the Greytown Branch.

=== Featherston – Martinborough route ===
This 11.5-mile (18.5 km) line would have started at Featherston Railway Station. Though this option was the generally preferred route, it was longer and would have involved significant additional construction costs compared with the alternative route, including an expensive crossing of the Tauherenikau River. It would have also involved greater maintenance costs, owing to its longer length and additional permanent structures (bridges, etc.)

The 1913 survey found that the length of the line would be 11 miles 50 chains (18.7 km), with a maximum grade of 1 in 60, and a maximum curvature of 9 chains (180 m) radius. The most expensive works would be bridges crossing the Tauherenikau River (500 feet (150 m) long) and the Ruamāhanga River (700 feet (210 m) long). Also required would be two flood openings of 330 feet (100 m) and 130 feet (40 m) respectively. Sidings were called for at 2 miles 70 chains (4.6 km) (between No. 1 Line Road and the Tauherenikau Racecourse), at 6 miles 10 chains (9.9 km) (west of Ward’s Line Road), and at 7 miles 70 chains (12.7 km) (near Moiki Cutting). Estimated costs were provided in the original 1908 survey as follows:

| | £ | s | d |
|---|---|---|---|
| Formation | 32,950 | 0 | 0 |
| Small Bridges and Culverts | 2,500 | 0 | 0 |
| Tauherenikau Bridge | 7,000 | 0 | 0 |
| Ruamāhanga Bridge | 10,000 | 0 | 0 |
| Ruamāhanga Protective Groins | 1,000 | 0 | 0 |
| Permanent Way and Station Buildings | 35,000 | 0 | 0 |
| Land | 4,550 | 0 | 0 |
| | 93,000 | 0 | 0 |

=== Greytown – Martinborough route ===
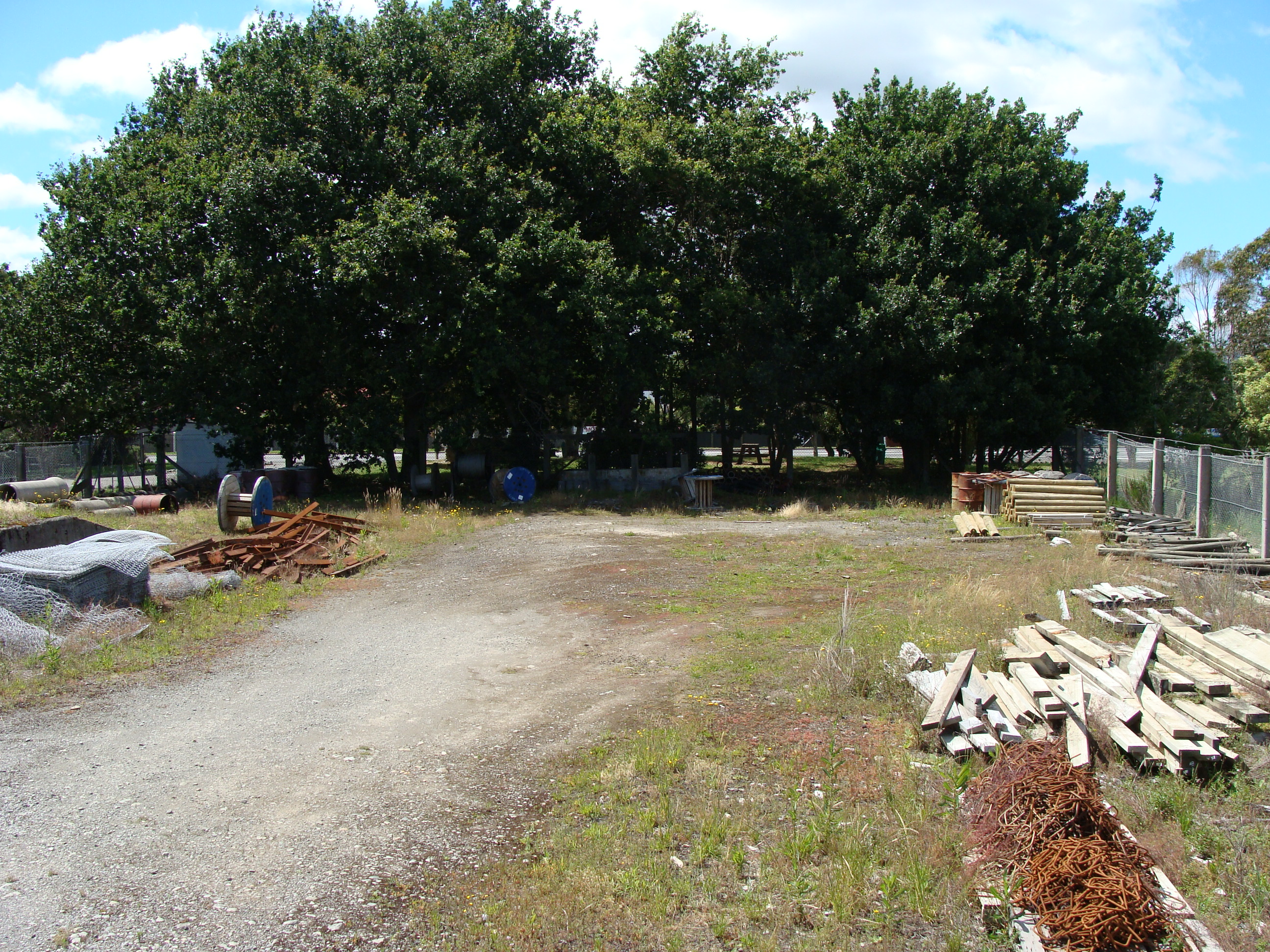
Terminus of the Greytown Branch. Had the Woodside – Martinborough route been selected, the Greytown Branch would have been extended through the reserve behind the trees and across State Highway 2 beyond.

This option would have extended the Greytown Branch across State Highway 2 and then on to Martinborough, a distance of 9 miles (14 km). It had several advantages over the rival proposal, including a shorter route, lower construction costs, and lower operational costs due to being able to utilise the existing rolling stock and crews from the Greytown Branch. The shorter route was estimated to save between £15,000 to £18,000 in capital costs, but it would have still required the relatively expensive crossing of the Ruamāhanga River. The total cost was estimated to be £79,000.

The chief opposition to the Greytown route focussed on the fact that it would mean the railway route to Wellington would be up to 6 miles (9.7 km) longer than via Featherston. However, when investigating options for the Rimutaka Deviation, a route via the Tauherenikau River Valley and directly to Woodside, bypassing Featherston, was considered. Had this deviation been adopted, the rail distance between Martinborough and Wellington would have been 4.5 miles (7.2 km) shorter via Greytown compared with a route via Featherston.

== Today ==
There are no plans for a railway line to Martinborough. As roads in the region improved after World War I, and with the increasing popularity of road transport, the need and desire for a Martinborough Branch railway subsided. Public transport from Martinborough consists of bus routes to Masterton and Featherston, where passengers can connect with Wairarapa Connection trains.

The school to which the wheelbarrow and silver spade were presented following the turning-of-the-first-sod ceremony was destroyed by fire in 1919, a blaze that destroyed the "first sod" and is also believed to have destroyed the ceremonial wheelbarrow. The silver spade was sold at auction in Wellington in June 1964.

== See also ==
- Greytown Branch
- Wairarapa Line
