= Featherston railway station =

Railway station in New Zealand

Featherston
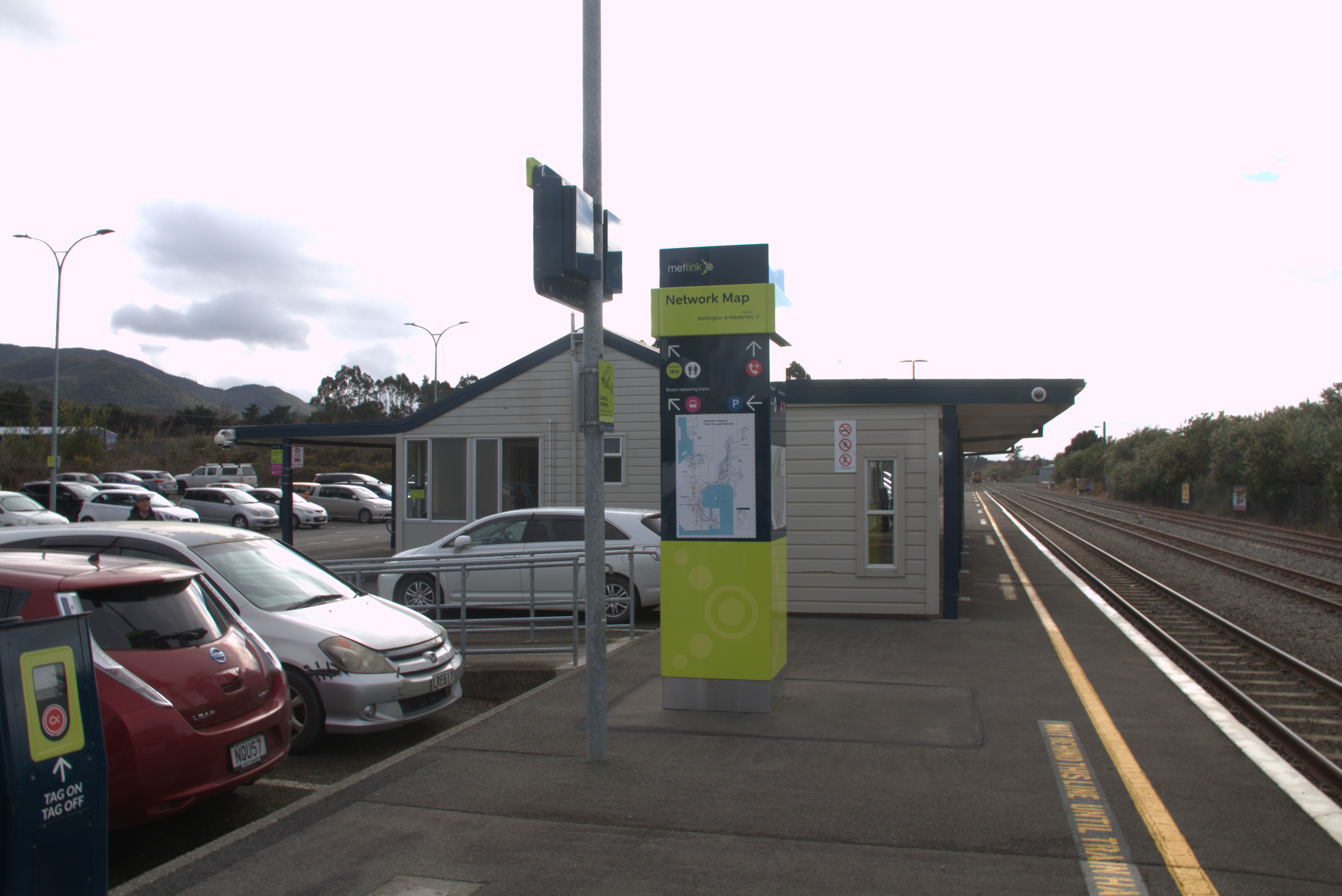
- Featherston Station, 2025

General information
- Location: Harrison Street West, Featherston, New Zealand
- Coordinates: 41°6′47.74″S 175°19′48.85″E
- Elevation: 49 metres (161 ft)
- System: Metlink regional rail
- Owner: Greater Wellington Regional Council
- Line: Wairarapa Line
- Distance: 57.15 kilometres (35.51 mi) from Wellington
- Platforms: Single side
- Tracks: 1 mainline; 1 loop(s); 1 Road Siding
- Train operators: Transdev Wellington
- Bus routes: 1
- Bus operators: Tranzit Coachlines; Wairarapa Coachlines
- Connections: 200 Featherston - Masterton

Construction
- Structure type: At-grade
- Parking: Yes
- Cycle facilities: No

Other information
- Station code: FEAT
- Fare zone: 11

History
- Opened: 16 October 1878; 148 years ago
- Closed: 13 October 1986; 40 years ago (freight)
- Rebuilt: 1982; 44 years ago

Passengers
- 2011: >462 passengers/day

Services
Preceding station	Transdev Wellington	Following station
Woodside towards Masterton	Wairarapa Connection	Maymorn towards Wellington
Location
Notes
- Previous Station (original): Pigeon Bush Station; Previous Station (current): Maymorn Station; Next Station: Fernside Station

Featherston railway station is a single-platform, urban railway station serving the town of Featherston in the Wairarapa district of New Zealand. The station lies on the Wairarapa Line, between Harrison Street West and Harrison Street East. It is thirty-five minutes journey time to Masterton, or fifty five minutes journey time to Wellington by the Wairarapa Connection.

This station also serves a larger area of the South Wairarapa district, in particular the residents of Martinborough, as it is the closest station to several settlements outside of Featherston.

The station building houses a ticket office from which fares for the Wairarapa Connection service are sold. Goods have not been consigned from Featherston since 1986.

== History ==
Formation work on the line reached Featherston on 17 August 1878, with plate-laying completed the following month in September. Though the first train reached Featherston in late September, it was not until 16 October that the railway was opened for public use.

Featherston was initially a station of some importance, being the railhead for two years until the opening of the line through to Masterton. It was opened with a seven-room station building, a 60-by-30-foot (18.3 m × 9.1 m) goods shed, a locomotive shed and watering facilities for the locomotives, but no coal supply until 1888. There were also refreshment rooms, but they, along with the locomotive depot, were removed in 1891. With the closure of the engine shed, all locomotives working the southern Wairarapa district – with the exception of the locomotive working the Greytown Branch – were based at Cross Creek. The original wooden station building was replaced with the present-day structure in 1982.

The goods shed was demolished, but the loading bank and two loops remain. An aggregate supplies company now occupies the area of the yard where the goods shed used to be.

As of 22 July 2008 all remaining sidings were in the process of being removed except the 1st road.

== Future ==
In 2019/20 the GWRC is to "renew" the Featherston railway station.

As part of the New Zealand Upgrade Programme announced by the government on 29 January 2020, a second platform will be installed at Featherston.

== Services ==
The only passenger service with scheduled stops at Featherston station is the Wairarapa Connection. There are five services both ways Monday to Thursday, six services on Fridays and two services each way on Saturday and Sunday.

There is a shuttle bus service operated by Wairarapa Coachlines to transport passengers between Martinborough and the Featherston railway station. These services are timed to meet the daily commuter trains, however there is currently (as at August 2013) no service on Sunday.

Previous Stop	Metlink Bus Services	Next Stop
Mobil Service Station towards Martinborough	200; Featherston - Masterton	Kia Ora Dairy towards Masterton

== Gallery ==
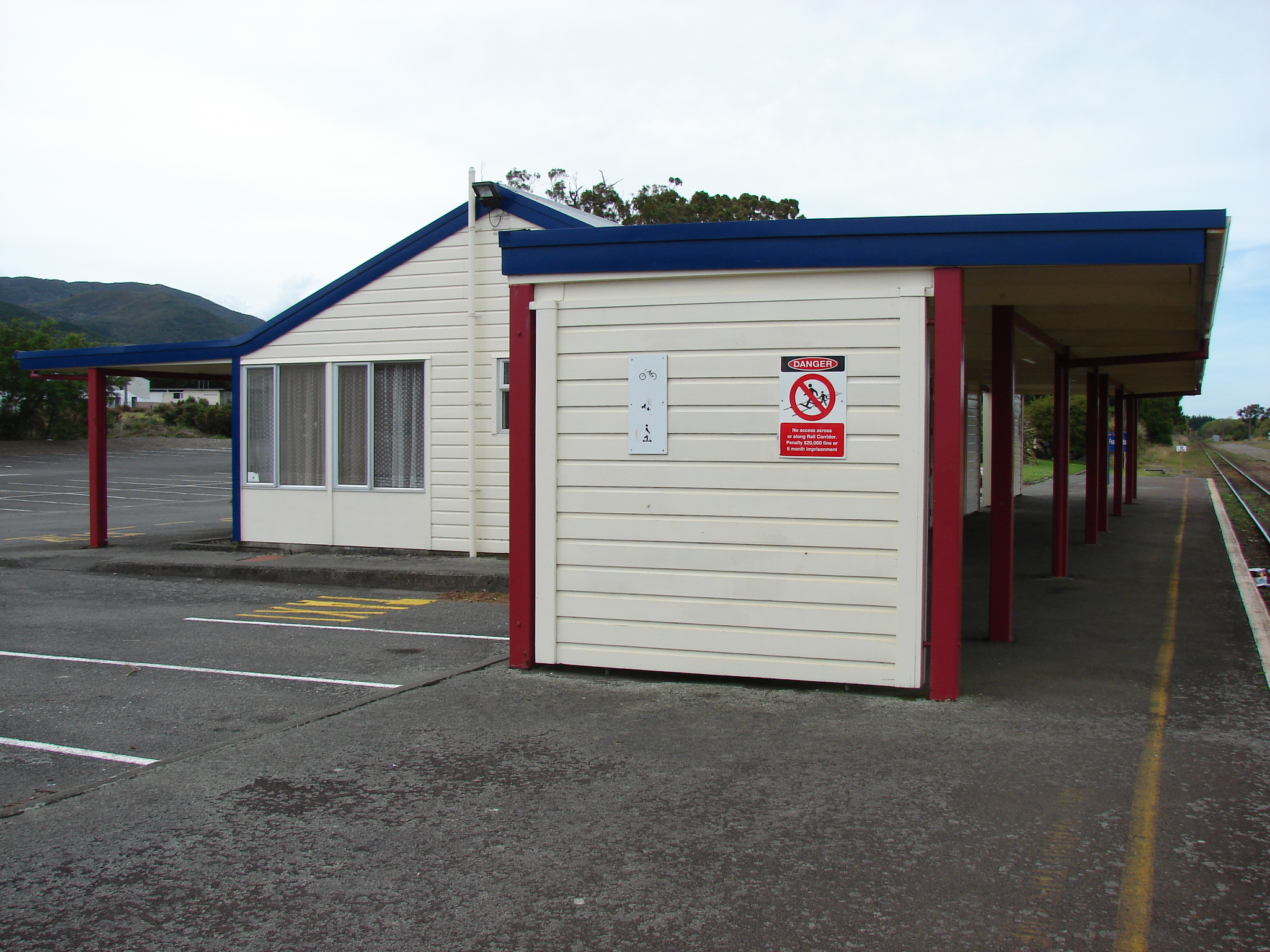

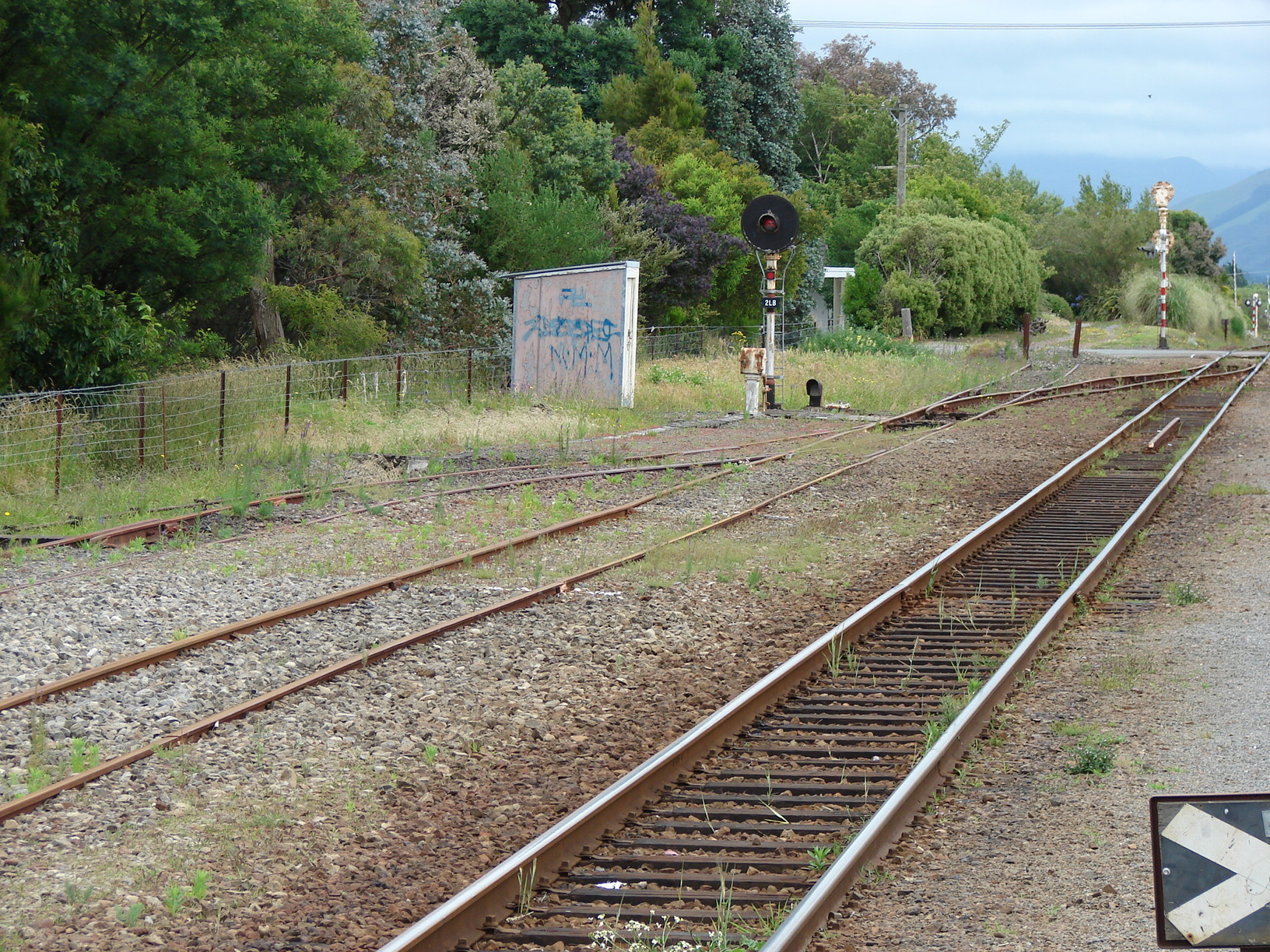
Southern entrance to the yard and Bell St. level crossing.

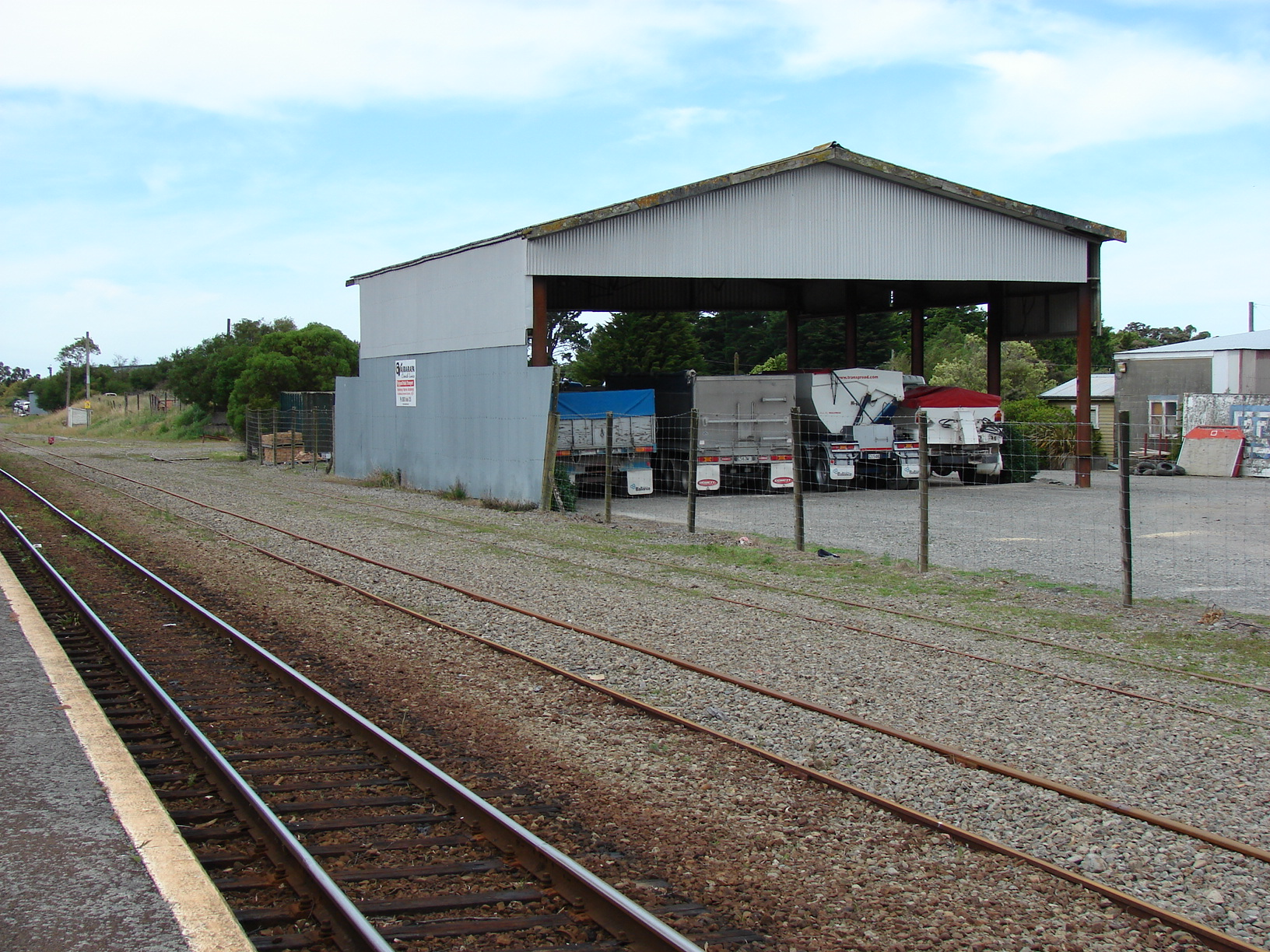
Aggregate supplies company yard occupying the former site of the goods shed.

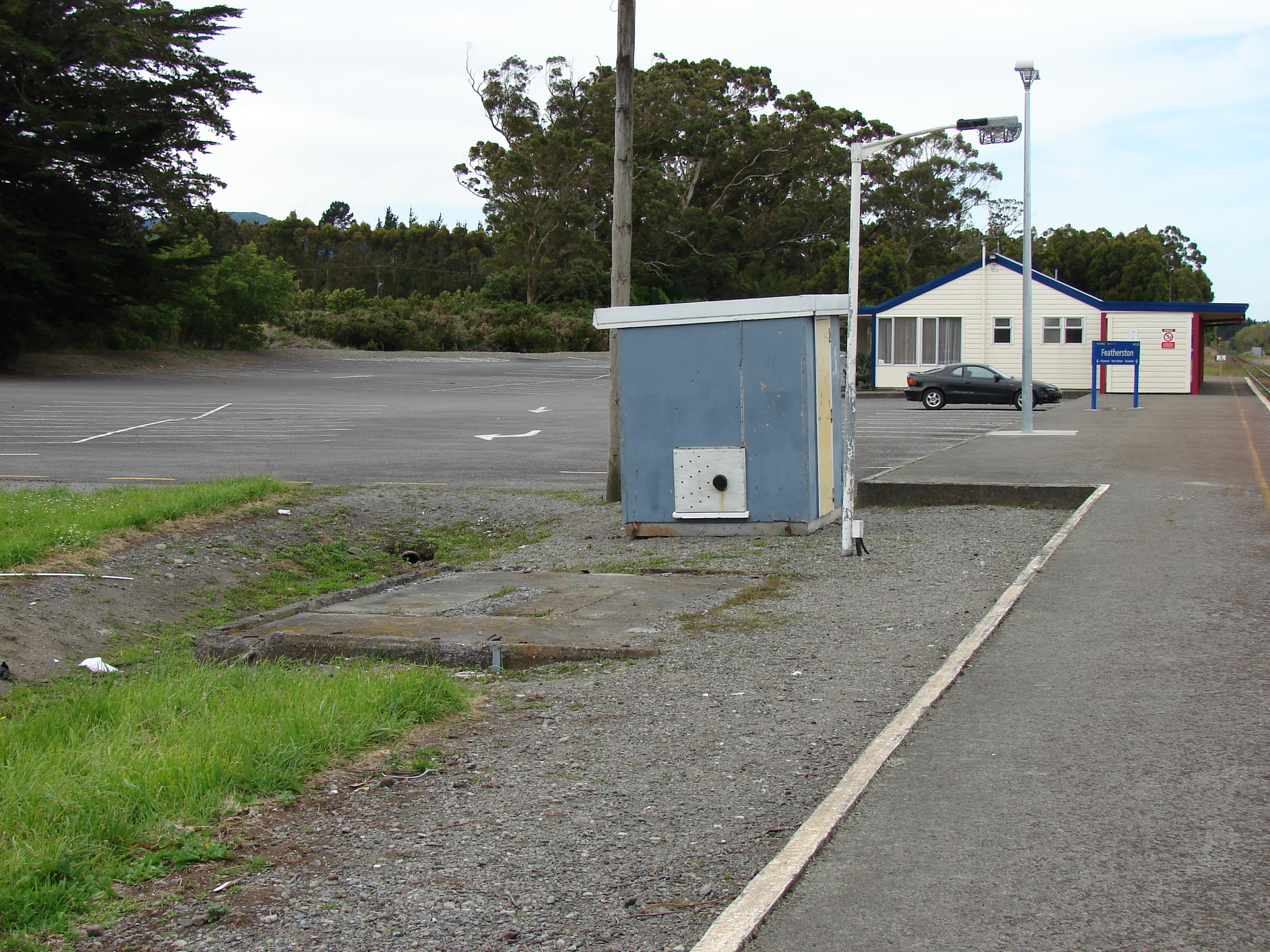
Platform and car park.

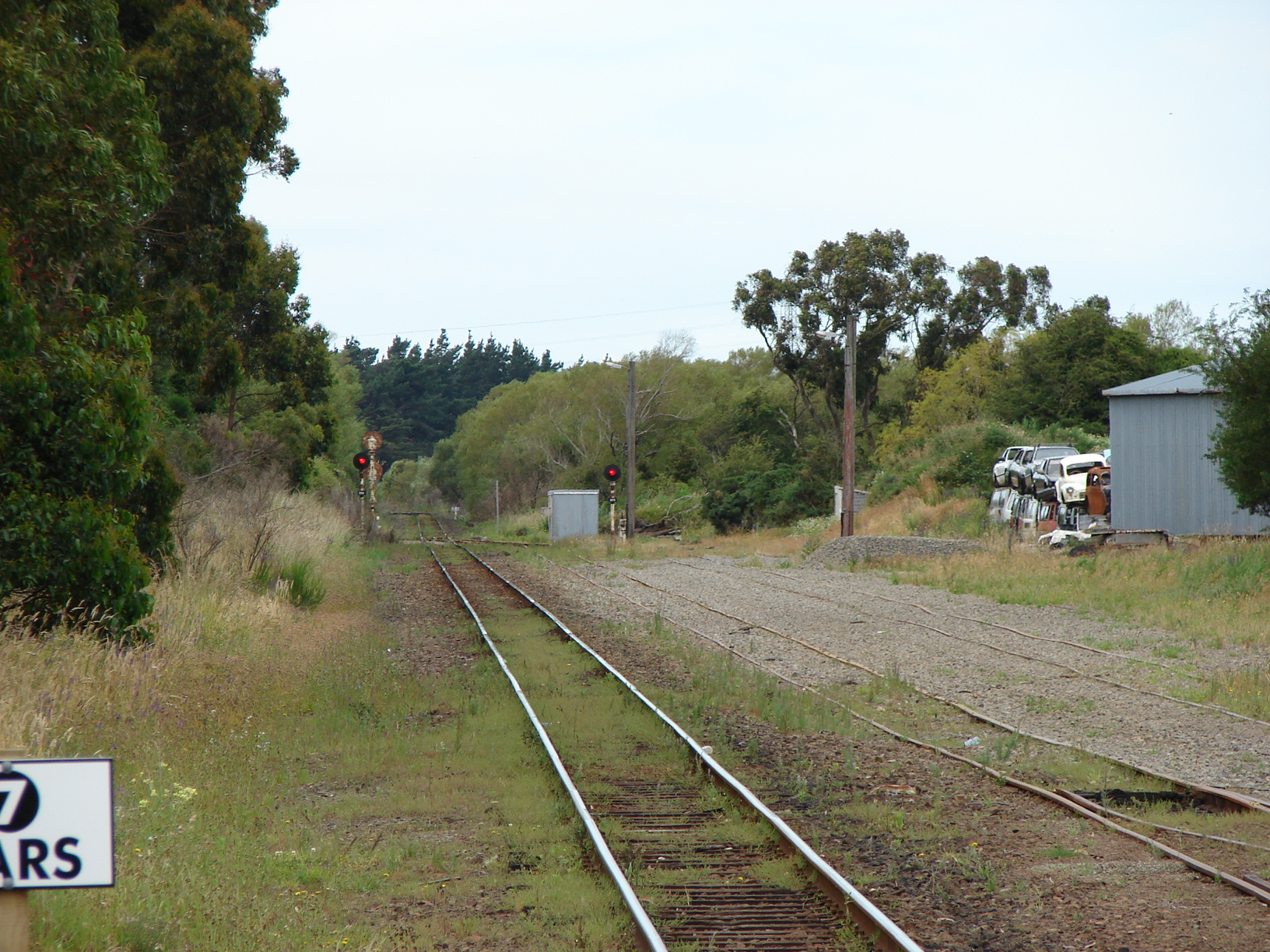
Northern entrance to the yard and signals.

== See also ==
- Martinborough Branch
