= Opaki railway station =

Defunct railway station in New Zealand

Opaki
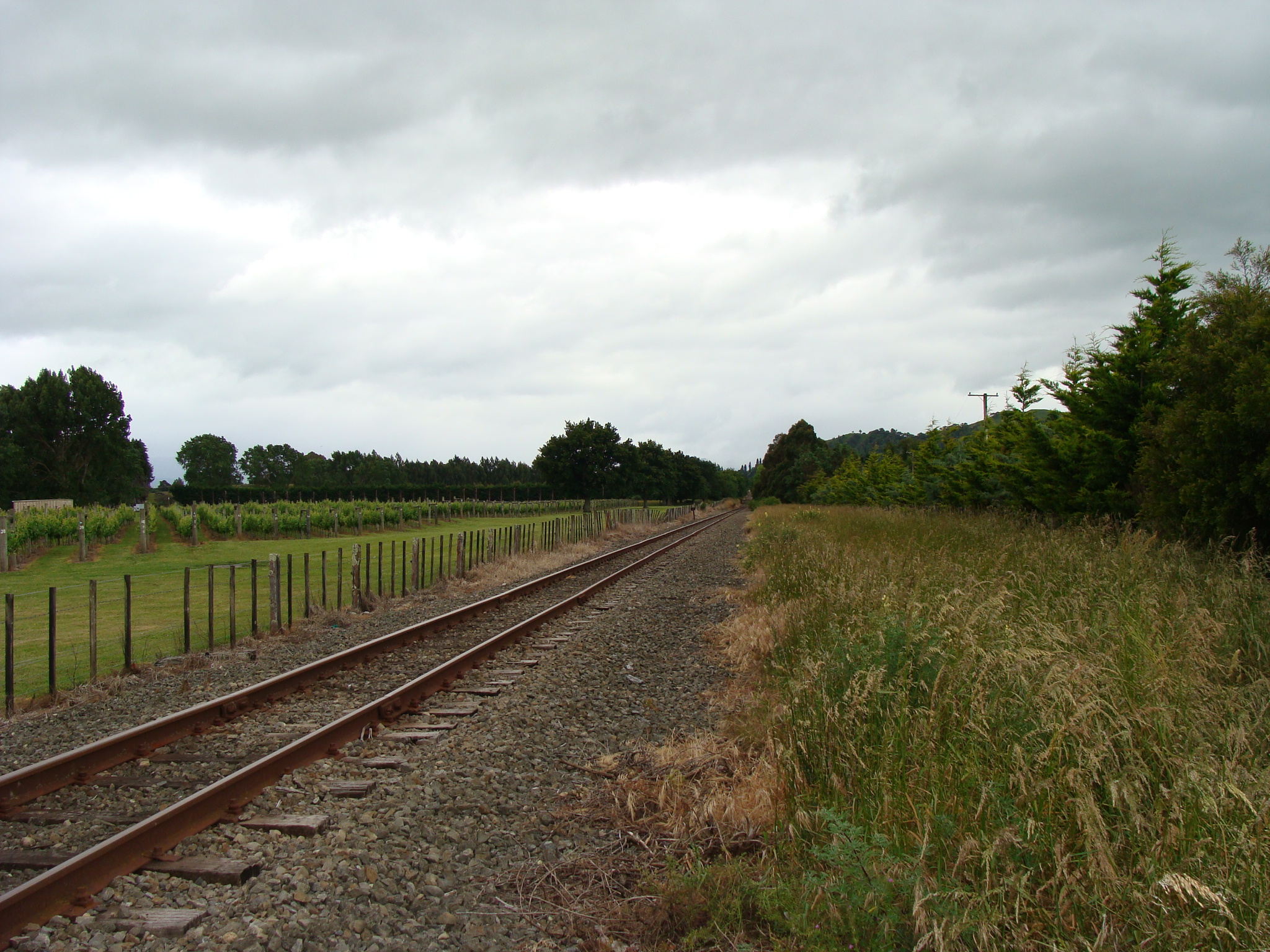
- Site of the former Opaki station.

General information
- Location: Wingate Road, Opaki; New Zealand
- Coordinates: 40°53′17.14″S 175°39′41.64″E
- Elevation: 155 metres (509 ft)
- System: New Zealand Government Railways (NZGR) regional rail
- Owner: Railways Department
- Line: Wairarapa Line
- Distance: 97.25 kilometres (60.43 mi) from Wellington

History
- Opened: 14 June 1886
- Closed: 9 June 1969 (all except goods); 25 September 1972 (goods)
Location
Notes
- Previous Station: Masterton Station; Next Station: Kopuaranga Station

Opaki railway station served the small rural village of Opaki, 6 km (3.7 mi) north of Masterton, in the Wairarapa region of New Zealand’s North Island. It was located on the Wairarapa Line between the stations of Masterton (to the south) and Kopuaranga (to the north) with vehicular access from Wingate Road.

The station opened to all traffic in 1886 along with Kopuaranga and Mauriceville and remained in use for 86 years, seeing a variety of traffic from mixed, goods, and passenger services as well as both steam and diesel motive power. A modal shift from rail to road was largely behind the station’s demise, leading to its closure to all traffic in 1972. Despite closing before the withdrawal of all passenger and local goods services from the northern section of the Wairarapa Line, it is one of several stations (sites) on this section to have been used for railway purposes after being closed to regular traffic.

The New Zealand Ministry for Culture and Heritage gives a translation of "place of fine weather" for Ōpaki.

== History ==
=== Operations ===
==== Early years: 1886–1897 ====
When the station opened in mid-1886, Opaki was served by mixed trains that had already been providing services to stations further south on those sections of the line that were opened as the railway line made its way north. Mauriceville was briefly the railhead (for seven months) until Mangamahoe opened early the next year followed by Eketahuna two years later. Mixed trains continued to provide the only regular passenger services to Opaki until the completion of the line through to Woodville in 1897.

==== Heyday: 1897–1908 ====
At the time the Wairarapa Line was completed, the Wellington–Manawatu Line was owned and operated by the privately held Wellington and Manawatu Railway Company, meaning all government trains from Wellington to destinations north ran via the Wairarapa, ascribing a status of some importance to stations like Opaki. The popular Napier Mail trains were diverted from their original Napier – Palmerston North route to run via the Wairarapa to Wellington, and became the main passenger service stopping at Opaki, supplementing the mixed trains that continued to run on this section.

In conjunction with the opening of the tablet office in October 1907, two tablet porters were assigned to Opaki station.

==== Halcyon years: 1908–1960s ====
The government in 1908 purchased the Wellington and Manawatu Railway Company's line from Wellington to Longburn, which had an effect on services provided in the Wairarapa, particularly the section of the line north of Masterton. Because of the lengthy and costly delays associated with the operation of the Rimutaka Incline, much freight traffic from the northern Wairarapa region was diverted north through Woodville and Palmerston North so it could be taken down the Main Trunk Line to Wellington. Mixed trains, however, continued to operate through Opaki.

A timetable change in 1909 reduced the hours of attendance at the station and consequently one of the porters was withdrawn and the Mauriceville porter provided relief coverage at Opaki one day a week. A further timetable change in 1911 resulted in the Opaki porter being rostered on for an average 11.75 hours per ordinary day over 16 hours, with extra time required when special or work trains were running. Complaints were made about the long hours required at Opaki and after a timetable revision it was recommended in November 1919 that Opaki be made a switch-out tablet station. This would reduce the hours of attendance at Opaki to 10 hours per day and eliminate the need to appoint a second porter. The work was approved in August 1920.

By 1927 it had become apparent that there was insufficient traffic at Opaki to justify the retention of the tablet porter there. Hours of attendance by this time had been reduced to 7 hours on Tuesdays, Thursdays, and Saturdays, and 6 hours on Mondays, Wednesdays, and Fridays. In the six months to July 1927 trains had crossed at Opaki on 12 occasions and only because one of the trains was running late; there were no scheduled crossings at Opaki. In the event of Opaki ceasing to be a permanent tablet station, arrangements could be made to avoid crossing trains there and to supply a porter from Masterton for special occasions. The main railway function of the porter was to operate the tablet equipment in the infrequent event of trains crossing at the station but the Post & Telegraph Department also paid the Railways Department for the porter to carry out postal business. After the Railways Department confirmed the withdrawal of the porter from Opaki in August 1927, the Post & Telegraph Department elected to permanently close the Post and Telephone office at the station rather than supply their own clerk to conduct their business there. To give locals time to make alternative arrangements, the Railways Department agreed to retain their porter at the station until 29 September 1927 at which time the postal office closed. Tablet equipment was retained at the station to be used as required.

Shortly after the nationalisation of the WMR line, the Napier Express was diverted in 1909 from the Wairarapa Line to run through the Manawatū Gorge and down the former WMR line to Wellington. Thereafter, the main passenger service to stop at Opaki was its replacement, the Wairarapa Mail. A new passenger-only service was provided from 1936 with the introduction of the Wairarapa-class railcars, which supplemented and later replaced the Wairarapa Mail in 1948. The Wairarapa railcars were in turn replaced after the opening of the Rimutaka Tunnel in 1955 by the twinset railcars. The railcar timetable for 1959 shows only one required stop at Opaki Monday to Saturday on a morning Woodville – Wellington service, with request stops only for all other services. During the period in which railcar services were provided through Opaki, locomotive-hauled carriage trains were occasionally provided when demand exceeded the capacity of the railcars.

==== Demise ====
A request for the replacement of passenger shelters at Mangamahoe and Newman was made of the Department in June 1966, which, while rejected, led to a wider review of the patronage of other Wairarapa stations, including Opaki. A count of passengers using each of the stations under review was made for a month each in 1967 and 1968 after which a report was produced for the Transportation Superintendent that included the following figures.

Station	1967 November (4 weeks)			1968 March (4 weeks)			GRAND TOTAL		
Station	Boarding	Disembarking	Total	Boarding	Disembarking	Total	Boarding	Disembarking	Total
Opaki	1	11	12	Nil	7	7	1	18	19

The report recommended that passenger services be withdrawn from Opaki. Following up on the report, locals were consulted on the proposal including Federated Farmers, Masterton County Council, Eketahuna County Council, and Pahiatua County Council, with no objections raised. Further, it was noted that buses served Opaki twice daily in each direction, there were no regular passengers using the station, and that parcels traffic was almost non-existent. The department concurred with the recommendation and closed the station to all except goods in wagon lots from Monday 9 June 1969.

Despite being closed to regular passenger traffic, provision was made for continued use of the station for special trains on race days. These trains, run from Wellington to a temporary stopping place south of Opaki station, brought in patrons for race meetings of the Masterton Racing Club at Opaki Racecourse held in May, October, and December of each year. After disembarking the passengers, the trains were run empty to Opaki where the loop was used to run the locomotive around the train in preparation for the return journey.

Use of the station continued to decline and in May 1972 it was recommended that it be closed completely. A traffic return for the 12 months ended 31 March 1972 showed that 36 head of cattle and 137 head of sheep were consigned out from the station and 10 ton of fertiliser, 24 ton of grain, and 15 ton of stock food were received, much of which was destined for the Colville Poultry Farm which had recently closed. Federated Farmers was consulted on the proposal and agreed that there was insufficient use of the station to justify its retention. The proposal was approved on 7 September 1972 and, in line with recommendations, instructions were issued for the sale and removal of the stockyards and the recovery of railway equipment from the site after the station closed on the 25th of that month. The General Manager was advised on 15 February 1973 that the stockyards had been removed.

=== Facilities ===
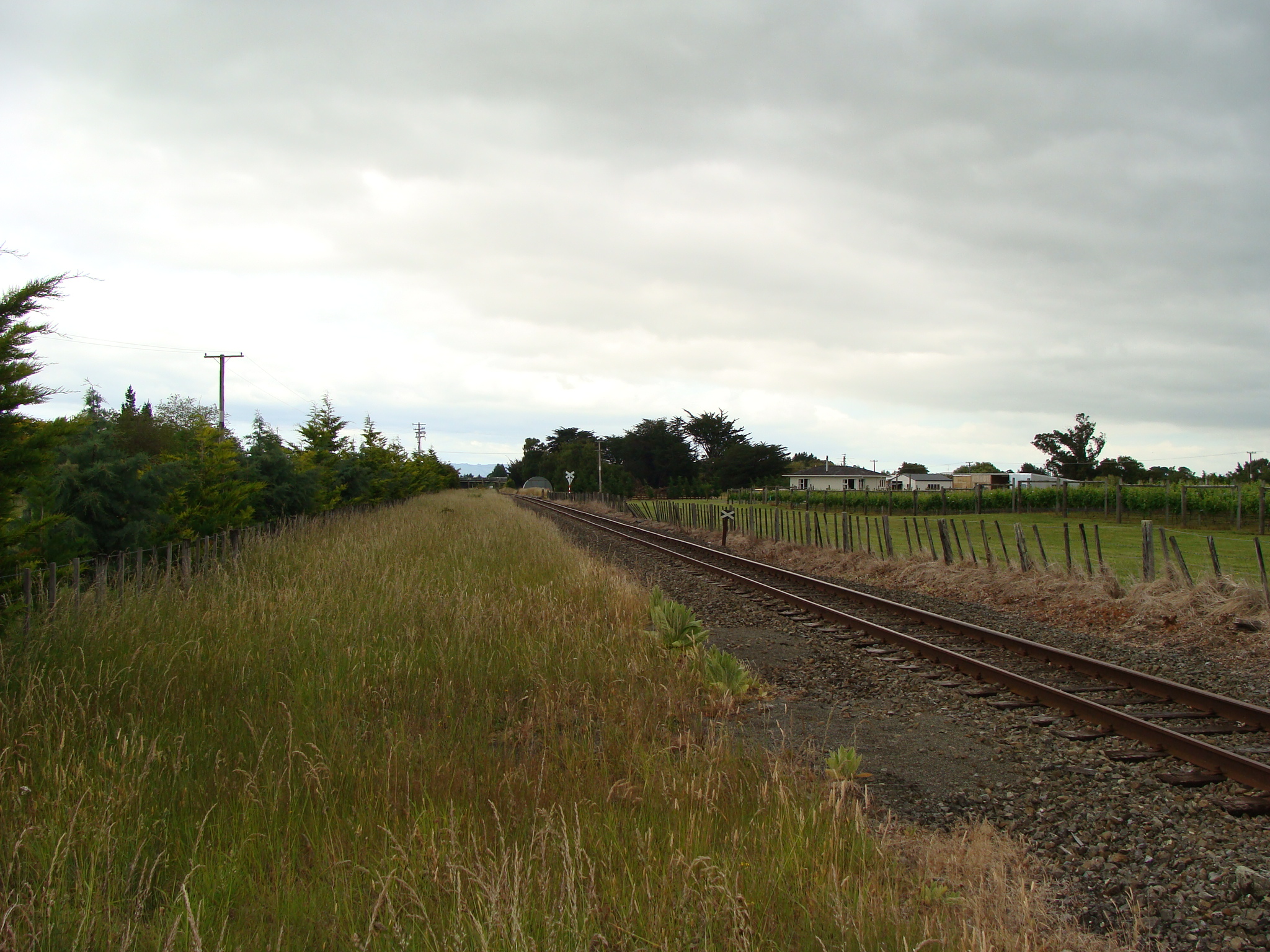
Looking south from the station site towards Wingate Road and SH2.

==== Station buildings & yard ====
After being petitioned by local farmers in early 1894 for the provision of facilities for handling livestock at Opaki, the department agreed to install standard sheep and cattle pens if the interested parties contributed £25 towards the cost. The facilities for loading cattle were considered inadequate but as of October 1896 the department had still not received any contribution to the cost of upgrading the facilities. The station's existing sheep pens were strengthened for the use of cattle at the request of a local farmer after he agreed to contribute to the cost of the work in August 1898.

Instructions were issued in July 1907 to have the station building extended to provide office space for the installation and use of tablet equipment. In February 1925, arrangements were made for the Post Office to open a branch in the station building.

Work on relaying the main line with 70 lb (32 kg) rails in 1908 afforded an opportunity to install a new siding at Opaki. The siding, to be used as a crossing loop, was approved on 9 July 1908, bringing the number of sidings at Opaki to two. The District Engineer confirmed on 2 October 1908 that the loop, with standing room for 47 wagons, had been completed and was ready for use.

An urgent request was made on 21 November 1962 for the construction of a high-level loading bank that was required for the loading of a large consignment of specially graded river metal. It was built on top of part of the existing low-level loading bank (constructed in 1898) and completed on 29 November 1962.

When the station closed to passenger traffic in 1969 it was noted that the station had an old shed type of building with paintwork in good repair and that the structure was in sound condition. Also present was the platform, loading banks (high and low level), cattle yards and sheep pens.

The only facilities remaining when the station closed to all traffic in 1972 was the signalling and interlocking equipment, the siding, and the stockyards. The signalling and interlocking was still in good condition on account of it having only been installed in 1969 and it was therefore recommended that it be retrieved for use elsewhere. The siding was considered to be in "fair order" only and would have required maintenance to retain it in use, while the stockyards were in poor condition and it was recommended that they be sold by tender for removal.

==== Ballast pits ====
Shortly after the station opened, the department began in 1887 to extract gravel from the riverbed of the nearby Ruamāhanga River at a site just south of the terminus of Wingate Road. When this was worked out, a new site was taken just north of the terminus of Wingate Road in 1908, which, by 1915, was no longer in use.

=== Private use ===
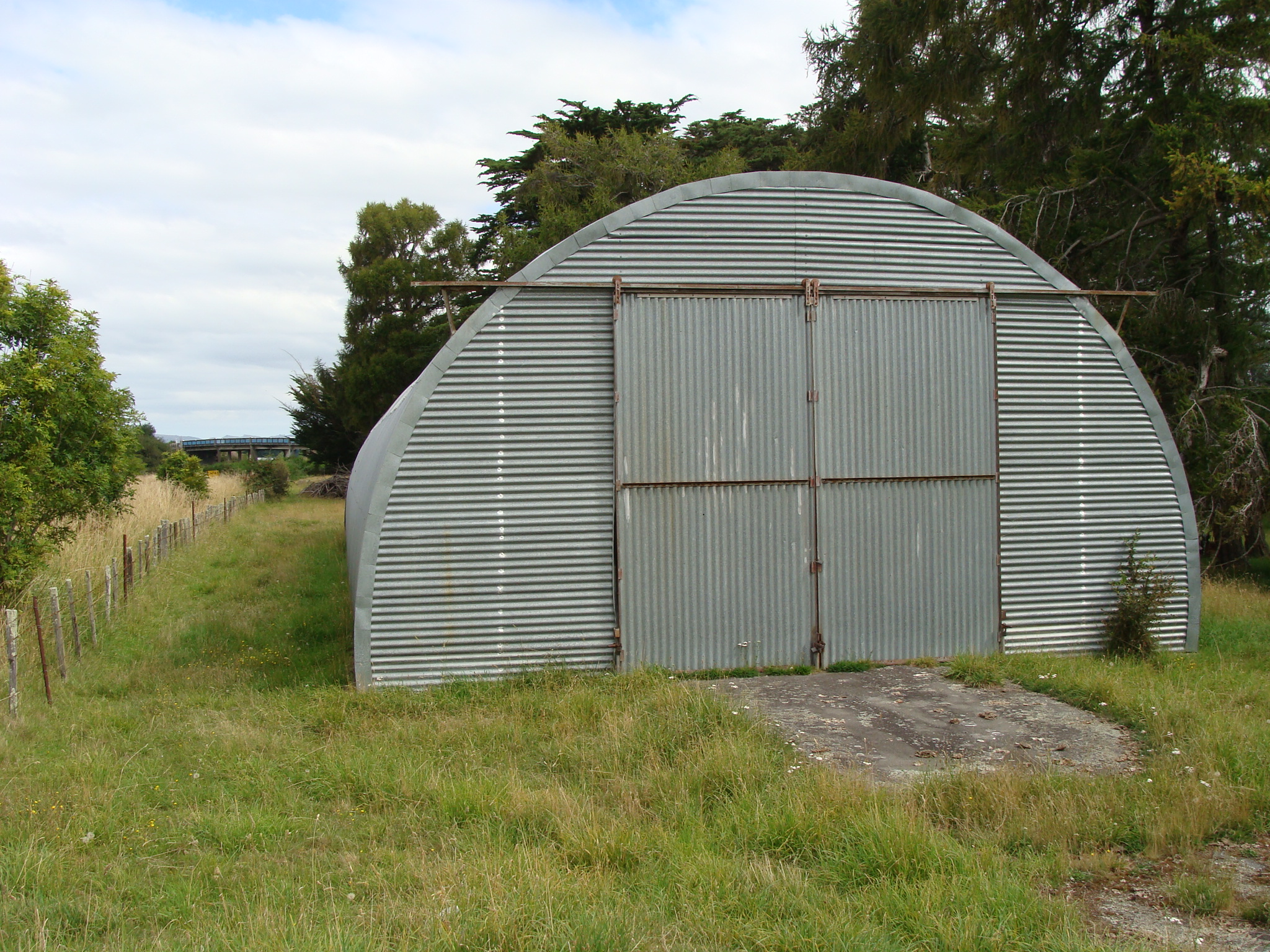
The railcar storage shed erected by John Murphy, with the SH2 overbridge in the background.

Local railway enthusiast and preservationist John Murphy wrote to the Railways Department in October 1975 requesting a lease on a small plot of railway land in the Wairarapa on which he intended to erect a storage shed to house a Standard class railcar he has acquired in 1973. The railcar was at the time with the Glenbrook Vintage Railway but a policy change resulted in Murphy being requested to remove his railcar. He decided to relocate it to the Wairarapa and suggested three sites in his lease application that would be suitable: the former ballast pit at Featherston station, at Woodside station (south end of the yard, formerly in use for the stockyards), and at the former Opaki station site. The function of the site was to be for the storage of RM 31 and a D-class steam locomotive owned by another railway enthusiast as well as assorted parts and equipment, and for restoration and maintenance work on the same. It was not intended to allow for public access or commercial operations.

The Department's Lease Committee met in November and decided that both the Featherston and Woodside sites were not suitable. They were prepared to recommend the lease of a site at Opaki, subject to some riders on the conditions in the lease application, which was approved later that month. After being advised of the cost of inspecting and transporting the railcar to the Wairarapa, Murphy additionally requested the temporary use of facilities at Masterton for the storage of RM 31 while the site at Opaki was being prepared, which was also granted for a period of six months. Following objections raised by two neighbours of the old Opaki station site, Murphy agreed to instead lease an alternative site in an area occasionally used for grazing south of the former station yard between Wingate Road and the SH2 overbridge which was subsequently approved in 1976 for a period of 20 years.

Years later, Murphy sought assistance to help him with the work required on RM 31 and in January 1993 met with Don Selby of the Pahiatua Railcar Society to discuss options. It was proposed that the Society lease the railcar so work could continue on it, to which the Society agreed for a term of 30 years. RM 31 initially remained at the Opaki site, but was later transferred to temporary storage at Masterton while arrangements were made for the construction of appropriate facilities at the Society's base at the Pahiatua railway station. Once this was completed the railcar was moved to its new home in June 2001.

== Today ==
There are no remnants of the station at the site to indicate that there was ever a station there. The railcar storage shed constructed for RM 31 remains in situ.

For a period of seven years from 27 November 1988, the northern section of the Wairarapa Line was effectively mothballed, with no trains scheduled to pass through Opaki. Congestion on the Wellington – Palmerston North section of the NIMT led to the rescheduling of the Wellington – Napier freight services to run via the Wairarapa from 14 August 1995. Following the daylighting of tunnels Nos. 3, 4, 5 on the Palmerston North - Gisborne Line in Q3 2008, and thus the removal of the impediment to running hi-cube containers through the Manawatū Gorge, the Wellington – Napier freight services were redirected to their original route from Q4 2008.

== Notes ==
- Opaki - Station building, Wellington: Archives New Zealand, 1915–1965, R-W 3 28 / 9186
- Cattle and sheep yards - Opaki, Wellington: Archives New Zealand, 1894–1973, R 4 W2493 5 / 1898/3458
- Staff - Opaki, Wellington: Archives New Zealand, 1907–1927, R 3 W2278 133 / 1907/3540 1
- Opaki - Yard and sidings, Wellington: Archives New Zealand, 1908–1962, R-W 3 19 / 5617
- Opaki - Stockyards, Wellington: Archives New Zealand, 1894–1936, R-W 3 2 / 135
