= Kopuaranga railway station =

Defunct railway station in New Zealand

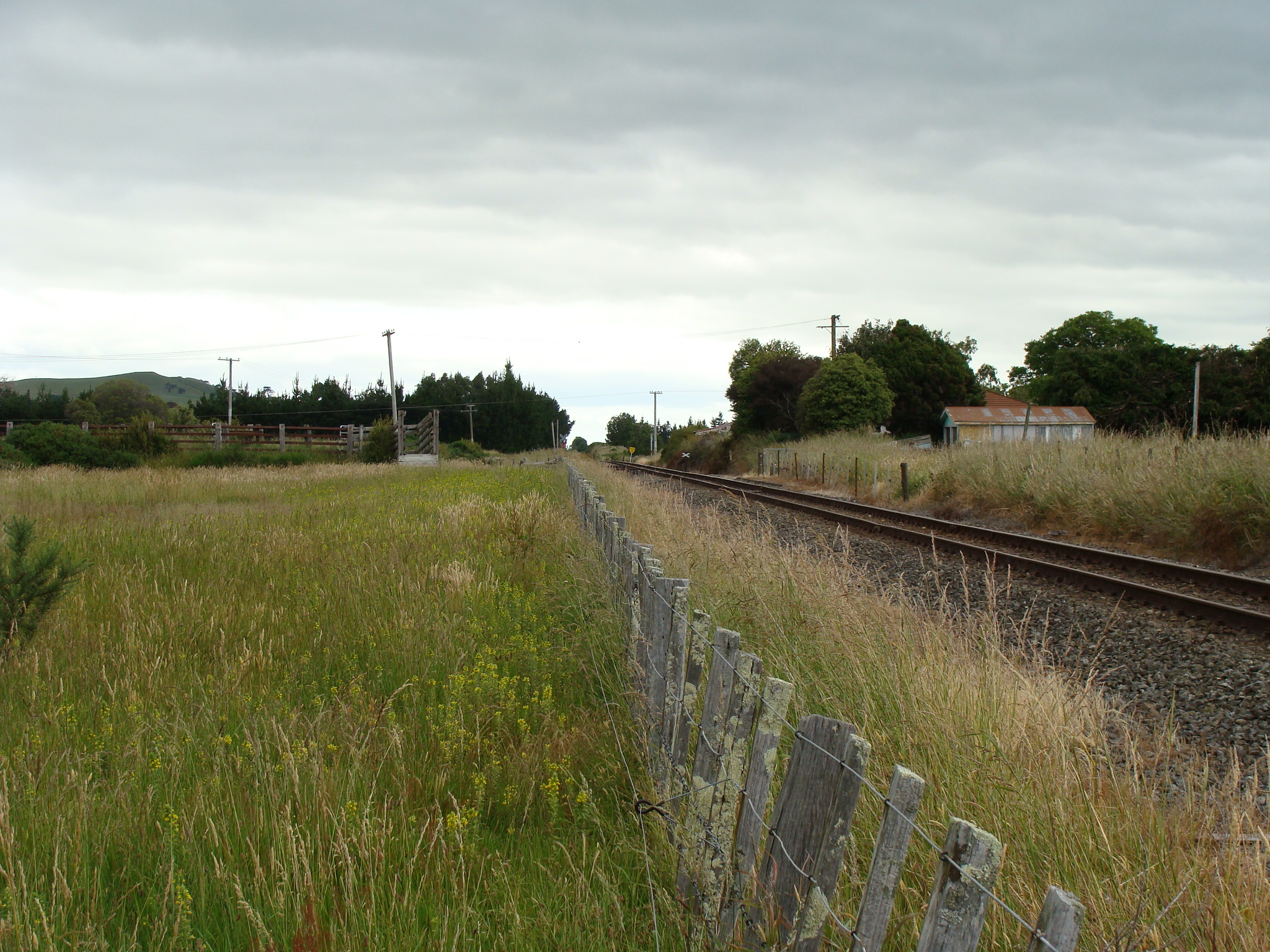
- Kopuaranga railway station, looking south towards Donovans Road. December 2009.

General information
- Location: Donovans Road, Kōpuaranga; New Zealand
- Coordinates: 40°49′57.82″S 175°39′51.18″E
- Elevation: 185 metres (607 ft)
- System: New Zealand Government Railways (NZGR) regional rail
- Owner: Railways Department
- Operator: Railways Department
- Line: Wairarapa Line
- Distance: 103.53 kilometres (64.33 mi) from Wellington
- Platforms: single side
- Tracks: one (main line)

Construction
- Parking: no

History
- Opened: 14 June 1886
- Closed: 1 August 1966 (freight, wagon lots); 24 September 1978 (freight, parcels & small lots); 1 August 1983 (passengers)
Location
Notes
- Previous Station: Opaki Station; Next Station: Mauriceville Station

Kopuaranga railway station was a flag station that served the small rural settlement of Kōpuaranga, 12½ km north of Masterton, in the Wairarapa region of New Zealand’s North Island. It was located on the Wairarapa Line between the stations of Opaki (to the south) and Mauriceville (to the north). From its opening in 1886 it handled both passenger and freight traffic for 97 years until closure in 1983.

== History ==
=== Operations ===
==== Early years: 1886–1897 ====
When the station opened in mid-1886, Kōpuaranga was served by mixed trains that had already been providing services to stations further south on those sections of the line that were opened as the railway line made its way north. Mauriceville was briefly the railhead (for seven months) until Mangamahoe opened early the next year followed by Eketahuna two years later. Mixed trains continued to provide the only regular passenger services to Kōpuaranga until the completion of the line through to Woodville in 1897.

==== Heyday: 1897–1908 ====
At the time the Wairarapa Line was completed, the Wellington–Manawatu Line was owned and operated by the privately held Wellington and Manawatu Railway Company, meaning all government trains from Wellington to destinations north ran via the Wairarapa. The popular Napier Mail trains were diverted from their original Napier – Palmerston North route to run via the Wairarapa to Wellington, and became the main passenger service stopping at Kōpuaranga, supplementing the mixed trains that continued to run on this section.

==== Halcyon years: 1908–1960s ====
The government in 1908 purchased the Wellington and Manawatu Railway Company’s line from Wellington to Longburn, which had an effect on services provided in the Wairarapa, particularly the section of the line north of Masterton. Because of the lengthy and costly delays associated with the operation of the Rimutaka Incline, much freight traffic from the northern Wairarapa region was diverted north through Woodville and Palmerston North so it could be taken down the Main Trunk Line to Wellington. Mixed trains, however, continued to operate through Kōpuaranga.

Shortly after the nationalisation of the WMR line, the Napier Express was diverted in 1909 from the Wairarapa Line to run through the Manawatū Gorge and down the former WMR line to Wellington. Thereafter, the main passenger service to stop at Kōpuaranga was its replacement, the Wairarapa Mail. A new passenger-only service was provided from 1936 with the introduction of the Wairarapa-class railcars, which supplemented and later replaced the Wairarapa Mail in 1948. The Wairarapa railcars were in turn replaced after the opening of the Rimutaka Tunnel in 1955 by the twinset railcars. The railcar timetable for 1959 shows two request stops north– and south–bound Monday to Saturday, an additional stop on Fridays, and two on Sundays. During the period in which railcar services were provided through Kōpuaranga, locomotive-hauled carriage trains were occasionally provided when demand exceeded the capacity of the railcars.

It was reported in 1953 that freight traffic handled at the station was as follows:

Inward	Outward
252 tons of manure and lime 12 cattle 4 cwt. Goods	928 sheep using 11 "J" and 3 "Jc" wagons

This traffic was seen as insufficient to justify retention of the loop and its removal was recommended.

==== Demise: 1960s–1983 ====
Livestock traffic returns for Kopuaranga in the mid-1960s were provided as follows:

Year end	Received	Forwarded
31/Mar/1965	Nil	5xH, 1xHc, 6xJ, 4xJc
31/Mar/1966	7xJ	2xH, 6xJ, 4xJc

Other goods traffic was noted as follows:

Inwards	Outwards
4xLa, 2xLc, 1xU	Nil

It was determined that the volume of goods traffic was insufficient to warrant retention of facilities at Kopuaranga, and with alternatives available at Opaki and Mauriceville, closure to goods traffic was recommended. The Department consulted with the local branch of Federated Farmers in April 1966 who were agreeable to the proposal. Kopuaranga was consequently closed to goods traffic in wagon lots from 1 August 1966.

Further decline in the use of Kopuaranga led to the cancellation of services for parcels and small lots from 24 September 1978. Redundant facilities for this traffic were removed shortly thereafter.

A report on minor stations in the Wairarapa in the early 1980s noted of Kopuaranga that passenger traffic had fallen to negligible levels. There was no town nearby so the station served only neighbouring farmhouses. It was recommended that the station be closed to all traffic, which took effect on 1 August 1983.

=== Facilities ===
At the time the line opened in 1886, a private level crossing was also formed south of the station. There was no road leading up to either side of the level crossing, and it was not until 1888 that land was taken for this purpose and later a road formed thereon. However, the level crossing remained private with no legal road access across the railway line at this location, and thus the practice of using the station yard as a thoroughfare to cross the line continued. In 1935 it was decided to convert the existing level crossing to a public crossing, which would involve the replacement of the crossing gates with cattlestops. Work was carried out the following year by the Department and the Masterton County Council.

Facilities provided by the Department included a passenger platform and shelter, a crossing loop with a capacity of 51 wagons, a goods shed, and a loading bank. The passenger platform was extended in the mid-1940s to accommodate trains of up to eight carriages, approx. 550 feet (170 m) in length.

A small butter factory was also located in the station yard.

Following complaints made by locals about the state of the passenger shelter, it was decided in 1904 to upgrade it by adding a floor and window. A small lockable shed was also installed for the storage of small lots, which had previously been left in the passenger shelter.

A portable stock loading race and pen was constructed at the station by a local farmer in 1947 using materials provided by the Department. After difficulty was experienced with using the detachable race to load double-decker stock wagons, lifting equipment (including a hoist and winch) was provided in 1951.

The timber-fronted loading bank had deteriorated to a point where it was reported to be in a dangerous condition in 1953. After initial consideration given to renewing the front of the bank in concrete, it was decided that the bank was no longer required and it was removed in early 1955.

When the loading race was destroyed in a shunting accident in 1955 it was proposed to close the station to all goods traffic on account of the low volume handled there. This move was delayed, at first by a desire to retain the loop for train crossing purposes should that be required by a change in traffic patterns brought about by the Rimutaka Tunnel, and later by objections from local farmers. The farmers wanted to construct a permanent cattle yard and extend the existing sheep holding yard to increase their throughput at the station. The Department was agreeable to the proposal on the understanding that goods traffic at the station would increase, and supplied the materials to the farmers who carried out the work, completed in 1959.

At the cessation of goods traffic in 1966, it was noted that facilities at the station included the passenger shelter and platform, cattle and sheep yards, and a 49 wagon capacity loop. Tenders were to be called for the removal of the stockyards once goods traffic stopped. By November 1966 the turnouts and siding had been removed. Following an approach made by two local farmers wanting to lease the cattleyards, it was decided to retain them for this purpose but the sheep yard, then in poor condition, was sold for removal.

By the time the station was closed to all but passenger traffic in 1978, the only facilities retained by the Department at the station were the passenger shelter and platform.

== Today ==
All that remains of the station is the cattle yard and the passenger platform.

For a period of seven years from 27 November 1988, the northern section of the Wairarapa Line was effectively mothballed, with no trains scheduled to pass through Kopuaranga. Congestion on the Wellington – Palmerston North section of the NIMT led to the rescheduling of the Wellington – Napier freight services to run via the Wairarapa from 14 August 1995. Following the daylighting of tunnels Nos. 3, 4, 5 on the Palmerston North–Gisborne Line in Q3 2008, and thus the removal of the impediment to running hi-cube containers through the Manawatū Gorge, the Wellington – Napier freight services were redirected to their original route from Q4 2008.
