= Mauriceville railway station =

Defunct railway station in New Zealand

Mauriceville
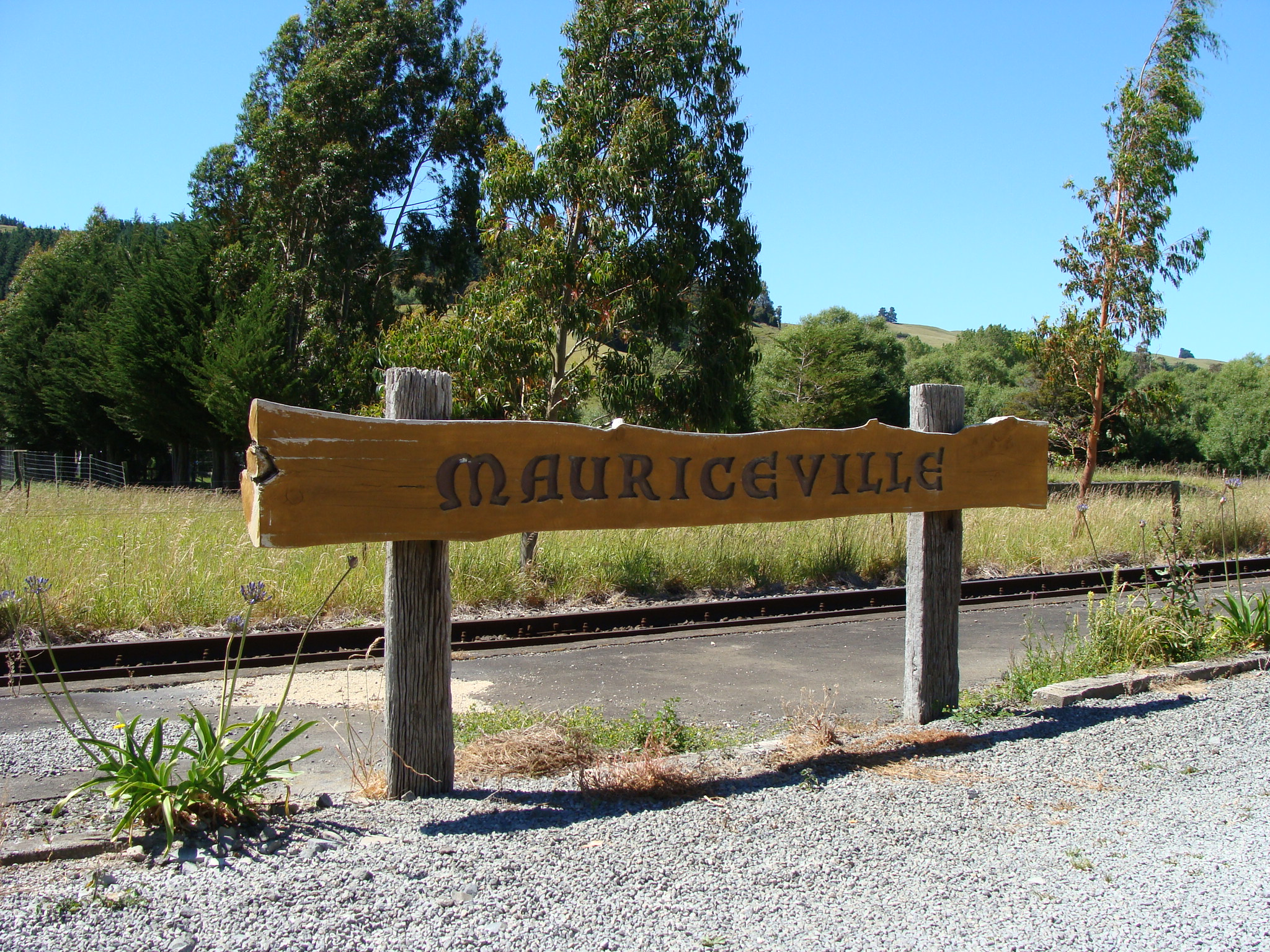
- Mauriceville railway station name board. 28 December 2008.

General information
- Location: Opaki Kaiparoro Road, Mauriceville, New Zealand
- Coordinates: 40°46′45.08″S 175°42′0.42″E
- Elevation: 220 metres (720 ft)
- System: New Zealand Government Railways (NZGR) regional rail
- Owner: Railways Department
- Line: Wairarapa Line
- Distance: 110.56 kilometres (68.70 mi) from Wellington
- Platforms: Single side
- Tracks: Main line (x1); Wagon loop (x1); Private siding (x1)

Construction
- Parking: Yes

History
- Opened: 14 June 1886
- Closed: 18 August 1984 (general freight); 1 August 1988 (passengers)
Location
Notes
- Previous Station: Kopuaranga Station; Next Station: Mangamahoe Station

Mauriceville railway station was a rural railway station that served the small village of Mauriceville in the Wairarapa region of New Zealand’s North Island. It was located on the Wairarapa Line between the stations of Kopuaranga (to the south) and Mangamahoe (to the north) with direct vehicular access from Opaki Kaiparoro Road.

The station opened to all traffic in 1886 and was in service for 102 years until closed to both goods and passenger traffic in the 1980s. For many years it was a station of some importance and supported a small complement of staff.

== History ==
=== Operation ===
==== Early years: 1886 – 1897 ====
When the station opened in mid-1886, Mauriceville was served by mixed trains that had already been providing services to stations further south on those sections of the line that were opened as the railway line made its way north. Mauriceville was briefly the railhead (for seven months) until Mangamahoe opened early the next year followed by Eketahuna two years later. Mixed trains continued to provide the only regular passenger services to Mauriceville until the completion of the line through to Woodville in 1897.

==== Heyday: 1897 – 1908 ====
At the time the Wairarapa Line was completed, the Wellington – Longburn line was owned and operated by the privately held Wellington and Manawatu Railway Company, meaning all government trains from Wellington to destinations north ran via the Wairarapa, ascribing a status of some importance to stations like Mauriceville. The popular Napier Mail trains were diverted from their original Napier – Palmerston North route to run via the Wairarapa to Wellington, and became the main passenger service stopping at Mauriceville, supplementing the mixed trains that continued to run on this section.

==== Halcyon years: 1908 – 1988 ====
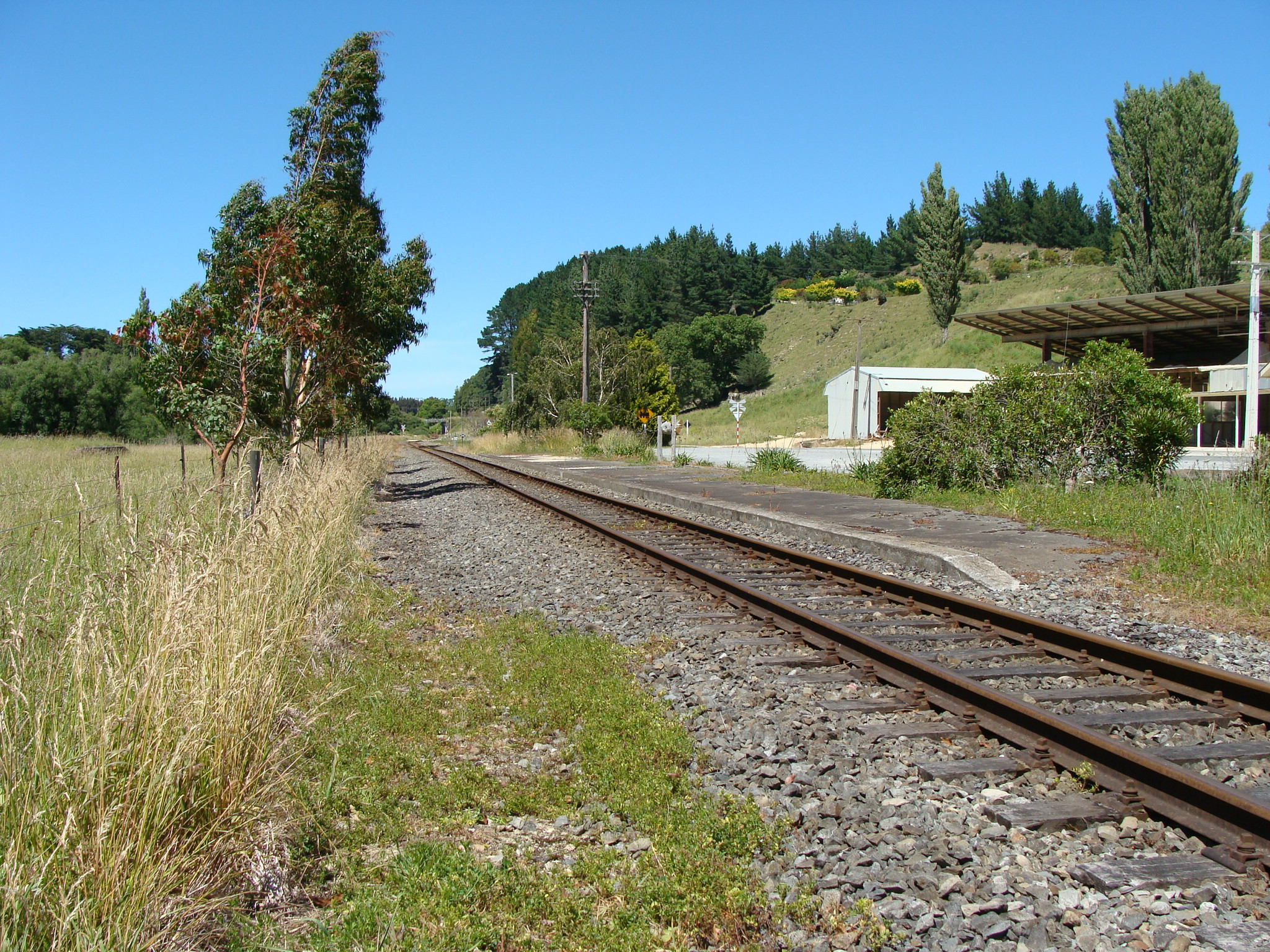
Main station platform.

The Wellington and Manawatu Railway Company's line from Wellington to Longburn was purchased by the government in 1908, which had an effect on services provided in the Wairarapa, particularly the section of the line north of Masterton. Because of the lengthy and costly delays associated with the operation of the Rimutaka Incline, much freight traffic from the northern Wairarapa region was diverted north through Woodville and Palmerston North so it could be taken down the Main Trunk Line to Wellington. Mixed trains, however, continued to operate through Mauriceville.

Shortly after the nationalisation of the WMR line, the Napier Express was diverted in 1909 from the Wairarapa Line to run through the Manawatū Gorge and down the former WMR line to Wellington. Thereafter, the main passenger service to stop at Mauriceville was its replacement, the Wairarapa Mail. A new passenger-only service was provided from 1936 with the introduction of the Wairarapa-class railcars, which supplemented and later replaced the Wairarapa Mail in 1948. The Wairarapa railcars were in turn replaced after the opening of the Rimutaka Tunnel in 1955 by the twinset railcars, which provided the main passenger service for Mauriceville for the next 22 years. The 1959 railcar timetable shows two north-bound and two south-bound railcar services stopping at Mauriceville each day of the week, with a third service on Fridays. During the period in which railcar services were provided through Mauriceville, locomotive-hauled carriage trains were occasionally provided when demand exceeded the capacity of the railcars, but finally replaced railcar services altogether in 1977.

It was proposed in a memorandum of 25 June 1968 to convert Mauriceville to a "switch-out" tablet station to reduce operating expenses for the Traffic Department. There were few train crossings in weekends, and staff were only required to be in attendance for tablet purposes. The timetabling of trains between Eketahuna and Masterton precluded the reduction of staff hours during the week. It was later noted in 1976 that the station had been demoted to a flag station "a few years ago" and an employee and his house were removed at around the same time.

The local member for parliament was advised by the Railways Department in October 1980 that a recent review of smaller stations had concluded for Mauriceville that it should be closed to all traffic but passengers and wagon lots including private siding traffic. Also, the goods shed would be closed and surplus track lifted when the opportunity arose. Inward goods to Mauriceville amounted to 6,454 tonnes (of which 6,300 tonnes was manure for the Mauriceville Lime Company private siding) for the year ended March 1980, and outward traffic totalled 129 tonnes, mainly wool. There was a small but steady flow of passengers through the station because of the lack of alternatives for public transport. After consulting with affected parties it was decided to keep Mauriceville open for all traffic and to review this position when the goods shed required major maintenance.

After the railcar services were withdrawn, patronage of passenger services on the northern section of the Wairarapa Line gradually declined as roads in the region improved. Demand finally dropped to a point where the service was no longer economical and consequently the last Palmerston North – Masterton – Wellington and return service was withdrawn from 1 August 1988, a move that marked the closure of Mauriceville station to all passenger services. Consignment of general freight had ceased several years earlier in 1984 though the use of private sidings continued. Hatuma Lime last used the station in 1989 when they shipped approximately 10,000 tonnes of dicalcic phosphate into Mauriceville.

=== Facilities ===
Facilities provided at Mauriceville included a small station building, measuring 11.5 by 9.5 feet (3.5 by 2.9 m), a platform, goods shed, and loading bank. Just 11 years after opening, it was remarked that "the office is not large enough to properly conduct the work already transacted", a problem that was only exacerbated that year when Morse telegraphy equipment was installed. Extensions to the building were called for in 1898 when the installation of a telephone booth was requested, and again in 1900 when additional accommodation for parcels was required. Further alterations were required in 1907 when tablet instruments were installed. The loading bank was reconstructed in 1925.

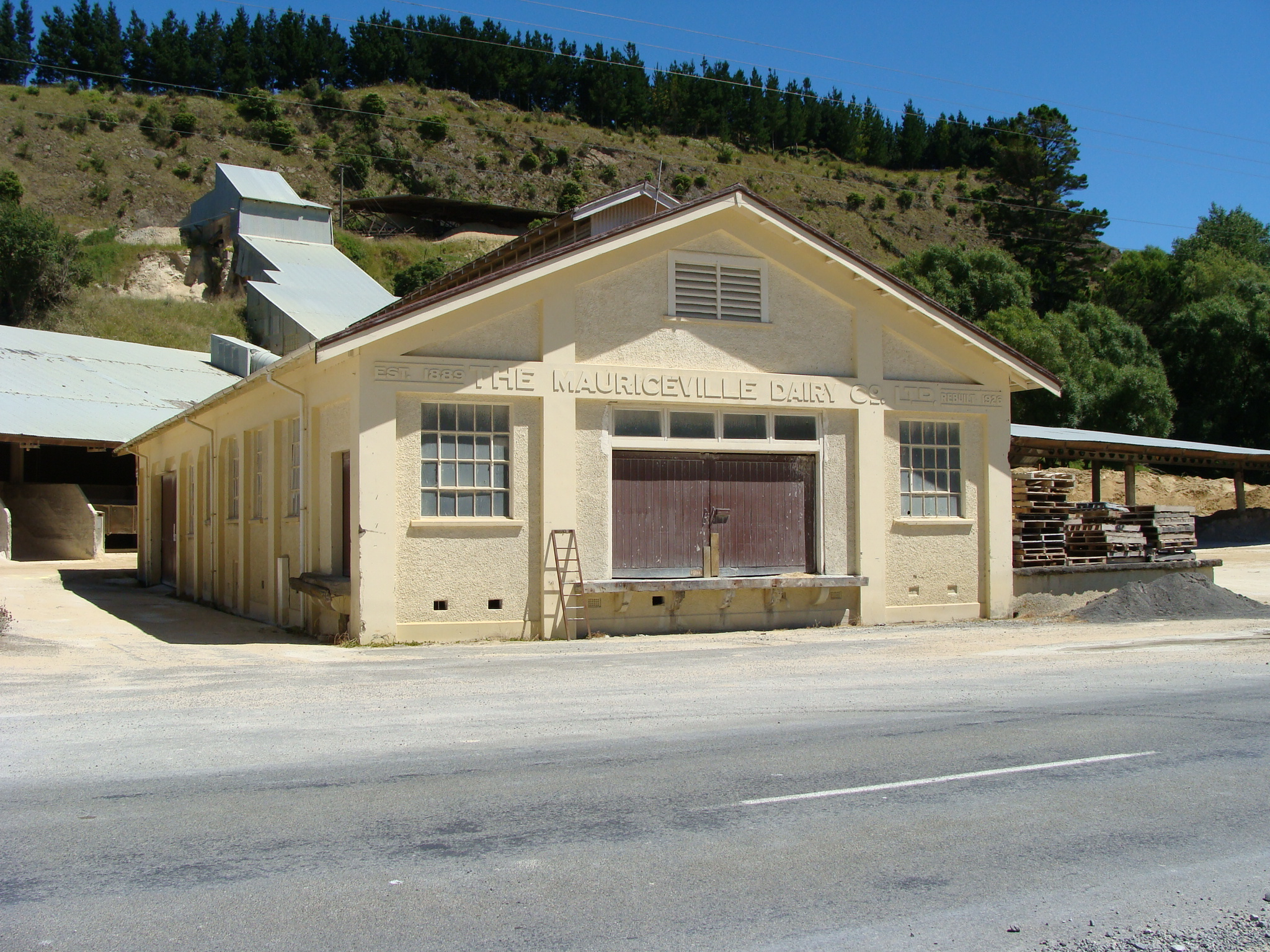
Former Mauriceville Dairy Company building.

Following representations from the National Dairy Association on behalf of the Mauriceville Dairy Company, the department had a luggage room constructed at Mauriceville in 1900. Concerns had been expressed about the practice of storing dairy products, particularly butter, on the platform and under tarpaulins in roadside wagons, and it was desired to have a room in which to keep such goods to reduce the possibility of spoilage. In 1923 the District Traffic Manager requested the construction of a new storeroom in which to keep goods, primarily bundles of lime bags. As this storeroom could not be attached to the end of the station building as originally requested, the job was quoted as a stand-alone building. A cart dock was built at the north end of the platform in 1930.

The Mauriceville Dairy Company, as a major customer of the railways at Mauriceville, had several alterations made to the station at various times including the laying of a track across the main road (which at the time was not sealed) between the station and the dairy factory, the laying of a concrete path from the station platform to the road, and the widening of gates in the station fence to allow the passage of barrows used to transport cans of cream. By 1930 it had become apparent that the dumping of cream cans from the trains onto the platform – a common practice to minimise delays to the trains – was causing premature deterioration of the platform surface. It was requested that part of the platform be re-laid in concrete slabs, but in 1933 it was decided to instead only renew the front of the platform in concrete and to lay asphalt with a greater thickness on the area where extra strength was required.

The Railways Department requested the Mauriceville County Council to seal the roadway in front of the station in February 1939, with work being completed by the following April.

Renovation of the station building was authorised in 1951 with the following schedule of work:

- Renew piles, level-up and repair of the floor.
- Removal of two small "lean-to" structures attached to the building and formerly used by the Post & Telegraph Department and as a telephone booth respectively.
- Repair of roof and drains.
- Install ceiling and interior lining.
- Painting.

The department was advised on 20 September 1954 that the work had been completed.

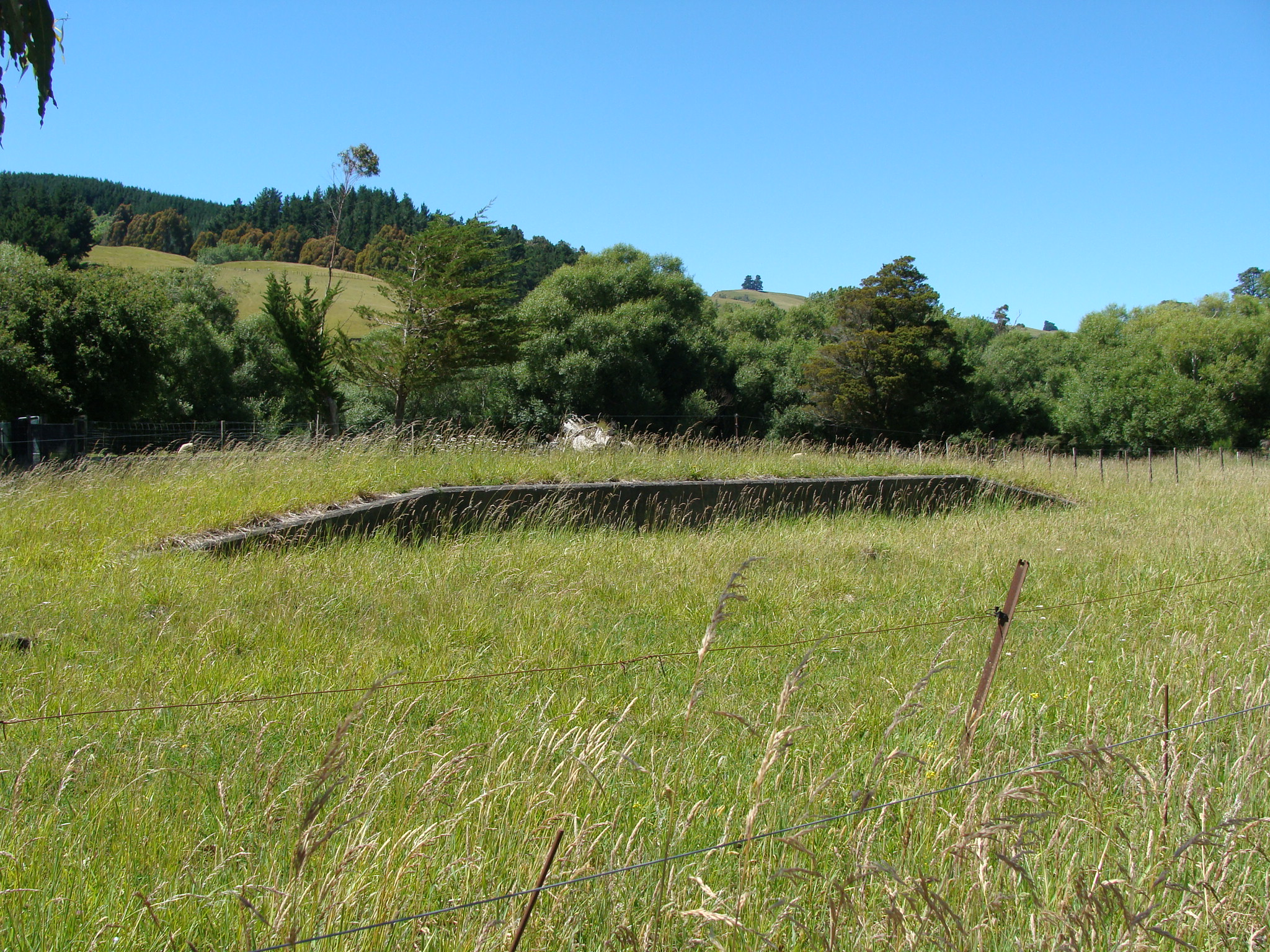
Loading bank.

Preparations were made in 1952 for the increase in traffic levels expected to follow the opening of the Rimutaka tunnel. Provision of £1,700 was made in the 1953 Capital Estimates for the installation of a new crossing loop at Mauriceville, which would be used for three train crossings and the storage of wagons from the neighbouring lime works. Three train crossings had only been possible at Mauriceville on previous occasions when one of the trains was a railcar which could use the lime works siding, otherwise delays were experienced when trains had to be held at Masterton or Eketahuna because of insufficient space at Mauriceville. A decision on the new crossing loop was deferred when alterations were made to the timetable to eliminate the need for three train crossings at Mauriceville. In 1957, after the department had had a chance to assess the impact of the Rimutaka tunnel on traffic levels and freight operations in the Wairarapa, the replacement of the existing 50-wagon crossing loop at Mauriceville with a new 97-wagon capacity loop was authorised at a cost of £5,460. The opportunity was also taken to replace mechanically operated signals with colour-light signals.

It was proposed in 1975 to relocate the Mauriceville goods shed to Lower Hutt where staff had reported congestion in the handling of goods. The Mauriceville shed was considered to be in good condition, and to be in excess of requirements. Wairarapa Federated Farmers were consulted and raised no objections to the proposal owing to the little use the goods shed received and that there was sufficient storage space in the station building. The following figures were supplied in support of this contention:

Year Ending 31/Mar	Small lots out		Parcels out	Goods N.O.S. in		Small lots in	
Year Ending 31/Mar	Tons	Revenue $	Revenue $	Tons	Revenue $	Tons	Revenue $
1971	0.4	13	2	9.6	149	1.3	47
1972	1.0	56	21	13.3	92	1.7	42
1973	0.6	54	14	4.9	40	2.1	55
1974	0.7	56	25	16.5	104	1.9	65
1975	1.0	37	3	6.6	49	2.1	49

Closure of the goods shed at Mauriceville and its removal to Lower Hutt was approved on 27 November 1975. However, when advising the District Engineer of the decision to move the goods shed, the Chief Engineer also instructed him to not incur any expense related to the move until after 31 March 1976.

Despite initial indications that the goods shed would no longer be required, a local resident raised an objection to its removal in January 1976. It was pointed out that the shed was in fact used to store wool and skins pending shipment out by rail, and to hold inward goods until they could be collected. The department was requested to defer the removal of the shed pending further submissions on the case for its retention, to which the department agreed. After a public meeting in March at which the issue was discussed and a motion passed to have the shed repaired where it stood, the department delayed any action on the removal of the shed pending collection of further usage data which would be used to review the proposal. The survey was conducted from 23 April to 22 October 1976 and produced the following figures:

	Packages despatched		Packages received	
	Road	Rail	Road	Rail
April	Nil	Nil	Nil	Nil
May	-	1	3	-
June	6	2	4	-
July	2	4	5	23
August	-	5	24	-
September	3	7	-	-
October	5	1	-	-
Totals	16	20	36	23

During the period covered by the survey the following goods were trafficked through Mauriceville: parcels, bundles of skins, bales of wool, stockfoods, cases of fruit, farming material, and household furnishings. It was considered that though this amount of traffic was small, it was typical of a rural railway station like Mauriceville, and it was recommended that the goods shed should not be closed for at least two more years, a decision that was confirmed in January 1977.

The stockyards at several Wairarapa stations, including Mauriceville, were closed on 25 February 1980. The District Engineer advised on 4 August 1980 that the Mauriceville stockyards had been completely cleared away and materials sold to a Masterton resident for $284.48.

A review of the future of smaller Wairarapa stations in September 1980 made the following points about Mauriceville: the station consisted of a 73-wagon capacity crossing loop and 2 yard sidings; a private siding for the Mauriceville Lime Company had recently been opened; the goods shed had no doors and was used mainly by local residents for general storage; the station building was larger than required but in reasonable condition. It was decided to retain the goods shed until such time as it required major maintenance.

==== Post & Telegraph Office ====
The Mauriceville Post Office was accommodated in the station building and was staffed, by arrangement with the Chief Postmaster (Masterton), by members of the railways Traffic Department. This meant that the post office was not a full-time operation, with staff also having to attend to their railways work while on duty.

The Post & Telegraph Department erected a telegraph line between Woodville and Wellington via Masterton in 1897 for the use of the Railways Department. It was intended to install Morse telegraphy equipment in existing Railways Department offices along the line, but in the case of Mauriceville it was noted that there was insufficient space to do so. Additional space was requested for the new equipment, as well as the construction of a sound-proof telephone box to provide privacy for the transmission of telegrams.

Following a public meeting in 1908, the Post & Telegraph Department was approached with a request to arrange for alternative facilities for the post office on the grounds that the accommodation in the station building was insufficient and unsatisfactory. The department considered that the amount of business at Mauriceville did not warrant this, and instead appointed a telegraph message-boy to deliver telegrams and provide general assistance, and requested the Railways Department to advise on the feasibility of providing sufficient space in the station building for 12 private post boxes and space for a telephone exchange if one was justified at some point in the future. The Railways Department advised that there would be room for a telephone exchange, but that there was no convenient location for all of the requested post boxes.

The Post Office's Superintendent of Electric Lines sought to make Mauriceville a Morse office in 1910, a proposal to which the Railways Department had no objection. It was noted that Mauriceville was already a telegraph testing station, and that both the Stationmaster and clerk were telegraph operators.

In 1945 an inspection tour of railways facilities around the North Island made the following notes on the station building at Mauriceville: "Badly cramped in combined Railway and Post Office. Find out if Post Office will continue with us. Get plan and report on present building if Post Office are going out. Otherwise, get proposal for new building (Eskdale or Motuhora Branch buildings?)". Though the idea of replacing the station building with one from the Motuhora Branch received favourable consideration, a staff shortage meant no further work was done on it.

Later, in 1947, enquiries were made with the Chief Postmaster as to whether or not the Post Office would continue to require accommodation in the station building. Consideration was given to both the option of replacing the station building with one having sufficient room for the business of both the Railways Department and the Post & Telegraph Department, and to the option of the department discontinuing post office duties and the establishment of a separate post office staffed by members of that department. The District Traffic Manager noted on 25 July 1947 that an inquiry had recently been received from the Post & Telegraph Department as to whether additional space could be provided in the station building to accommodate their requirements. When the Railways Department declined the request the Post & Telegraph Department asked on 1 August for a lease on a small area of land at the north end of the station for the erection and operation of a temporary post office pending the acquisition of a more suitable site for a permanent building. The Railways Department agreed to lease the land requested for £5 per annum with the change effective from 10 April 1948. Mail continued to be shipped in and out of Mauriceville by rail, with the Stationmaster assuming custody of the mail bags outside of post office working hours where necessary to meet timetabled railcar services.

== Today ==
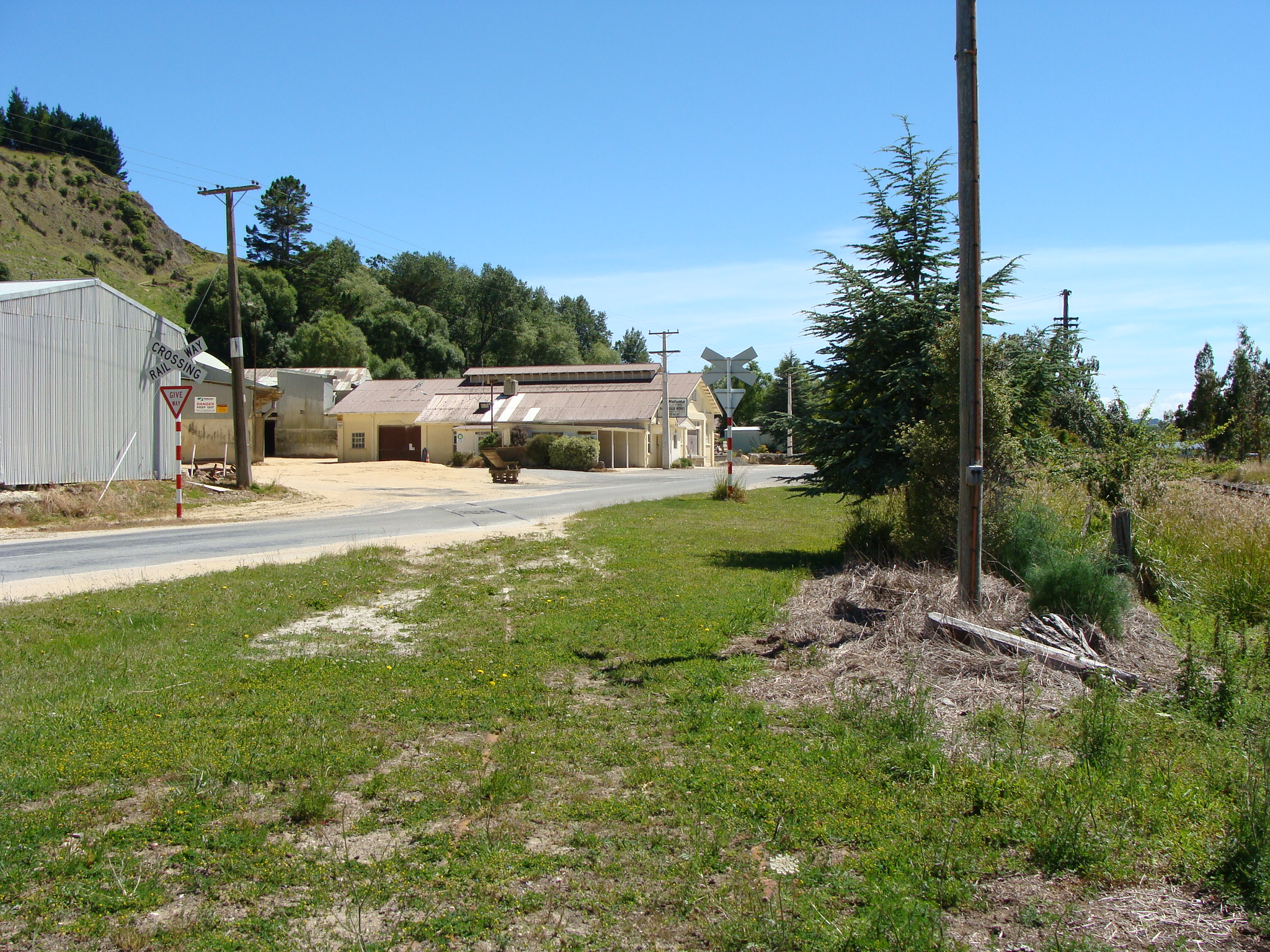
Hatuma Lime Company's private siding and level crossing.

All of the railway-related buildings have been removed from the site, but there are still signs of the station itself and some of its facilities for the handling of passenger and goods traffic. Still extant are the station platform, a wagon loop, a private siding, and the loading bank in a neighbouring field. A station name board has been erected on the platform.

Across the road from the station is the Hatuma Lime Company, a former customer of the railway, but now using trucks to transport its product. Also on the same site is a building originally erected for the Mauriceville Dairy Company, another former customer of the railway, but a business that has long since ceased operating. Hatuma Lime have considered supplying lime by rail from their Mauriceville works but were dissuaded from doing so by uncertainty surrounding the future of the northern Wairarapa Line.

For a period of seven years from 27 November 1988, the northern section of the Wairarapa Line was effectively mothballed, with no trains scheduled to pass through Mauriceville. Congestion on the Wellington – Palmerston North section of the NIMT led to the rescheduling of the Wellington – Napier freight services to run via the Wairarapa from 14 August 1995. Following the daylighting of tunnels Nos. 3, 4, 5 on the Palmerston North - Gisborne Line in Q3 2008, and thus the removal of the impediment to running hi-cube containers through the Manawatū Gorge, the Wellington – Napier freight services were redirected to their original route from Q4 2008. Mauriceville has been used occasionally by rail heritage organisations in more recent times as a destination for excursion trains.
