= Eketahuna railway station =

Railway station in New Zealand

Eketahuna
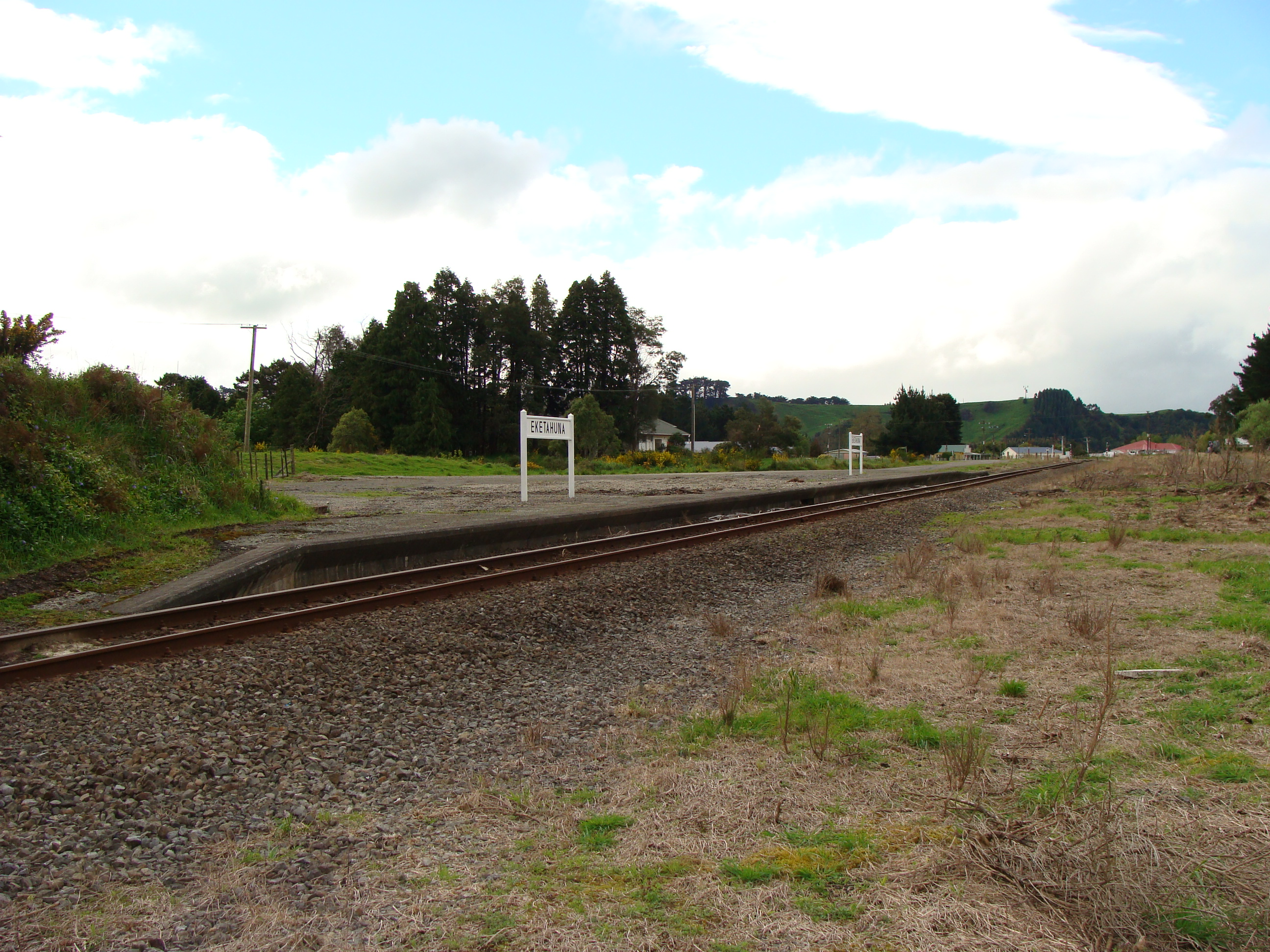
- Eketahuna Station, October 2008.

General information
- Location: Herbert Street; Eketāhuna; New Zealand
- Coordinates: 40°38′58.37″S 175°42′23.46″E
- Elevation: 230 metres (750 ft)
- System: New Zealand Government Railways regional rail
- Owner: Railways Department; KiwiRail
- Operator: Railways Department (1889–1988)
- Line: Wairarapa Line
- Distance: 126.82 kilometres (78.80 mi) from Wellington
- Platforms: single side
- Tracks: main line (single)
- Train operators: New Zealand Government Railways (1889–1988); Pahiatua Railcar Society; Steam Incorporated; Feilding and District Steam Rail Society

Construction
- Structure type: at-grade
- Parking: yes

History
- Opened: 8 April 1889
- Closed: 13 October 1986 (freight); 1 August 1988 (passengers)

Key dates
- 10 May 2014: re-opened (heritage rail operators only)
Location
Notes
- Previous Station: Mangamahoe Station; Next Station: Newman Station

Eketahuna railway station was a station on the Wairarapa Line, a railway line that runs through the Wairarapa region of New Zealand's North Island. Located between the stations of Mangamahoe (to the south) and Newman (to the north), it served the small southern Tararua town of Eketāhuna and was one of the few attended stations on the northern section of the line.

The railhead of the Wairarapa Line was at Eketāhuna from when the station opened in 1889 until 1896, and later it continued to be an important station for the surrounding rural area. Closure to all traffic came in 1988 after improvements to local and regional roads contributed to a decline in the patronage of passenger rail services.

== History ==
=== Operation ===
==== Early years (1889–1897) ====
It was with great excitement that the residents of Eketāhuna greeted the first train to their town on 8 April 1889. The official party aboard the train included the Minister of Public Works (Edwin Mitchelson), Minister of Lands (George Richardson), Commissioner of Railways (J. C. McKerrow), Speaker of the Legislative Council (William Fitzherbert), a former mayor of Wellington (S. Brown), as well as several department heads and spouses. On its way north, the train had avoided stopping at any of the flag stations between Upper Hutt and Masterton, where it stopped, before continuing its journey with brief stops at Mauriceville and Mangamahoe. Around 400 people received the train after it passed under two arches that had been erected south of the station yard for the occasion.

The station enjoyed a period of intense activity as the terminus of the line including the shipment of large quantities of timber, wool, and butter in season. Passengers heading north to destinations including Woodville, Palmerston North, and Napier had to transfer to stagecoaches to continue their journeys, while those stopping over in Eketahuna were catered for by the Railway Hotel, a neighbour of the station, and also the Temperance Hotel and Commercial Hotel.

==== Heyday (1897–1908) ====
Over the eight-year period following the opening of the station, the Wellington – Woodville railway slowly advanced northwards, being progressively opened first to freight, and later to passenger services. Eketahuna was the terminus of the line until 1896, after which it was a stop on the government’s only rail line north out of Wellington.

With the full line to Woodville open, the Napier Express passenger trains were diverted from the Palmerston North terminus to run from Woodville down the Wairarapa Line to Wellington and were known as the Napier Mail. This became the main passenger service through Eketahuna, supplementing the mixed trains that had served Eketahuna up to this time.

Timber was the most significant source of freight traffic during this period, as the surrounding hinterlands were still largely covered in forest, providing much work for the sawmillers. However, the Great Fire of 1908 destroyed much of the remaining verdant growth, significantly curtailing this trade. It was only after the land was cleared following the fire that agriculture rose in importance and replaced timber as the dominant source of business for the railway. The station also catered for other seasonal traffic such as fruit.

==== Royal visit (1920) ====
Edward, Prince of Wales, was to have been the guest of honour at a civic reception organised for 5 May 1920 when the people of Eketahuna were advised two days prior that the royal train would be passing through Eketahuna on its way to Wellington. The occasion was the prince’s royal tour of New Zealand to thank its residents for their support during the Great War.

Officials advised that because of a tight schedule the train would not be able to stop in Eketahuna, but would slow when passing through the station so the people would have a chance to see the prince on the train. The town’s administration had other ideas and surmised that the train would have to stop in Eketahuna anyway to water the locomotive. Therefore, preparations were hurriedly made, in expectation of a stop at Eketahuna being added to the schedule.

When the train arrived at Eketahuna it stopped at the water vat on approach to the station, which was too far from the platform for any meeting to take place. The prince alighted from the train and began to make his way towards the waiting crowd, which had started to make their own way towards the train. He had only time to cross one track before the departure signal was given and had to quickly rejoin the train as it left the station yard at speed. Those waiting to meet the royal visitor only had a moment to see the prince on the rear platform of the last carriage.

==== Halcyon years (1908–1988) ====
The Wellington and Manawatu Railway Company’s line from Wellington to Longburn was purchased by the government in 1908 which had an effect on services provided in the Wairarapa, particularly the section of the line north of Masterton. Because of the lengthy and costly delays associated with the operation of the Rimutaka Incline, much freight traffic from the northern Wairarapa region was diverted north through Woodville and Palmerston North so it could be taken down the Main Trunk Line to Wellington. Mixed trains, however, continued to operate through Eketahuna.

Horses were used for many years for shunting duties in the station yard during stock season. It was noted that at this time of year they were used up to four times a week. In 1922 it was requested that the cattle-stop on the stockyard siding – which crossed a public road at the north end of the yard – be planked between the rails to enable the use of horses to place wagons at the loading bank. Prior to this request, consigners pushed wagons by hand across the road to a point where they could be worked by horses.

Shortly after the nationalisation of the WMR line the Napier Express was diverted from the Wairarapa Line to run through the Manawatū Gorge and down the Manawatu line to Wellington. Thereafter, the main passenger service to stop at Eketahuna was its replacement, the Wairarapa Mail. A new passenger-only service was provided from 1936 with the introduction of the RM class Wairarapa-type railcars, which supplemented and later replaced the Wairarapa Mail in 1948. The Wairarapa railcars were in turn replaced after the opening of the Rimutaka Tunnel in 1955 by the twinset railcars, which provided the main passenger service for Eketahuna for the next 22 years. The railcar timetable of 1959 shows two northbound and two southbound railcar services stopping at Eketahuna each day of the week with a third service on Fridays. During the period in which railcar services were provided through Eketahuna, locomotive-hauled carriage trains were occasionally provided when demand exceeded the capacity of the railcars, but finally replaced railcar services altogether in 1977. The NZR stopped accepting consignments of general freight at or for Ekehahuna on 13 October 1986.

Railcar RM 132 came to an ignominious end on 24 August 1975 when it was gutted by fire between Hukanui and Eketahuna while running a southbound service to Wellington. All the passengers and crew managed to escape unharmed but the railcar was a write-off. It was towed to the Eketahuna yard and cut up for scrap.

After the railcar services were withdrawn, patronage of passenger services on the northern section of the Wairarapa Line steadily declined as roads in the region improved. Demand finally dropped to a point where the service was no longer economical, and consequently the Palmerston North – Masterton – Wellington and return service was withdrawn from 1 August 1988. This was the last service to stop at the station and its cancellation resulted in the closure of the station to all traffic.

=== Facilities ===
Initial facilities at the station were befitting of a terminus, and included a station building, goods shed, five sidings, platform, loading bank, and water vat. A postal agency and telegraph office also operated from the station building. A staff complement commensurate with this operation was also required, which included a stationmaster, two clerks, three porters, one guard, one telegraph operator, three locomotive engineers, two firemen, and a cleaner.

An inspection of railway infrastructure in Wairarapa carried out in February 1960 reported of Eketahuna that the station building was old but in reasonable condition and was last painted in 1951. The goods shed was also said to be old but in a fair condition, and there were also three "relatively new" houses plus two older ones.

After Eketahuna was closed to freight traffic in 1986 the goods shed and loading shelter were disposed of and the trackwork was further rationalised.

==== Platform ====
The timber-fronted station platform was built-up and extended from 160 feet (49 m) in 1900, and again lengthened in 1906 by 200 feet (61 m). By 1936 the platform had deteriorated to a point where urgent repairs were necessary, which were duly carried out in March. However, only two years later the platform was again in a poor state and a request was made for remedial work to be carried out. In March 1939 the request was approved, and it was decided to rebuild the platform sometime in the following 12 months. The work entailed replacing the front of the platform, reducing its length from 420 feet (130 m) to 250 feet (76 m) as the excess length was deemed surplus to requirements, and raising the height of the platform from 11 inches (280 mm) above rail level to 18 inches (460 mm) which would enable the platform to slope down towards the station building. The tablet exchanger would be located at the top of the south ramp of the platform.

==== Stockyards ====
The importance of livestock traffic at Eketahuna required numerous modifications to facilities to improve the transfer of animals to and from rail and augment capacity at the station. The backshunt servicing the cattle yards was extended in 1902 to increase its capacity to 20 wagons and in 1904 the sheep yards were enlarged to increase capacity from 300 head to 1,400 head. A water supply and trough was added to the stockyards in 1914.

In 1907 the construction of holding yards was authorised. They were located to the east of the main line, north of the Eketahuna station yard on the other side of Alfredton Road. This space was divided into three parts and was a short distance from the existing stockyards at the north end of the station yard on the south side of the road. The water supply was extended to the holding yards in 1928 using the Department’s own water source, and a pen suitable for holding pigs was added in 1930.

With the increasing popularity of trucks for transporting stock to and from the station, a sheep loading race was requested and approved in 1936. The existing livestock facilities at Eketahuna had been designed to cater for stock to be driven to the station, and the practice of unloading stock from trucks directly onto the ground increased the likelihood of stock sustaining injury. A similar request for a cattle loading race was made and recommended in 1956 at which time it was pointed out that around 90% of livestock trafficked through Eketahuna were transported by lorry.

The pig yards were reported in 1974 to be in a state of disrepair to the point of being unusable. It was decided that they were surplus to requirements and their removal was approved. It was noted, however, that the sheep and cattle yards were still required and needed to be maintained to a usable standard.

Track renewal work in the Eketahuna station yard prompted a request to dispose of the stockyards in 1979 to simplify the new layout. By this time the livestock traffic through Eketahuna was reported to be "negligible" and the stockyards were no longer being used. The request was approved and the stockyards were sold for removal to the Eketahuna County Council in 1980.

==== Yard and loading banks ====
In 1923 the station yard was extended by 400 yards (370 m) at the south end to enable the installation of a backshunt and crossover. This work also involved the relocation of the home signal and the extension of the north backshunt by 4 chains (260 ft; 80 m). Later that year, a siding at the north end of the yard used by locomotives to access the water column was extended 10 feet (3.0 m) to enable larger locomotives, such as the A-class, to be watered there. The backshunt was again extended and a new loading bank constructed in 1925, with work being completed in October of that year. The main loading bank at Eketahuna was renewed with a concrete front and extended in length by 15 feet (4.6 m) in 1954.

==== Coal siding ====
After falling into disuse, the siding to the coal shed was removed in October 1929 and the engine pit was also filled in at around this time. It was advised that the coal shed was surplus to requirements and could be replaced by a smaller structure for use by the track gangers.

==== Locomotive watering ====
Following the introduction of diesel locomotives to the Wairarapa Line in the 1950s, provision of watering services at stations along the line was reviewed in 1956. At Eketahuna, it was decided to retain the vats at the south end of the yard in case of a requirement to use a relief steam locomotive. The vat at the north end was found to be on a stand in poor condition and was removed in June 1959, with the vat being relocated to Waikokopu.

==== Loading shelter ====
Construction of a loading shelter was approved in September 1961. It was to provide coverage of 44 by 29 feet (13.4 m × 8.8 m) and to allow for the operation of a "pelican grab" loader under its awning. Tenders were called for in March 1962 and the contract was awarded to a Pahiatua company. Work commenced shortly thereafter and was completed several months later in July. Provision of the shelter was requested by commercial operators transferring goods at the station, which at the time handled mainly casein (outwards) and superphosphate (inwards).

== Today ==
The station building was demolished following the cessation of passenger services and all other buildings and sidings from the station's commercial era have also been removed. The only remaining original remnants of the station are the platform, loading bank, and the foundations of a building in the yard. Two station name boards were installed on the platform and a signpost points the way to where the station once was.

For a period of 7 years from 27 November 1988, the northern Wairarapa section of the Wairarapa Line was effectively mothballed, with no trains scheduled to pass through Eketahuna. Congestion on the Wellington – Palmerston North section of the NIMT led to the rescheduling of the Wellington – Napier freight services to run via the Wairarapa from 14 August 1995, and though these services passed through Eketahuna they did not stop there. Following the daylighting of tunnels Nos. 3, 4, 5 on the PNGL in Q3 2008, and thus the removal of the impediment to using hi-cube containers through the Manawatu Gorge, the Wellington – Napier freight services were redirected to their original route.

Passenger excursion trains operated by local rail heritage organisations occasionally pass through or stop at Eketahuna. Heritage rail organisations Steam Incorporated and the Pahiatua Railcar Society have revamped the station for use in their own excursion activities including the relocation of the former Waikanae Station building to the Eketahuna station platform. It was donated to the groups by Greater Wellington Regional Council when the building became surplus to requirements following the extension of Wellington's electrified suburban rail network to Waikanae. The station was officially re-opened on 10 May 2014 and in 2015 the group’s efforts were recognised by the Rail Heritage Trust with the awarding of a Certificate of Merit.
