= Mangamahoe railway station =

Defunct railway station in New Zealand

Mangamahoe
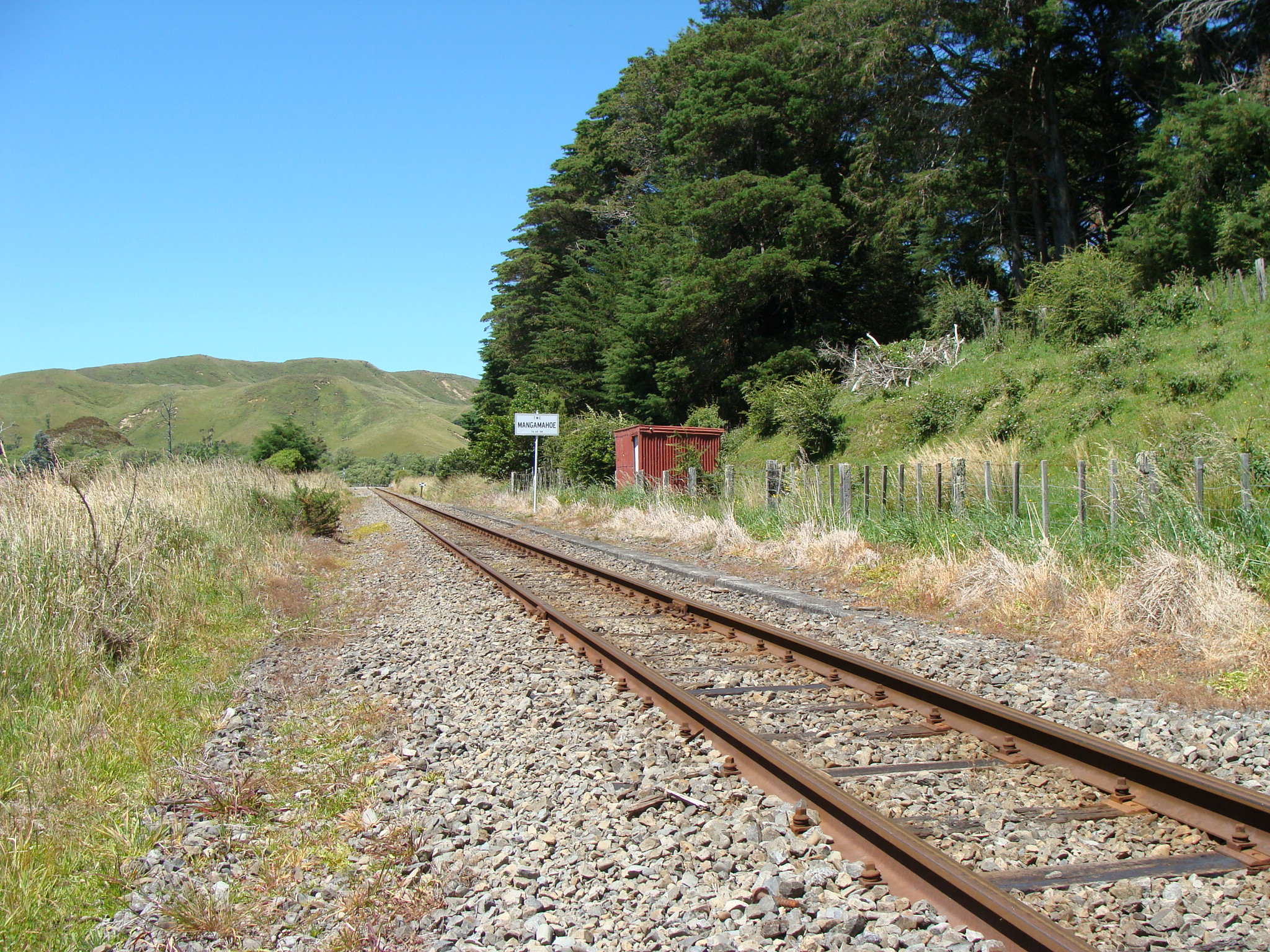
- Mangamahoe railway station, looking south towards Station Road. December 2008.

General information
- Location: Station Road, Wellington 5882, Mauriceville, New Zealand
- Coordinates: 40°43′47.70″S 175°43′31.44″E
- Elevation: 241 metres (791 ft)
- System: New Zealand Government Railways (NZGR) regional rail
- Owner: Railways Department
- Line: Wairarapa Line
- Platforms: Single side
- Tracks: Main (x 1)

History
- Opened: 10 January 1887
- Closed: 1 August 1966 (freight); 9 June 1969 (passengers)
Location
Notes
- Previous Station: Mauriceville Station; Next Station: Eketahuna Station

Mangamahoe railway station served the small rural community of Mangamahoe in the Wairarapa region of New Zealand’s North Island. It was located on the Wairarapa Line between the stations of Mauriceville (to the south) and Eketahuna (to the north) with vehicular access from Station Road. It is the northernmost station site on the Wairarapa Line within the jurisdiction of the Greater Wellington Regional Council before the line passes into territory governed by Horizons Regional Council.

The station opened to all traffic in 1887 and was in service for 82 years, closing to general freight traffic in 1966 and three years later to passengers also.

Mangamāhoe means in English "māhoe (whiteywood) stream".

== History ==
=== Facilities ===
Features typical of a small rural railway station were present at Mangamahoe from its early years as official records mention a wooden-fronted passenger platform (1903), goods shed and station building (1905), wooden-fronted loading bank (1924), staff telephone (1929), and Ways and Works Branch shed (1962). A tablet porter's room was located in the station building and water closets were provided for the convenience of staff and passengers.

The yard contained, in addition to the main line, crossing loops and a stockyards siding. A request was made in 1958 for the crossing loops to be lifted as they had become surplus to requirements with approval being granted the following year. The Inspector of the Permanent Way advised in June 1959 that trap points had been installed at Mangamahoe and the loop roads closed off. Lifting of the loops was deferred until such time as the track gangs became available and it was intended to move the crossing loop to replace the goods shed road which had been laid with light rails.

In 1962 works were undertaken to make the yard fit for the use of Da class locomotives. It was noted that all the tracks remaining in the yard were still required and that both the goods shed and the Way and Works Branch shed had verandas with insufficient clearance for the Da locomotives. As the verandas were no longer required their removal was requested.

Commensurate with the size of the station, the staff complement was also small. A new caretaker is mentioned in 1905 and the tablet porter was withdrawn on 7 April 1929. Following the withdrawal of the porter the station was considered to be an unattended flag station though gangers and train crews performing shunting at Mangamahoe continued to make use of the facilities there when in the area.

=== Services ===
The first trains to serve Mangamahoe were of the mixed variety, being services that had already been running from Wellington up the Wairarapa Line to Masterton. As the railhead moved further north traffic increased as more communities were served and more primary produce could be railed out.

The Wairarapa Line was completed to its ultimate terminus in 1897 which allowed the Railways Department to introduce the Napier Mail train to the Wairarapa Line. This service had been running between Napier and Palmerston North since the line through the Manawatū Gorge had been completed several years earlier. The Napier Mail was the first express passenger service to run regularly on the Wairarapa Line and served the Wairarapa until 1909 when it was diverted to once again run through the Manawatū Gorge and down the North Island Main Trunk to Wellington after the nationalisation of the Wellington and Manawatu Railway the previous year. Thereafter a new express passenger service was introduced to run between Wellington and Woodville, being the Wairarapa Mail, which was essentially the Wellington to Woodville portion of the old Napier Mail.

A new passenger service began in 1936 when the Railways Department introduced the Wairarapa railcars, offering passengers from Mangamahoe a faster and more comfortable service both north to Woodville and south to Wellington. The Wairarapa Mail passenger trains continued to run but in 1944 were reduced from their Monday – Saturday timetable to a thrice weekly service due to a severe coal shortage. It never recovered from this and was withdrawn completely in 1948. Several years later the Rimutaka Tunnel was opened, bringing an end to the mixed trains that had been plying the Wairarapa Line and the withdrawal of the Wairarapa-type railcars. Thereafter the new twin-set railcars provided the only passenger service to Mangamahoe and remained in service until after Mangamahoe was closed to passenger traffic in 1969. The 1959 railcar timetable lists Mangamahoe as a "stops if required" station for both northbound and southbound services.

== Today ==
The only remnants of the station still extant at Mangamahoe are the platform and a shelter shed. All sidings and loops have been removed and the yard is overgrown in tall grass. A Track Warrant Control board identifies the site as Mangamahoe.
