= Newman railway station =

Defunct railway station in New Zealand

Newman
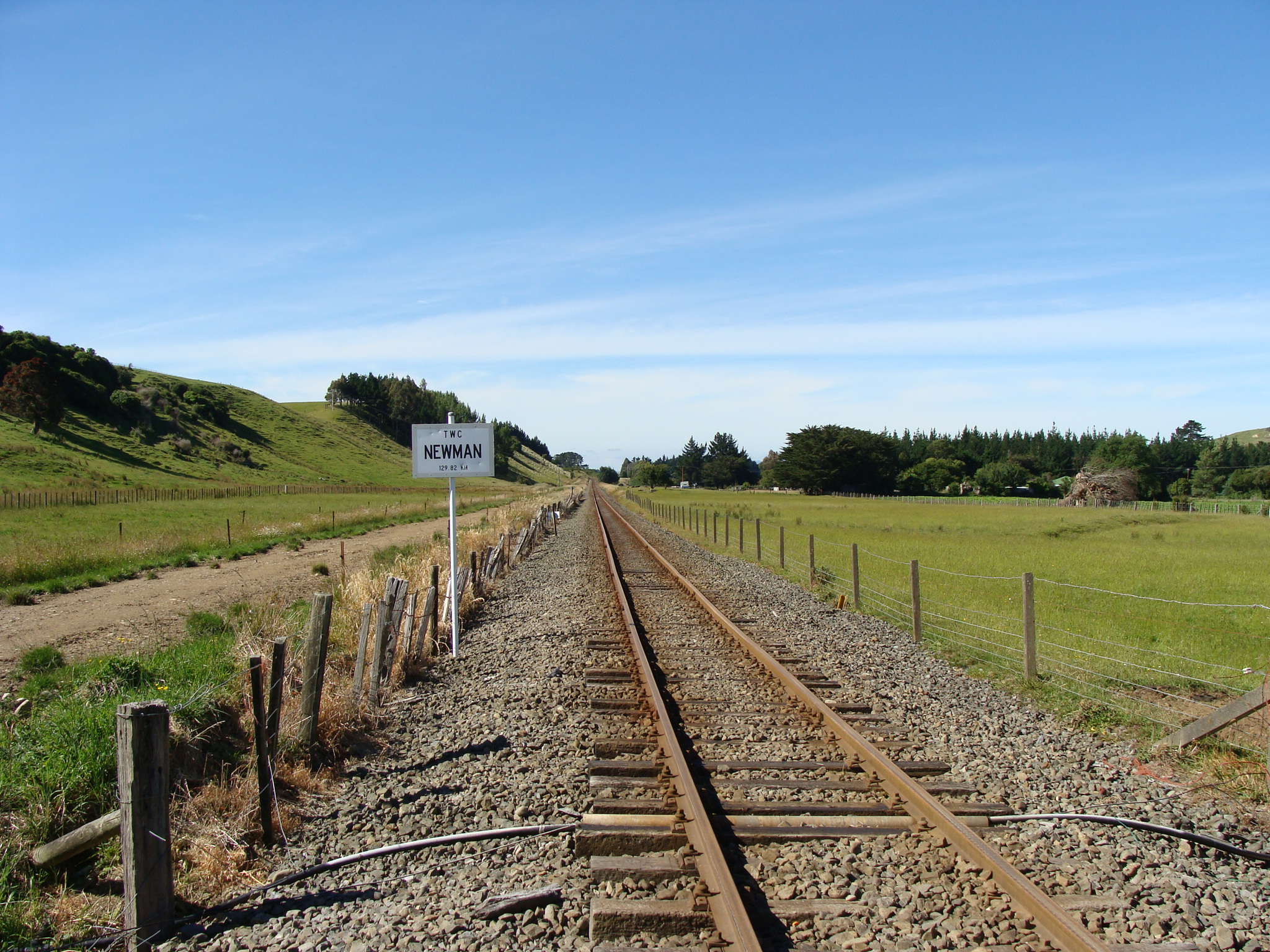
- Newman railway station, from the south. December 2008.

General information
- Location: Cliff Road, Newman, New Zealand
- Coordinates: 40°37′18.62″S 175°42′41.93″E
- Elevation: 199 metres (653 ft)
- System: New Zealand Government Railways (NZGR)
- Owner: Railways Department
- Line: Wairarapa Line
- Distance: 130.18 kilometres (80.89 mi) from Wellington
- Tracks: Single

History
- Opened: 7 February 1896 (freight); 18 March 1896 (passengers)
- Closed: 9 June 1969 (passengers); 12 August 1973 (freight)
Location
Notes
- Previous Station: Eketahuna Station; Next Station: Hukanui Station

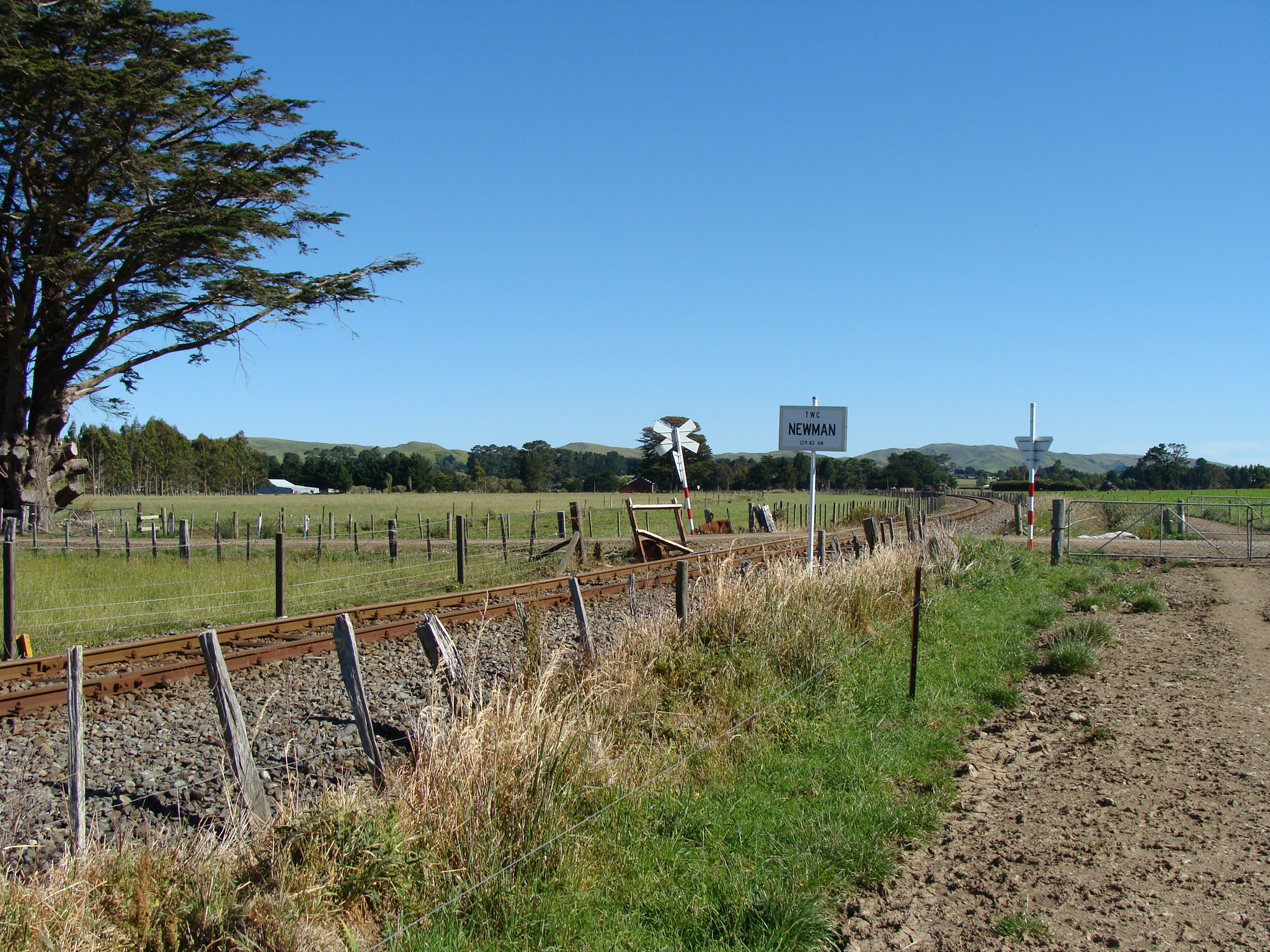
Cliff Road level crossing, south of Newman railway station.

Newman railway station was a station on the Wairarapa Line in the Tararua District area of the Manawatū-Whanganui region of New Zealand’s North Island. It served the small rural community of Newman, 3 kilometres (1.9 mi) north of Eketāhuna. It is accessed via Cliff Road, but is now located on private property.

== History ==
=== Early years ===
The crossing of the Makakahi River by the Wellington – Woodville railway in December 1894 enabled the establishment of a station at Newman. The station was initially freight-only, while passenger trains continued to terminate at nearby Eketāhuna as it was the nearest station with passenger accommodations.

After the railway reached Eketāhuna in 1889, local timber merchant Tom Price established a sawmill at Newman, named Albion Mill. At first, the timber was transported by cart to Eketāhuna to be shipped out, but this caused problems with the local council when inclement weather caused his carts to damage the roads. Therefore, when Newman station was established, a siding was laid north of the station to his mill at the township of Newman. Until the mill closed in March 1900, it provided a significant source of traffic for the station. Price's operations were responsible for 1,000,000 cubic metres (35,000,000 cu ft) of totora, rimu, and matai being shipped to his timber yard in Petone.

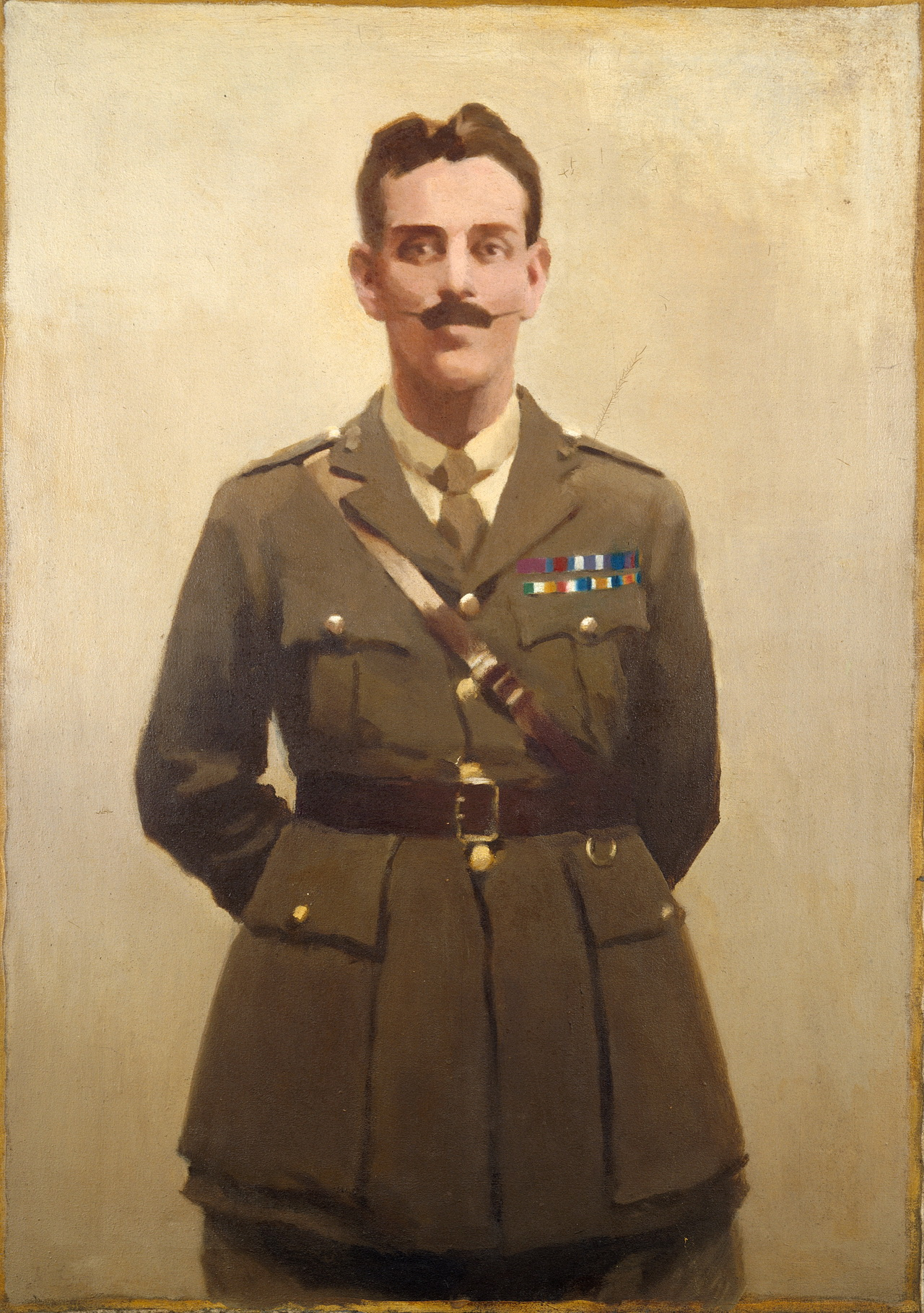
Newman's Captain Alfred Shout VC

=== Nireaha Tramway ===
One of the most significant aspects of Newman's history is its short-lived status as the junction with the Nireaha Tramway from 1895 to 1900. Unlike many other timber tramways of the period, the Nireaha Tramway was constructed to railway standards, with a fully ballasted track and iron rails, and used the national track gauge of 3 ft 6 in (1,067 mm).

Permission was first sought in 1893 to construct the line, and was intended to resolve the problems caused by transporting timber using carts on the roads. Price was fortunate in that an economic depression had caused work on the government Wellington – Woodville railway to stall at Eketāhuna, leading to the availability of a pool of skilled labour. These men were employed by Price to construct and run his tramway. The 11-kilometre (6.8 mi) line started at the Albion Mill and passed by the township of Nireaha before terminating at a sawmill Price had established there on the eastern bank of the Mangatainoka River. This mill was destroyed by fire shortly after commencing operation and was not replaced.

Motive power was initially provided by horses, but later a unique Aveling and Porter steam locomotive was employed. The locomotive was a wood-burner, and was imported from England by Price who had it assembled at Newman. It started service on 2 July 1896, and was driven by a local settler. Following the closure of the mill, the locomotive was relocated to Petone and later sold to mill operators in the King Country where it ended its working life in the 1920s.

By 1900 most of the native timber in the area had been milled, causing Price to close his mill and relocate his plant to Dannevirke. Other millers in Nireaha continued to use the tramway, employing horses for motive power, and Eastern Nireaha children also used the line as a walking track to get to school in Newman.

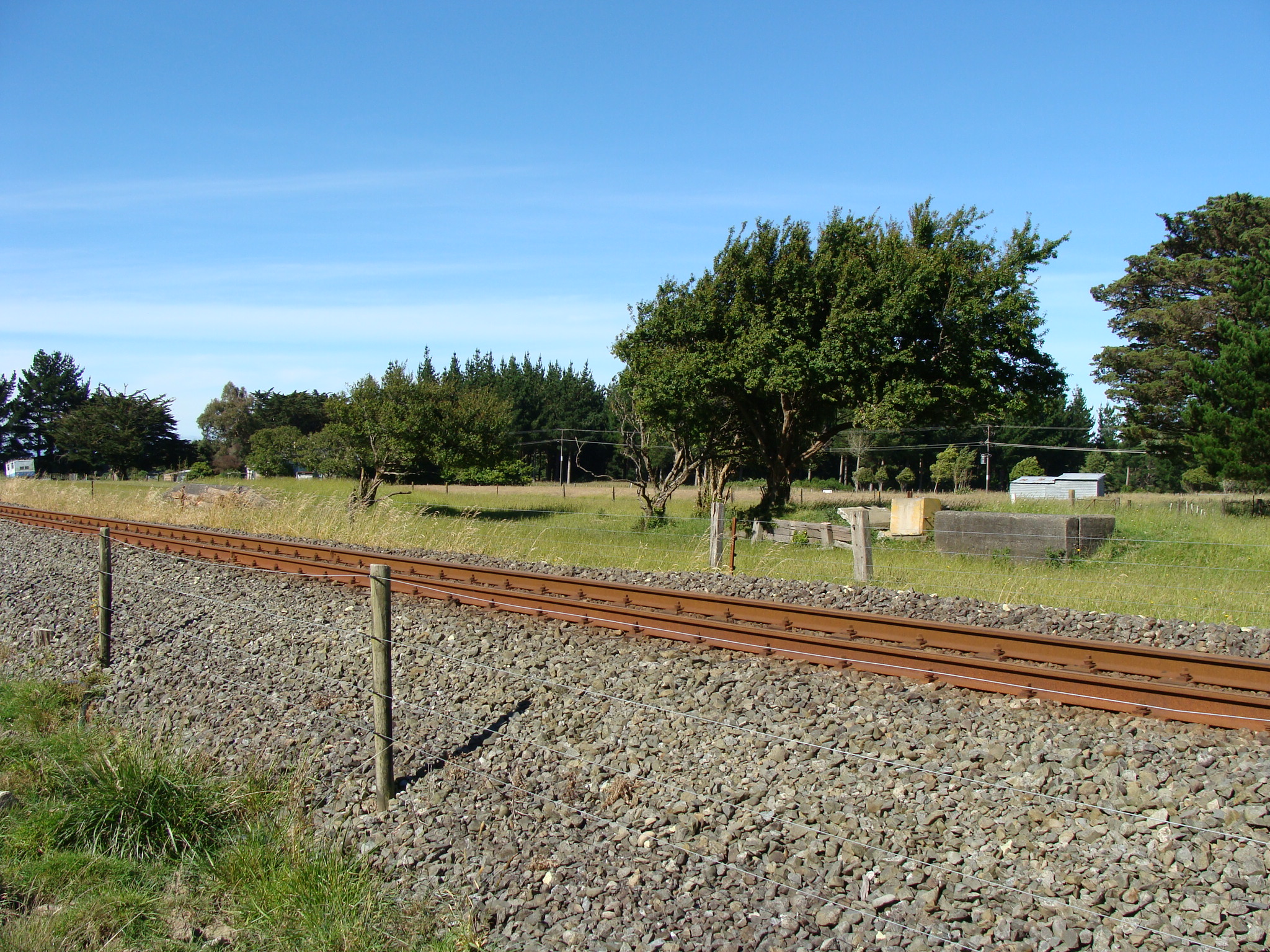
Shown here are the only obvious remnants of the railway history of the site, including the station's loading bank (left).

== Services ==
After completion of the main line to Woodville in 1897, Newman became a stopping place for a variety of locomotive-hauled trains. Later passenger services were provided first by the Wairarapa-class RM railcars, and later, the twinset railcars. The 1959 railcar timetable for the Woodville–Masterton–Wellington and Wellington–Masterton–Woodville routes shows Newman as a "stops if required" station for the 15 services both ways each week.

Railcar services were withdrawn from the Wairarapa Line in the mid-1970s, after which locomotive-hauled carriage trains provided passenger services on the northern section until they were cancelled on 1 August 1988. By this time Newman had been closed to passenger traffic for nearly two decades.

== Today ==
Little can be found at the station site now to indicate what was once located there. The main loading bank and the remains of a building or other loading facility are the only visible remnants.
