= Wairarapa Mail =

Passenger train in New Zealand

The Wairarapa Mail was a passenger train operated by the New Zealand Railways Department (NZR) between Wellington and Woodville, continuing on to Palmerston North as a mixed train. It ran from 1909 until 1948 and its route included the famous and arduous Rimutaka Incline.

== Introduction ==
From the 1897 completion of the Wairarapa Line until 1908, the route through the Wairarapa was NZR's primary means of accessing Wellington as the western line through the Kāpiti Coast and Horowhenua was privately owned by the Wellington and Manawatu Railway Company. The Napier Express passenger train operated from Napier to Wellington via the Wairarapa, but on 7 December 1908, the Wellington and Manawatu Railway was purchased by the government, and in early 1909, the Napier Express was diverted to the quicker western route. Accordingly, the Wairarapa Mail was introduced to provide Wairarapa residents with connections to Wellington, Manawatū, and the Hawkes Bay.

== Operation ==
After the WMR was acquired, most of NZR's long-distance trains used the WMR's Thorndon station as their Wellington terminus. The Wairarapa Mail was the only long-distance train to run out of NZR's Lambton Quay station, which primarily served commuter traffic from the Hutt Valley. Between the Hutt Valley and the Wairarapa, the train had to travel over the Rimutaka Incline over the Rimutaka Range, and at its terminus in Woodville, its carriages were attached to a slow mixed train from Dannevirke that continued through the Manawatū Gorge to terminate in Palmerston North. Passengers could also connect with the northbound Napier Express in Woodville.

The Wairarapa Mail was hauled by a diverse range of motive power. Until World War II, W^{W} class steam locomotives were typical motive power between Wellington and Summit at the western end of the Rimutaka Incline, while H class Fell engines handled the train over the Incline, and from Cross Creek at the eastern end through to Woodville, A class locomotives were normal. Passenger carriages were often older wooden mainline carriages displaced from premier services by new rolling stock; some of these carriages were gas-lit into the 1930s and onwards.

Dramatic changes took place in the later half of the 1930s. In 1936, railcars of the RM class Wairarapa type were introduced on the Wellington to Woodville route, and their ability to run over the Rimutaka Incline at speed allowed a quicker timetable. The railcars became quite popular, but the Mail continued to run daily, and in 1937, Wellington railway station was opened, replacing the Thorndon and Lambton Quay termini and allowing the Mail to operate from the same station as the other mainline expresses. The timetable in 1939 allowed for a 7:50 am departure from Wellington for the northbound service, reaching Masterton at 11:17 am and Woodville at 1:22 pm before progressing on as part of a mixed train to Palmerston North, arriving at 2:53 pm. The southbound service left Woodville at 12:13 pm after the arrival of a mixed that had left Palmerston North at 11:04 am, and it passed through Masterton at 1:59 pm before terminating in Wellington at 5:44 pm. Allowances were made for refreshment stops in Masterton and Woodville as the Mail was never fitted with dining cars.

== Demise ==
The Wairarapa Mail's demise was primarily due to the introduction of the railcars and would have likely come about sooner were it not for the traffic boom associated with World War II. After the war, A^{B} class locomotives were introduced in both the Hutt Valley and Wairarapa and this modernised the train, but coal shortages in 1944 had led to the service's reduction to running thrice weekly. From this point, the railcars came to be dominant and they fully replaced the Mail in 1948.

== After the Wairarapa Mail ==
Despite the Mail's demise, carriage trains were sometimes operated to cater for demand at holiday times, as the railcars could not run in multiple and there were only six of them. In 1955, the Rimutaka Tunnel was opened, eliminating the Incline, and by December 1963, peak hour passenger demand exceeded the capacity of the 88 seater railcars that had taken over from the Wairarapa railcars. Accordingly, a permanent carriage train was re-introduced, from 16 December 1963, to the Wairarapa; this service was the forerunner to the still-operational Wairarapa Connection. An additional morning peak service was added in 1971, still using an 88-seat railcar. This service was in turn, replaced by a passenger train in 1976. As the 88 seat railcars wore out, they were rebuilt as AC class carriages. These were used on the still running Wellington-Masterton-Palmerston North service from 1978 until 1982, when they, in turn, were replaced with ordinary carriages. The service, which was the last vestige of the Wairarapa Mail, ceased running in 1988.

== Bibliography ==
- Churchman, Geoffrey B; Hurst, Tony (2001) [1990, 1991]. The Railways of New Zealand: A Journey through History (Second ed.). Transpress New Zealand. ISBN 0-908876-20-3.
- Mahoney, J. D. (1987) [1982]. Kings of the Iron Road: Steam Passenger Trains of New Zealand. Palmerston North: Dunmore Press. ISBN 0-908564-90-2.
