= Napier Express =

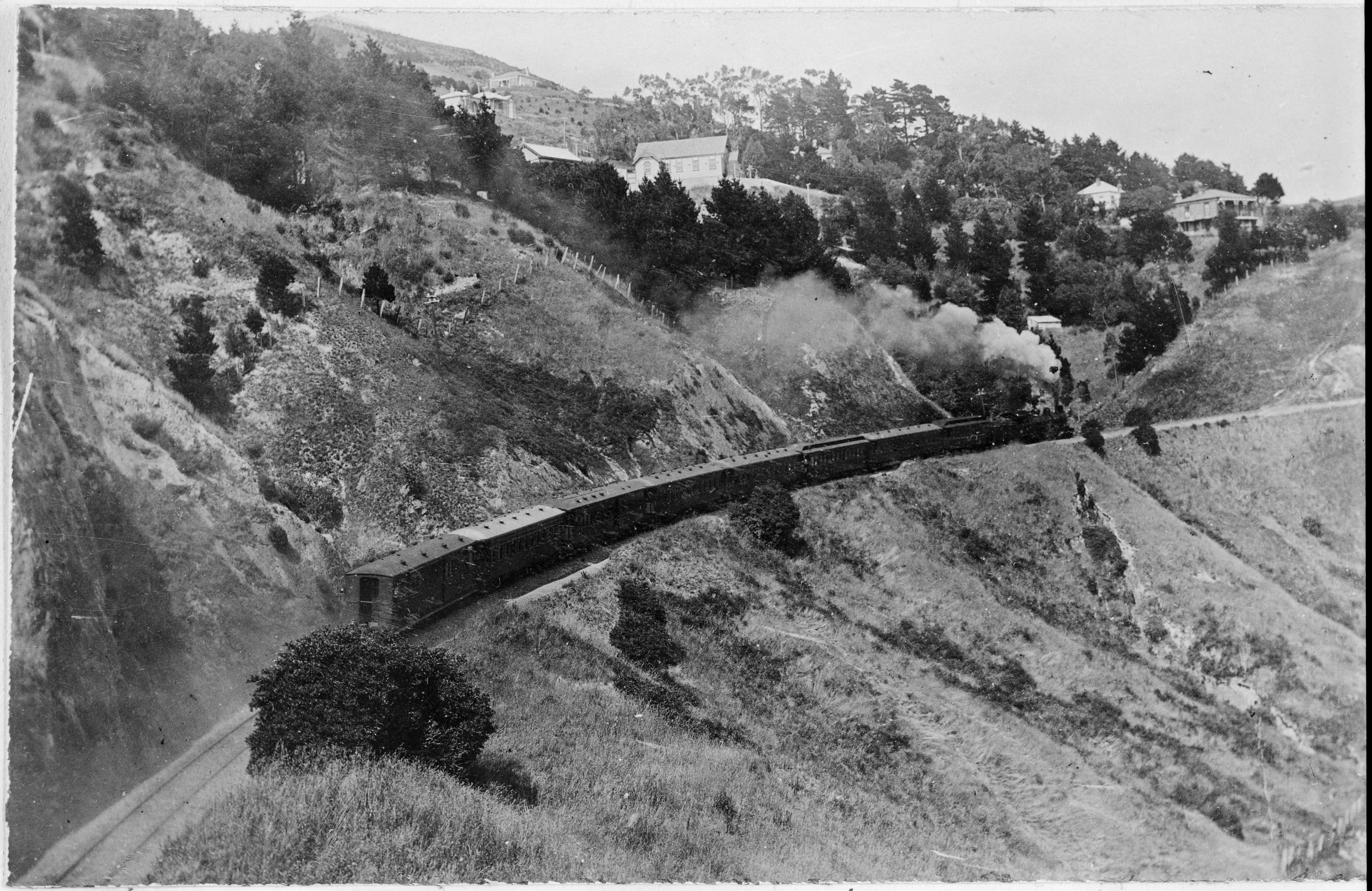
Napier Express nearing Ngaio, New Zealand on January 1, 1911, photo by Albert Percy Godber

The Napier Express was a passenger express train operated by the New Zealand Railways Department initially between Napier and Palmerston North and later between Napier and Wellington. It ran from 1891 until 1954.

== Introduction ==
On 13 October 1874, the first section of the Palmerston North - Gisborne Line opened between Napier and Hastings. Over the following 17 years the line steadily extended into the Hawkes Bay interior, and on 9 March 1891 it opened through the Manawatū Gorge to Palmerston North. Construction of the Wairarapa Line from Wellington was steadily advancing towards its junction with the Palmerston North - Gisborne Line at Woodville, at the eastern, Hawkes Bay, end of the Manawatū Gorge, but the only rail access to Wellington at the time was via the Wellington and Manawatu Railway Company's line (WMR) up the west coast between Wellington and Longburn, just south of Palmerston North. The Railways Department introduced the Napier Express as a dedicated passenger service between Napier and Palmerston North, with connections to the WMR for passengers to Horowhenua, the Kāpiti Coast, and Wellington. This was a significant upgrade for passengers on the Napier line, as services had previously just been slow mixed trains, carrying both passengers and freight.

== Operation ==
The Napier Express commenced just after the railway opened to Palmerston North in 1891 and ran once each way daily, typically hauled by a J class steam locomotive. Despite its 'express' name and superiority over mixed services, it was quite slow by modern standards. The southbound service left Napier at 10.45am and the WMR connection arrived in Wellington at 9.50pm. Today the same journey takes less than half the time.

The service was soon to take longer, although the need to change trains was eliminated. On 11 December 1897 the Wairarapa Line reached Woodville, creating a Railways Department line between Wellington and Napier. The Napier Express then was diverted from Palmerston North, running to Wellington via the Wairarapa. This route included the Rimutaka Incline, which caused the journey time to increase by an hour, a move unpopular with passengers. Two Rogers K class locomotives were transferred from the South Island to operate the trains, and in 1899 they were joined by two more South Island locomotives, of the N class, allowing the timetable to be accelerated to 10.5 hours. N class engines were sometimes assisted by M class tank locomotives, and this combination was referred to as the 'en and chicken.

In 1908, the WMR was purchased by the government and incorporated into the national network. In 1909 the Napier Express was diverted from the Wairarapa Line, through the Manawatū Gorge to Palmerston North, and then to Wellington over the former WMR track. resulting in a substantial improvement in running time.

On 20 February 1911 when the express was approaching Paekākāriki from the south, a large boulder dislodged from above on the Paekakariki Escarpment rolled down onto a second class carriage, killing Miss Alice Power (23y) from Greymouth who was travelling with two friends.

By 1914 the travel time was 9 hours 4 minutes with track improvements in 1914 which allowed the speed limit in some places to be raised to 73 km/h and the more powerful A class locomotives was introduced about 1917-18. By 1925, it was down to 7 hours 31 minutes, partly due to the new A^{B} class locomotives, and a further improvement in 1939 was 7 hours 17 minutes when the Tawa Flat Deviation eliminated the torturous, winding route via Johnsonville into Wellington and the K class began operating the expresses. By 1949 the travel time between Wellington and Napier was seven hours.

== Replacement ==
The Railways Department had been experimenting with railcars for provincial and rural services since 1912, and in the 1930s they started to become successful. In the 1940s they proved popular on other Hawkes Bay services, and due to their greater efficiency and lower running costs the Railways Department began considering replacing the Napier Express with a railcar service. In 1954, due to a severe shortage of crews, and coal, the Express was withdrawn just days before Christmas, and replaced by an RM class Standard railcar service. The railcars were a considerable improvement over the Express, operating twice daily in each direction and covering the journey in just 5.5 hours. The Standard railcars were augmented and replaced by the new, higher capacity RM 88-seater railcars the following year. Carriage expresses returned to the route in 1972 with the introduction of the Endeavour, which was replaced by the Bay Express in 1989. When the Australian company West Coast Railways took over passenger services in 2002, this was one of the services that was withdrawn before sale.
