= Manawatū Gorge =

Gorge in New Zealand

Coordinates: 40.3184°S 175.7980°E

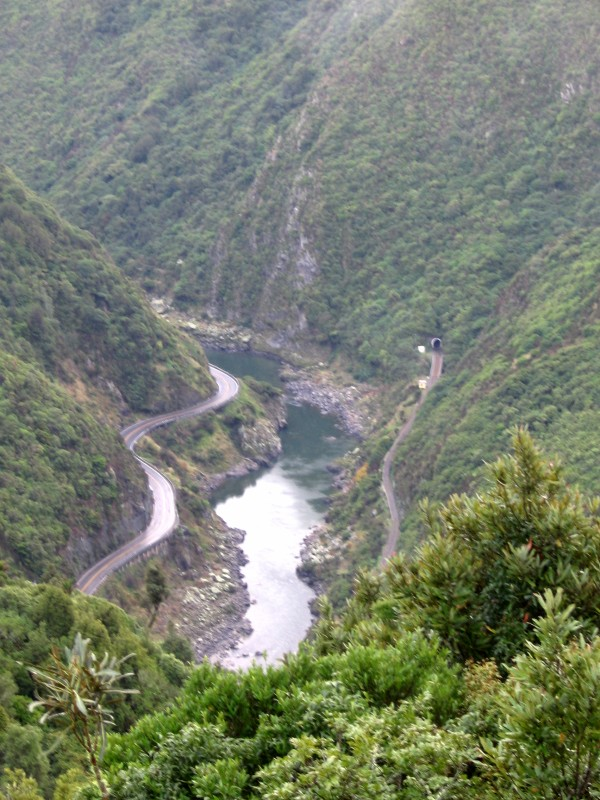
Manawatū Gorge viewed from a lookout on the Manawatu Gorge Track

The Manawatū Gorge (Māori: Te Āpiti) is a steep-sided gorge formed by the Manawatū River in the North Island of New Zealand. At 6 km (3.7 mi) long, the Manawatū Gorge divides the Ruahine and Tararua Ranges, linking the Manawatū and Tararua Districts. It lies to the northeast of Palmerston North. Its western end is near the small town of Ashhurst and its eastern end is close to the town of Woodville.

As one of the few links between the eastern and western North Island, the gorge is an important transport link, with the Palmerston North–Napier Line passing through the gorge, as well as State Highway 3 until 2017. Recreationally, the gorge is part of the Manawatū Gorge Scenic Reserve, with various walking tracks through the surrounding native bush.

Whātonga, a Māori explorer from the Kurahaupō canoe, is said to have found the gorge in about the 12th century. Europeans began to use the Manawatū Gorge around the 1840s; in 1842 Bishop George Augustus Selwyn and Chief Justice William Martin passed through the gorge to reach the Wairarapa.

== Etymology ==
The Manawatū Gorge takes its name from the river which cuts through it, the Manawatū River. The river's name, which means 'heart standing still', is derived from the words manawa, meaning heart, and tū, meaning coming to a halt. The name refers to Haunui-a-nanaia saying the phrase when he caught sight of the river in his search for his wife Wairaka.

Te Āpiti, the Māori name for the gorge, is usually translated as 'the narrowing' or 'the narrow passage'. The gorge was also sometimes called Te Au-rere-a-te-tonga.

== Geography ==
The Manawatu Gorge is significant because, unlike most gorges, the Manawatū River is a water gap, that is it runs directly through the surrounding ranges from one side to the other. This was caused by the ranges moving upwards at the same time as the gorge was eroded by the river, instead of the more usual erosion of an already existing range.

The Manawatū River is the only river in New Zealand that starts its journey in the Tararua District on one side of the main divide, and finishes it on the other side near Foxton in the Tasman Sea.

== Transport ==
The route of the current highway (Te Ahu a Turanga – Manawatū Tararua Highway), opened in June 2025. The previous route (Saddle Road) is visible to the north of the new road.

From 1872 until 2017, State Highway 3 went through the Manawatu Gorge on the south side of the river. In June 2025, it was replaced by Te Ahu a Turanga, a new highway across the hills to the north of the gorge.

Before its closure in 2017, the road through the gorge was the primary link between the two sides of the lower North Island. Other than Saddle Road and the Pahiatua Track, both narrow winding local roads a few kilometers north and south of the Manawatu Gorge, the gorge was the only east-west road connection between the Akatarawa Valley, 100 kilometres (62 mi) to the south, and SH5 between Taupo and Napier 150 kilometres (93 mi) to the north. It was frequently blocked by landslides, and eventually abandoned.

The railway from Palmerston North to Napier traverses the Gorge as a single track on the northern side. It is mainly used by goods trains, with no scheduled passenger rail services. Occasional railway excursions, typically with steam trains, make use of the scenic Manawatu Gorge Railway line with its two tunnels and several small bridges.

The Old Gorge Cemetery lies on the north side of the Manawatu Gorge. Public access is available, but the cemetery was closed many years ago to further burials. The road is located just a few kilometres out of Woodville on the north side of the gorge.

=== Landslides ===
The gorge was closed for 75 days after flooding in 2005, and again after several massive landslips in 2011. Even after its reopening in August 2012, sections were limited to one lane.

In October 2012 the gorge road was closed while large rocks that threatened traffic were destroyed. Restoration was completed in November 2012.

Slips triggered by severe weather blocked State Highway 3 again for a month in April 2015.

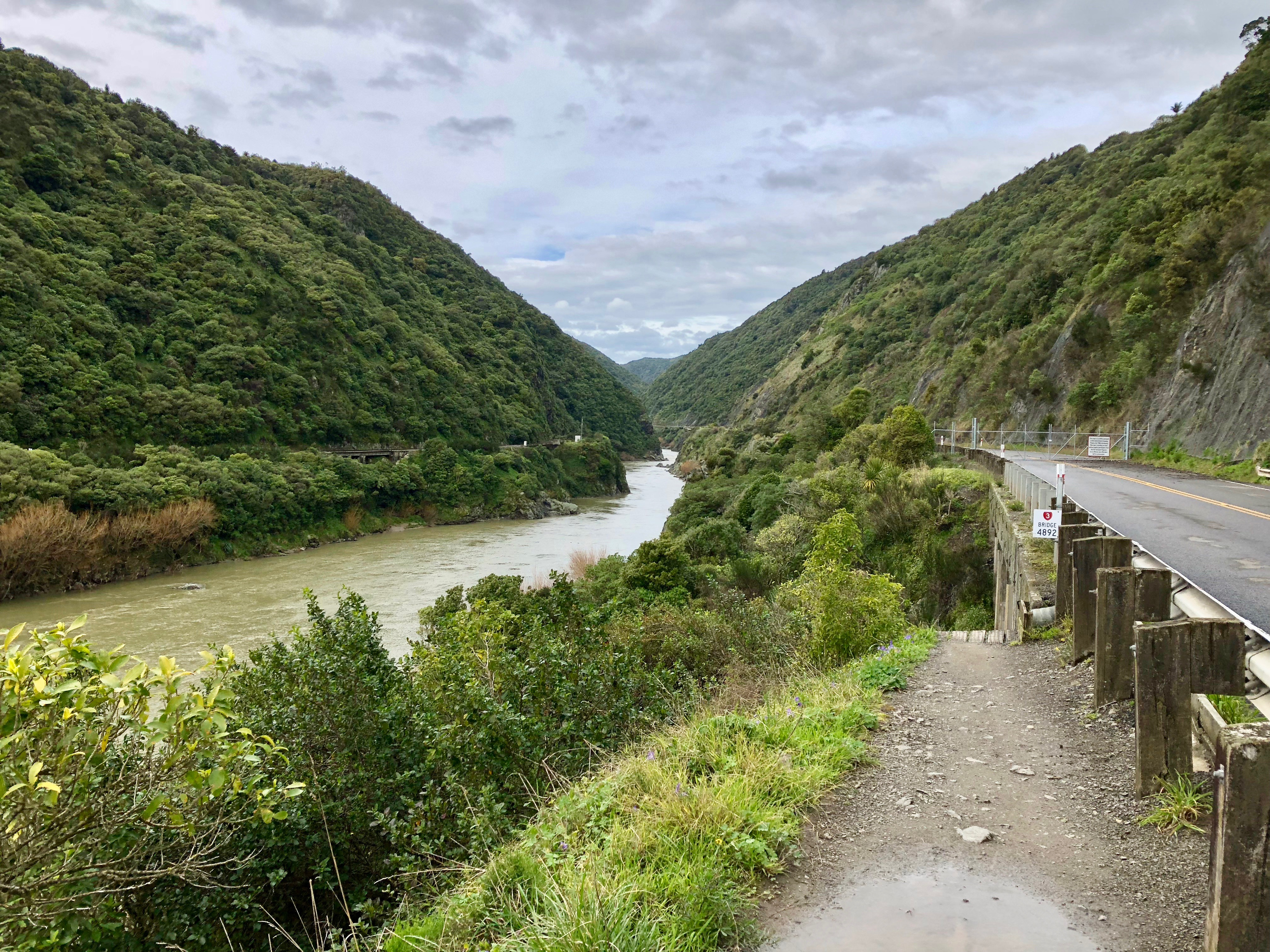
The sign says the road is closed to all, including pedestrians, under the Government Roading Powers Act 1989. The Manawatu Gorge Track goes under the bridge

In April 2017, the Manawatu Gorge was closed once again by a large slip. Contractors were pulled out of clearing the slip in July 2017 due to ongoing geological movement in the hill, closing the road indefinitely.

A further slip in July 2017 at the Ashhurst end of the Manawatu Gorge left an additional 10,000 cubic metres of rock on the road. Waka Kotahi NZ Transport Agency decided to close the Gorge route permanently as it was deemed unreliable . The authority investigated long-term options to bypass or replace the gorge route, with their final list having four options.

The replacement route opened in June 2025 is between the Gorge and the Saddle Road, bypassing Ashurst.

== Manawatu Gorge Track ==
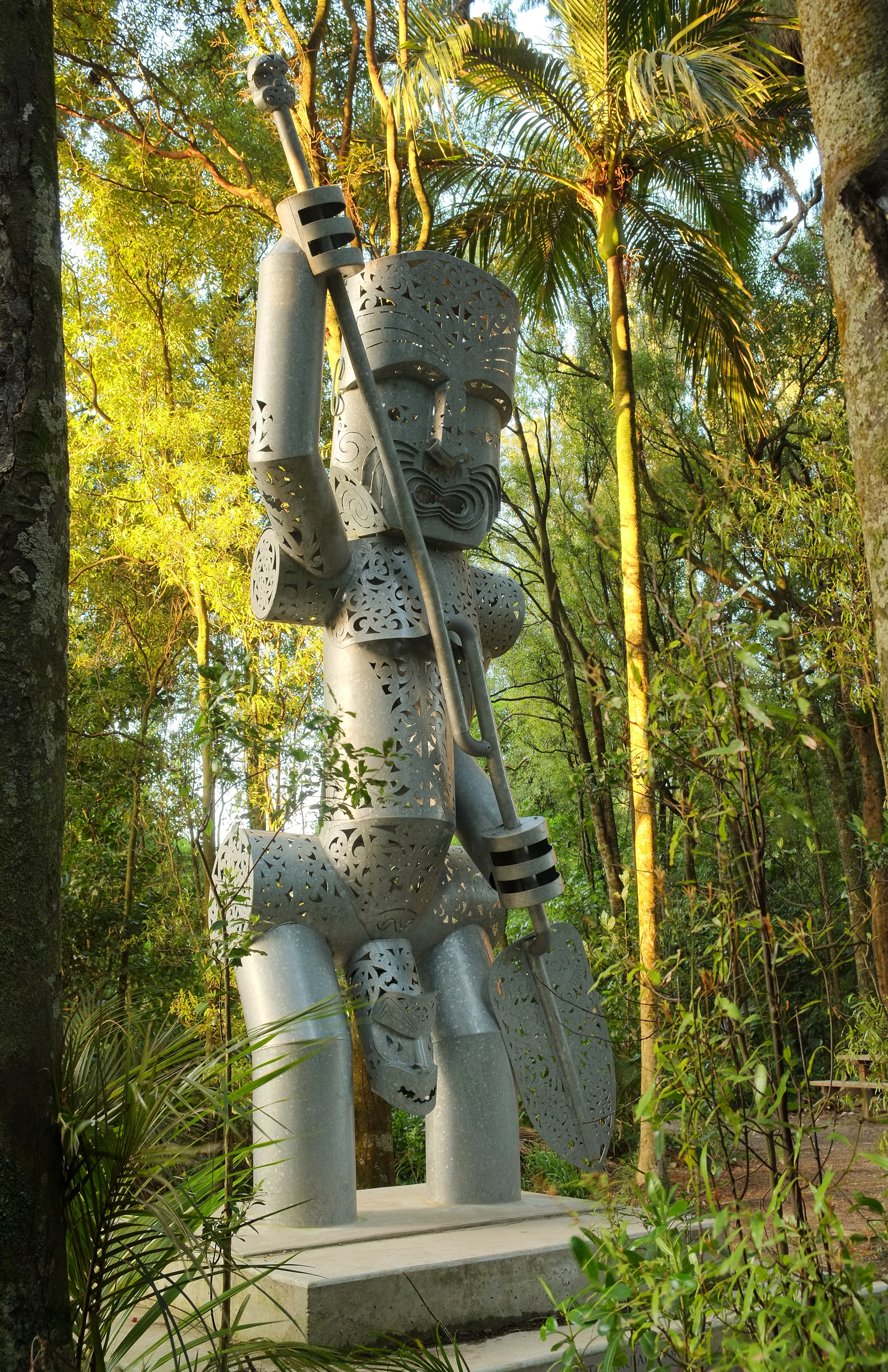
Whatonga sculpture along Manawatu Gorge Track

A 10 kilometres (6.2 mi) tramping track, the Manawatu Gorge Track, runs parallel to the gorge on the south side through native bush.

The walking track passes several lookout points, one of which is above the site of the 2015 landslide, aptly called the "Big Slip Lookout". The majority of the track leads through native bush, with the lookouts offering views overlooking the gorge and towards the Te Āpiti Wind Farm continuing on the hills north of the gorge.

Also along the track, in the midst of native bush, stands the 6 metres (20 ft) tall metal sculpture of Whatonga, one of three recognised Māori chiefs on board the Kurahaupo Waka, which journeyed across the ocean to New Zealand. The statue was funded by the Manawatu Gorge Biodiversity stakeholder group and is made of steel. It was lowered to its location in the bush by helicopter, and blessed at a dawn ceremony on 11 April 2014. The artwork on the sculpture features hammerhead shark patterns and depicts elements of the story of Whatonga's sea voyage, as well as emblems of all of the Manawatu Gorge biodiversity project stakeholders.

Up to date information on all walking and biking tracks is available on the Te Āpiti website.
