= Dalefield railway station =

Defunct railway station in New Zealand

Dalefield
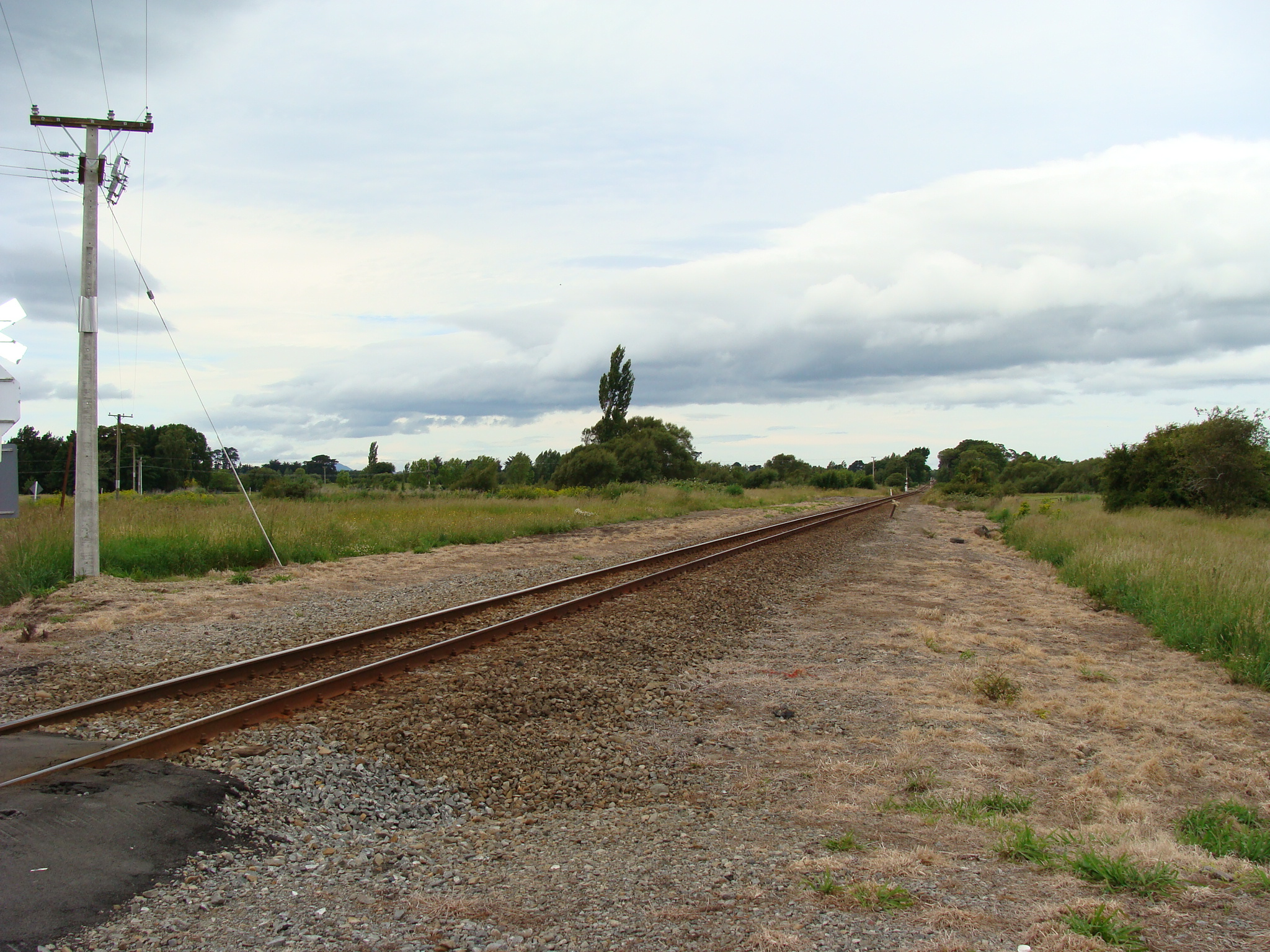
- Dalefield railway station yard, looking north towards Carterton in 2009.

General information
- Location: Hodders Road, Carterton, New Zealand
- Coordinates: 41°2′12.05″S 175°29′26.08″E
- System: New Zealand Government Railways (NZGR) regional rail
- Owner: Railways Department
- Line: Wairarapa Line
- Platforms: Single side
- Tracks: Main (x1); Loop siding (x1)

History
- Opened: 1 November 1880
- Closed: 1 February 1981
- Former names: Arnold's Line
Location
Notes
- Previous Station: Matarawa Station; Next Station: Carterton Station

Dalefield railway station was a station on the Wairarapa Line that served the small rural community of Dalefield, just south of Carterton in the Wairarapa region of New Zealand’s North Island. It survived for just over a century from when the line opened in 1880 until it was closed in 1981.

== History ==
=== Facilities ===
Like most of the Wairarapa stations as far north as Masterton, Dalefield opened along with the line between Woodside and Masterton on 1 November 1880. Several months after the opening of the Greytown Branch in May 1880, a shelter shed had been constructed at Dalefield which, along with a short loop siding, comprised the few amenities that were provided there.

Concerns about the possibility of stock straying along the line, brought about by the recent decking of the bridge south of the station yard in 1910 for shunting purposes, led to a request for the original road alignment through the station, which had earlier been moved north in 1895, to be restored. As the road crossed both the main line and the loop siding, access through the station yard on the road was controlled by station gates which were frequently being left open, making it possible for stock to escape. Various remedies were suggested and in 1912 the Wairarapa South County Council submitted a proposal to the Railways Department which called for the loop siding to be shortened and cattle stops to be installed so passage along the road could be permitted without the need for gates.

A meeting between the council and the department was arranged to discuss possible modifications. The council expressed its concern about the existing road crossing which, for example, caused problems when wagons were left in the siding thus blocking access through the yard. As objections had been raised over the idea of shortening the loop it was suggested that the loop instead be extended northwards which would also require the moving of the platform and shelter north also.

Local settlers also met with the Railways Department in 1912 and expressed their concerns about access to the platform. Outward consignments, such as cheese, had to be carried across the siding to the platform and inward goods had to be similarly transferred from the platform to carts. A request was made for the construction of a cart dock and an approach road to the back of the platform, on the eastern side of the main line. This request was later approved on 27 November 1912.

By 1914 none of the proposed improvements had been made as a decision on whether or not to move the station northwards was still pending. It was finally decided to not proceed with moving the station northwards and a request for the construction of the approach road and cart dock was put in hand. Only two years later, in conjunction with the council, the Railways Department embarked on a reorganisation of the station yard including modification of the loop siding and moving the platform and station building.

The construction of a loading bank was requested in 1930 when local farmers complained that their previous requests for improved loading facilities had been ignored and that the requirement for them to drive their stock to the nearest such facilities at Carterton was unreasonable. A local racing enthusiast also pointed out that a loading bank at Dalefield would be most useful to him in his business of training race horses. A loading bank the length of a single wagon was thought sufficient to meet requirements. Approval for the construction of the loading bank was given on 28 April 1930 and it was noted that completion was required in time for the upcoming Winter Show in Wellington and the Carterton Show. The loading bank was built with a timber front, ramped at both ends to a grade of 1 in 5, to a height of 2 feet 10 inches (0.86 m) and 20 feet (6.1 m) long, and was completed on 29 May 1930.

The turnouts for the loop siding came due for renewal in 1959 and it was suggested that perhaps the siding should be closed altogether. It was noted that the dairy company, which had been the main user of the siding, was planning to switch production to casein which would only require irregular shipments. The District Traffic Manager advised that the traffic for the siding was still such that the siding could not be closed and it was therefore decided to proceed with the renewal of the turnouts.

=== Operations ===
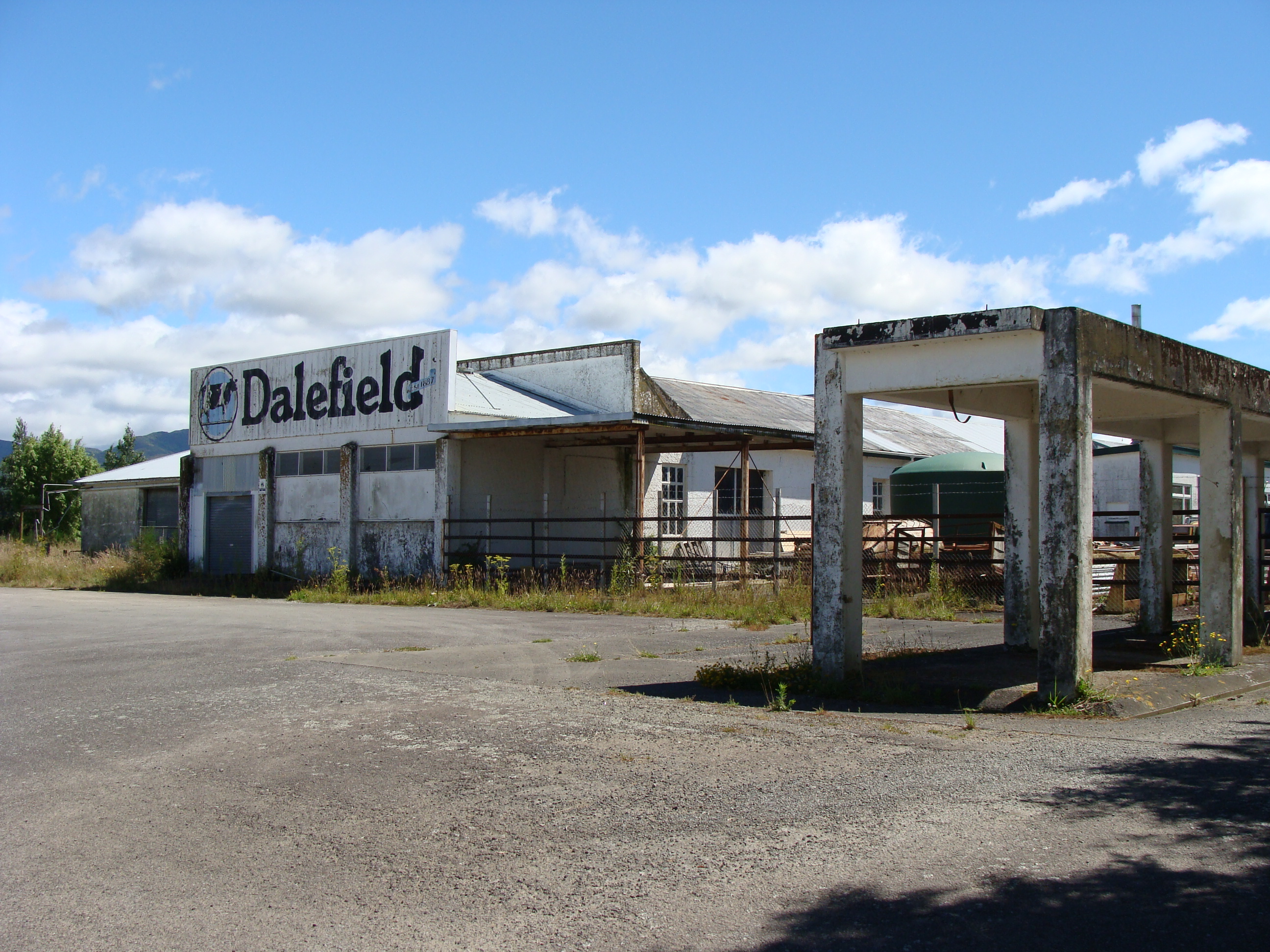
Dalefield dairy factory.

Dalefield was always considered to be a small station but at various times throughout its history served significant customers or sources of traffic such as an early sawmill in the vicinity and the nearby dairy factory. Trains were also crossed there in the days before signalling arrangements were standardised but this practice was discontinued when more modern signal systems were introduced at the larger stations.

Services through Dalefield started with two return weekday mixed trains, an arrangement that lasted many decades. No regular passenger-only workings were provided save for the occasional holiday excursion trains. As was typically the case for flag stations, trains only stopped to pick up or set down passengers and wagons if required to do so.

The Wairarapa Line was completed to its northern terminus at Woodville in 1897 and this enabled the Railways Department to introduce the Napier Mail to the Wairarapa Line. This train had earlier run as the Napier Express via the Wellington and Manawatu Railway and the Manawatū Gorge. This arrangement lasted until 1909 when the Napier Mail once again became the Napier Express and reverted to its original route. Thereafter the primary passenger service through the Wairarapa was the Wairarapa Mail which was essentially the Wellington to Woodville portion of the old Napier Mail.

From 1936 when the NZR RM class Wairarapa-type railcars were introduced passengers from Dalefield had a much faster service to points both north and south. The Wairarapa Mail passenger trains continued to run but in 1944 were reduced from their Monday – Saturday timetable to a thrice weekly service due to a severe coal shortage. It never recovered from this and was withdrawn completely in 1948. Several years later the Rimutaka Tunnel was opened, bringing an end to the mixed trains that had been plying the Wairarapa Line and the withdrawal of the Wairarapa-type railcars, and ushering in the era of the twin-set railcars. The 1959 railcar timetable lists Dalefield as a "stops if required" station for both northbound and southbound services.

The station remained open to both passenger and freight traffic until its closure on 1 February 1981.

== Extant remains ==
Nothing remains of the station's facilities at the site. The station building, platform, loading bank, and siding have all been removed.
