= Middleton railway station, Wellington Region =

Defunct railway station in New Zealand

Middleton

General information
- Location: Wiltons Road, Carterton, New Zealand
- Coordinates: 40°58′44.94″S 175°34′54.15″E
- System: New Zealand Government Railways (NZGR) regional rail
- Owner: Railways Department
- Line: Wairarapa Line
- Platforms: Single side
- Tracks: Main (x1)

History
- Opened: 1 November 1880; 8 February 1881 (freight)
- Closed: April 1891
Location
Notes
- Previous Station: Clareville Station; Next Station: Waingawa Station

Middleton railway station was a short-lived rural flag station in the Wairarapa region of New Zealand’s North Island. It was located on the Wairarapa Line between the stations of Clareville (to the south) and Waingawa (to the north) near what was known as West Taratahi Road (now Wiltons Road). It opened in 1880 but was closed just over a decade later in 1891.

== History ==
Following the opening of the Greytown Branch in May 1880, construction of the line northwards steadily progressed towards Masterton. The first train was able to cross the Waingawa River in late July and a station had been erected at Middleton by the end of August. The station opened to all traffic along with the Woodside – Masterton section of the line on 1 November 1880.

Facilities at Middleton were few and consisted of a platform and passenger shelter. The Working Timetable also lists a loading bank and up to two private sidings were also listed though not after 1884.

Freight traffic didn't officially begin until 1881 by which time the station had been receiving passenger trains for several months. The station was last listed in the October 1889 Working Timetable and was closed to all traffic from 1 July 1891. See NZR notice of 3 June 1881

The station was located in between the rural settlements of East and West Taratahi. However, the station does not seem to ever have been referred to as Taratahi; it was instead Waingawa which bore the name Taratahi until 1921. There is some evidence to the contrary however, such as a modern list of Wairarapa stations that lists a Taratahi station 1.23 km south of Middleton that had been closed.
