= Clareville railway station =

Railway station in New Zealand

Clareville
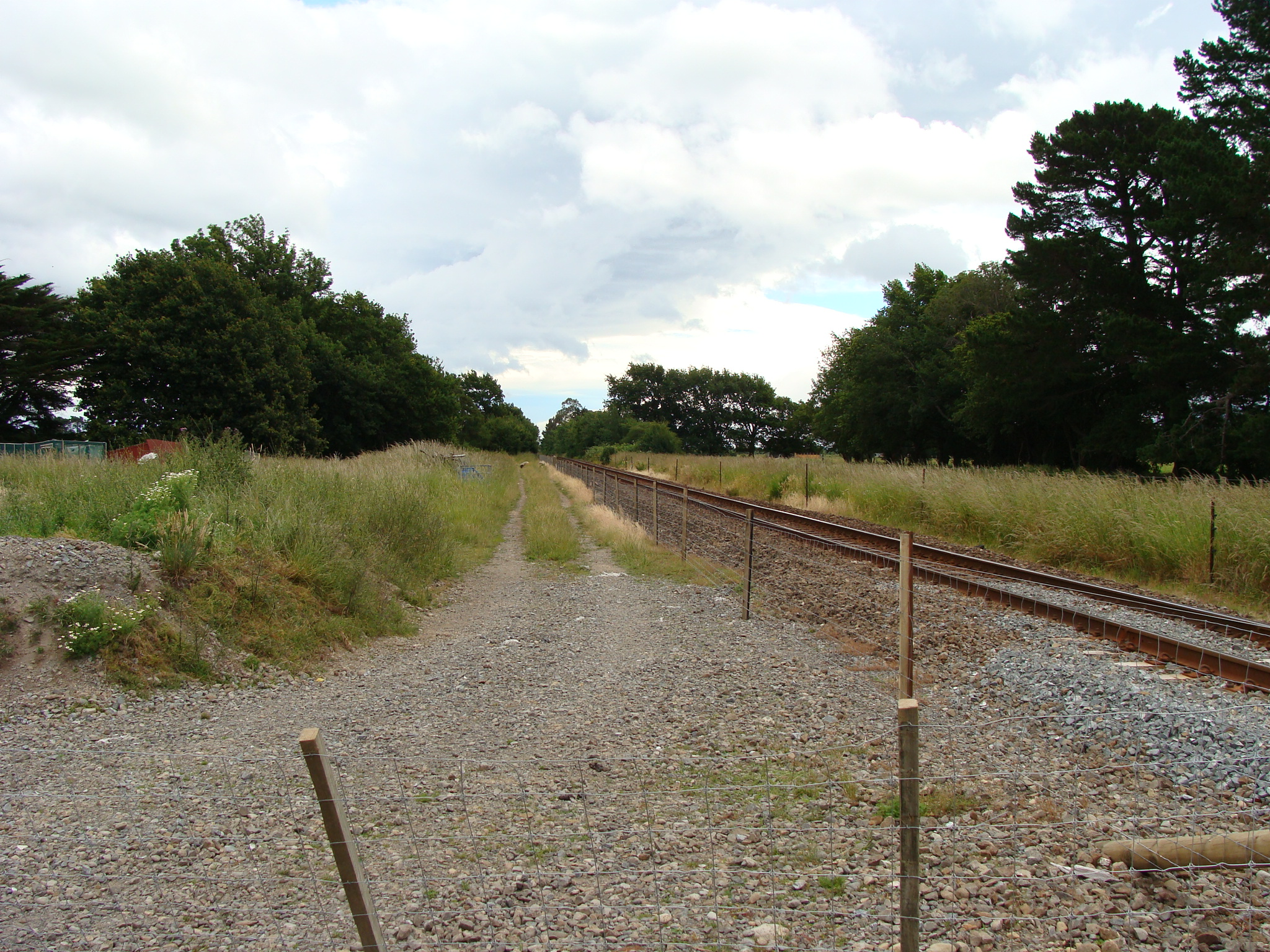
- Clareville Station site in 2009.

General information
- Location: 48 Chester Road, Clareville, New Zealand
- Coordinates: 41°0′16.51″S 175°32′48.35″E
- System: New Zealand Government Railways (NZGR) regional rail
- Owner: Railways Department
- Line: Wairarapa Line
- Platforms: Single side
- Tracks: Main (x1); Loop siding (x1)

History
- Opened: 1 November 1880
- Closed: 16 September 1956 (freight); 30 November 1970 (passengers)
Clareville yard layout
Location
Notes
- Previous Station: Carterton Station; Next Station: Middleton Station

Clareville railway station was a flag station serving the small settlement of Clareville, north of Carterton in the Wairarapa region of New Zealand's North Island. It survived for nine decades from when it opened in 1880 until closure to all traffic in 1970.

== History ==
=== Facilities ===
Following the opening of the Greytown Branch in May 1880, construction of the line northwards steadily progressed towards Masterton. The first train was able to cross the Waingawa River in late July and due to a donation of 2 acres of land by Donald and Frances Nicolson a shelter was able to be erected at Clareville by the end of August. The station opened to all traffic along with the Woodside – Masterton section of the line on 1 November 1880.

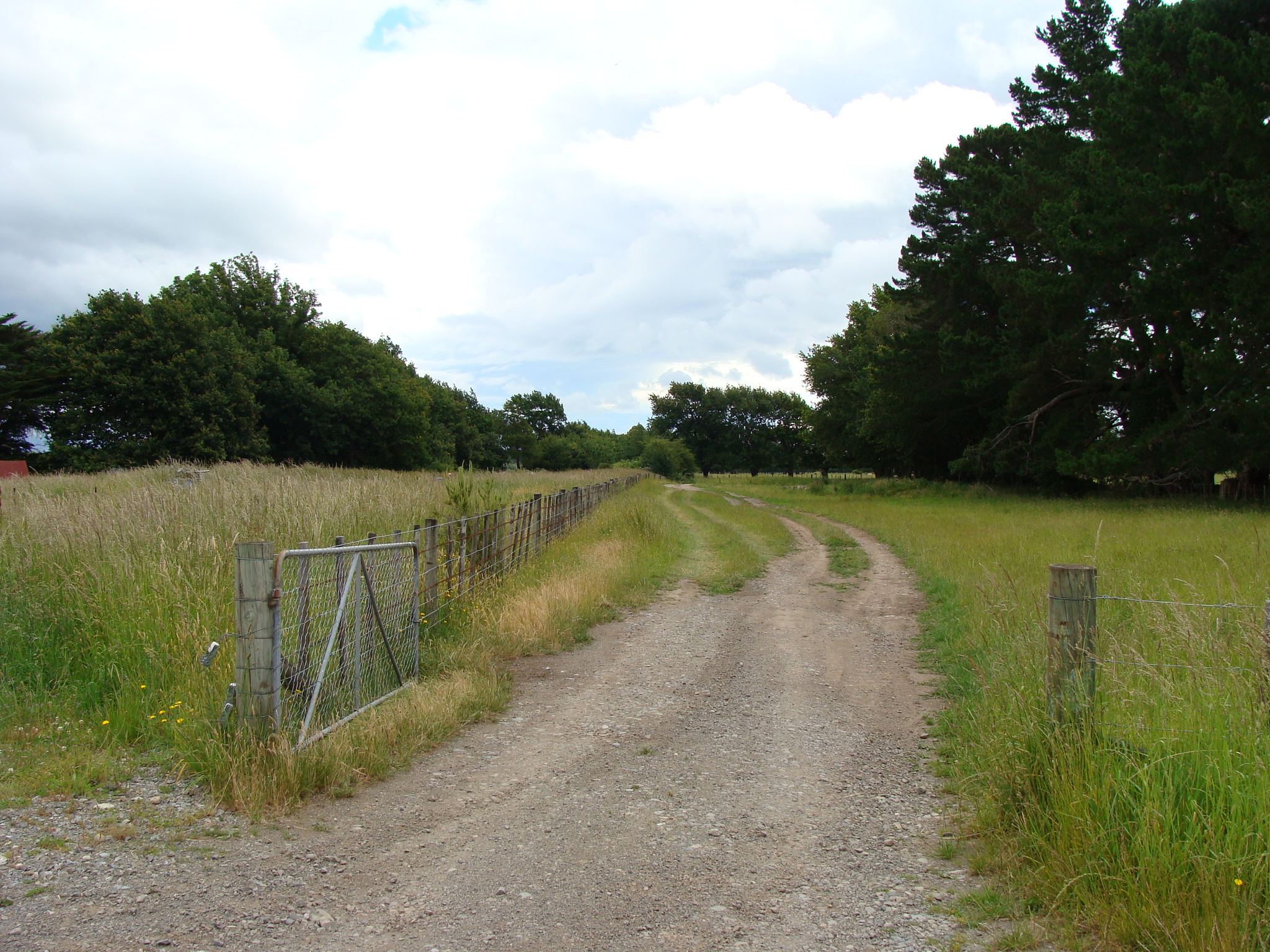
Former access road to the loading bank.

In addition to the shelter shed there was also a loop siding with a capacity of 19 wagons and a loading siding that was used by William Booth's timber mill. The mill, which was located between Carterton and Clareville, later established its own private siding in 1885.

The loading bank was extended to a length of 100 feet (30 m) in 1924 to enable the loading and discharging of race horses. The extra capacity was required to serve up to six 4-wheel horseboxes. The work order noted that the extension should be ready by 15 October 1924 in preparation for use for race traffic on 18 October; work was completed on 4 October.

The Taratahi Dairy Company complained in April 1925 that it, and others, had experienced difficulty in delivering cans of cream to the station. The provision of a cart dock was requested which was duly authorised by the District Engineer. It was constructed at the south end of the station and the District Engineer was advised that work had been completed on 30 June 1925.

=== Services ===
Services through Clareville started with two return weekday mixed trains, an arrangement that lasted many decades. No regular passenger-only workings were provided save for the occasional holiday excursion trains. As was typically the case for flag stations, trains only stopped to pick up or set down passengers and wagons if required to do so.

The Wairarapa Line was completed to its northern terminus at Woodville in 1897 and this enabled the Railways Department to introduce the Napier Mail to the Wairarapa Line. This train had earlier run as the Napier Express via the Wellington and Manawatu Railway and the Manawatū Gorge. This arrangement lasted until 1909 when the Napier Mail once again became the Napier Express and reverted to its original route. Thereafter the primary passenger service through the Wairarapa was the Wairarapa Mail which was essentially the Wellington to Woodville portion of the old Napier Mail.

From 1936 when the NZR RM class Wairarapa-type railcars were introduced passengers from Clareville had a much faster service to points both north and south. The Wairarapa Mail passenger trains continued to run but in 1944 were reduced from their Monday – Saturday timetable to a thrice weekly service due to a severe coal shortage. It never recovered from this and was withdrawn completely in 1948. Several years later the Rimutaka Tunnel was opened, bringing an end to the mixed trains that had been plying the Wairarapa Line and the withdrawal of the Wairarapa-type railcars, and ushering in the era of the twin-set railcars. The 1959 railcar timetable lists Clareville as a "stops if required" station for both northbound and southbound services.

In a review of sidings at unattended stations in 1953 it was noted of Clareville that inward goods comprised approximately 12 wagons of coal and 6 wagons of shooks for the Carrington Dairy Company, who consigned their outward goods at Carterton. Outward goods consisted primarily of hay and straw, amounting to approximately 12 wagons per year. It was considered that only minor inconvenience would be caused in closing Clareville to goods traffic and instead handling it at Carterton. In response to the review the District Engineer stated he had no objection to the lifting of the goods siding at Clareville. After the possibility of new business at Clareville from Airlift (N.Z.) was aborted on 11 June 1956, closure of the station to goods traffic was confirmed and a request to lift the goods siding was put in hand on 20 November 1957 with work being completed by 1 March 1958.

=== Miscellaneous ===
A narrow escape from a serious accident occurred in 1898 when a buggy containing two ladies was drawn beside the line waiting for the Napier-Wellington express. The horse became frightened at the approach of the train and plunged blindly into the engine. The horse was knocked down but was uninjured. The buggy was left broken however the occupants also escaped unhurt.

== Today ==
Nothing remains at the former site of the Clareville station. The shelter shed was removed when the station closed in 1970 and all private sidings in the vicinity have also since been closed.

The station building was persevered at a private home in Masterton, has since been moved in November 2017 to Carterton railway station.
