= Waingawa railway station =

Railway station in New Zealand

Waingawa
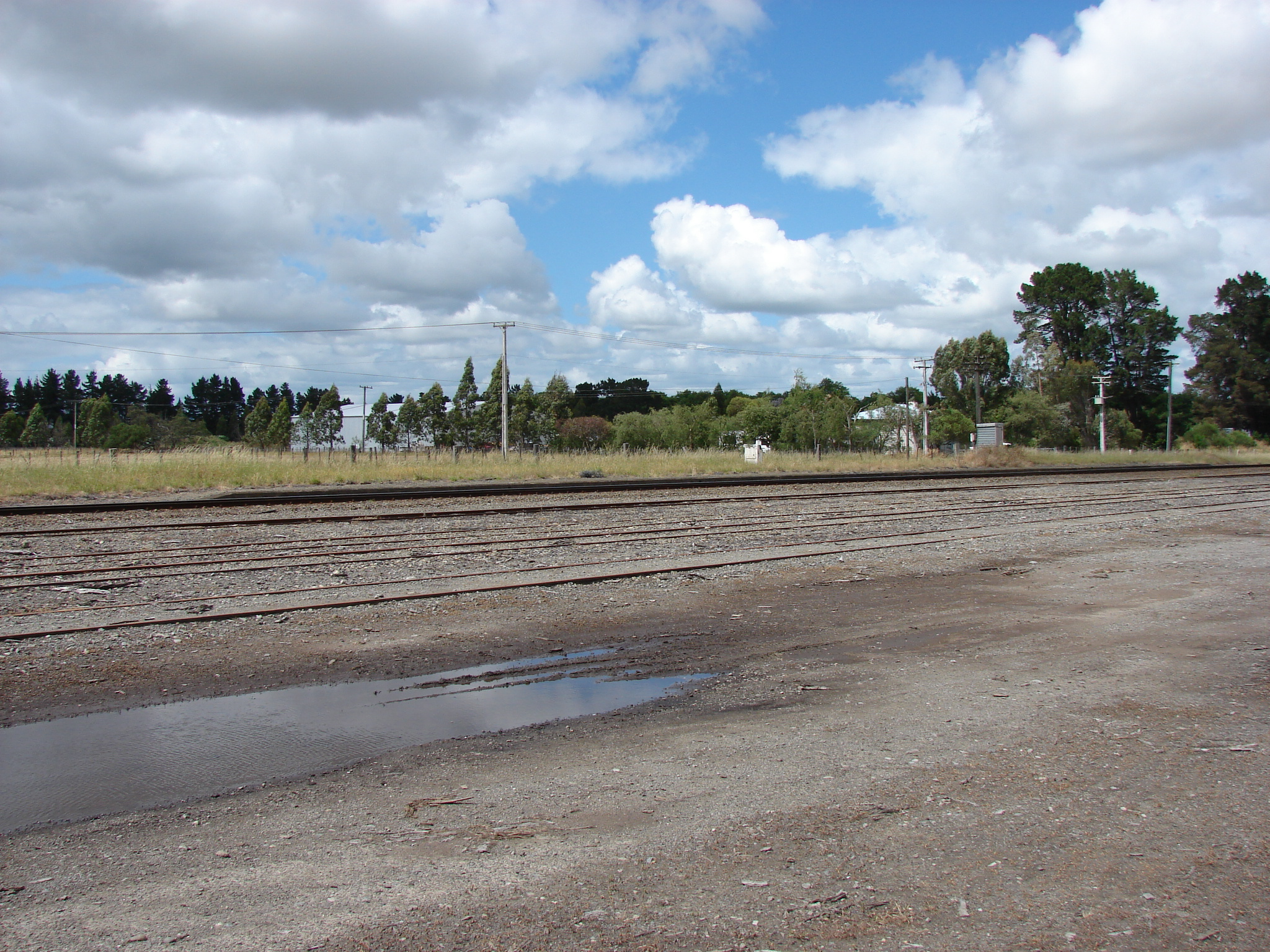
- Waingawa railway station platform in 2007.

General information
- Location: Waingawa Road, Masterton District, New Zealand
- Coordinates: 40°58′8.47″S 175°35′46.82″E
- System: New Zealand Government Railways Department regional rail
- Owner: ONTRACK
- Line: Wairarapa Line
- Platforms: Single side
- Tracks: Main line (1); Wagon loops (4)

Construction
- Parking: No
- Cycle facilities: No

History
- Opened: 30 March 1921
- Closed: 27 February 1987 (freight, general consignments only); 28 September 1992 (passengers)
- Former names: Taratahi
Location
Notes
- Previous Station: Middleton Station; Next Station: Solway Station

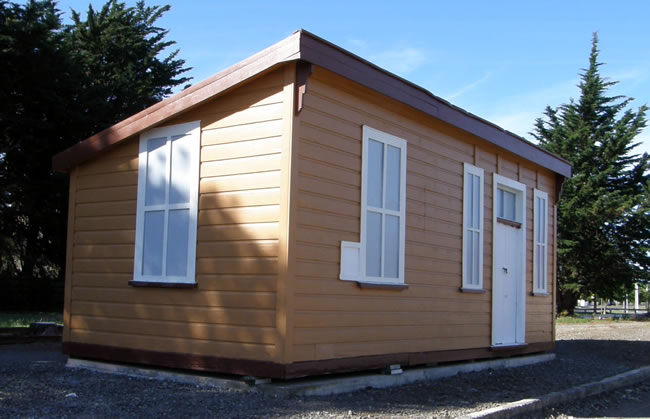
The former Waingawa railway station building preserved at the Carterton station precinct by the Wairarapa Railway Restoration Society.

Waingawa railway station is a station on the Wairarapa Line in the Masterton district of New Zealand's North Island. It is located about 1 kilometre (0.62 mi) south of the Waingawa River and is situated in a heavy industrial area. It served passenger trains until 1992 and now only handles freight (private sidings and special consignments).

== History ==
The first use of the name Waingawa in relation to rail facilities in the Wairarapa was when from 1895 a siding about 2 miles (3.2 km) south of Kurupuni (Solway) became known as Waingawa. It was a private siding that had for a long time been known as Donald's Siding, and was used by the Wellington Meat Export Company to load livestock for transport to their abattoir at Ngahauranga.

Between 1908 and 1912 the Wellington Farmers' Meat Company established their own private siding about 45 chains (3,000 ft; 910 m) south of Waingawa called Taratahi. In 1921 this became the location of a new station called Waingawa, complete with signalling apparatus, and the name Taratahi ceased to be used.

Though a co-operative freezing works were established at Waingawa in 1897, the brisk traffic in livestock from Waingawa to Wellington continued, at least until the opening of the Waingawa Freezing Works. In 1966 a siding was laid from the Waingawa yard to the then-new Masterton sale yards. The sale yards are still extant today but their siding has long since been removed.

Several industrial neighbours have come and gone in the vicinity of Waingawa station. In 1911, the Waingawa Freezing Works were opened by the Wellington Farmers' Meat Company and lasted until 9 November 1989 when, in the hands of AFFCO, the works were closed as part of an industry rationalisation. Japanese forestry products company Juken Nissho (now Juken New Zealand) opened a mill just north of the station in February 1992, which continues to transport goods by rail using its own private siding.

== Today ==
Since the closure of the freezing works, forestry related businesses and trucking companies have largely supplanted the livestock trade at Waingawa, with the JNL mill now the largest rail customer on site. This may change in the future, as several projects are under consideration that may involve the use of rail for the transport of product out of the Wairarapa, including:

- Wairarapa log freight rail project
- Waingawa Industrial Park
- Bulk milk transfer from Waingawa to Hawera via the Manawatu Gorge

In February 2009 funding from the National Land Transport Programme for the log freight project was approved by the NZ Transport Agency. Log traffic started in March 2012 and typically moves around 300 tonnes of logs per day.

The former Waingawa station building was rescued from demolition by the Wairarapa Railway Restoration Society in 1991 and relocated to the Carterton station precinct where it may be viewed by visitors to the museum there.

The only sign at Waingawa that passenger trains used to stop there is the old station platform which can still be seen from Waingawa Road. There is little prospect of a passenger station being re-established here, as Waingawa is officially considered to be part of the "Solway/Masterton rail station catchment".

== Gallery ==
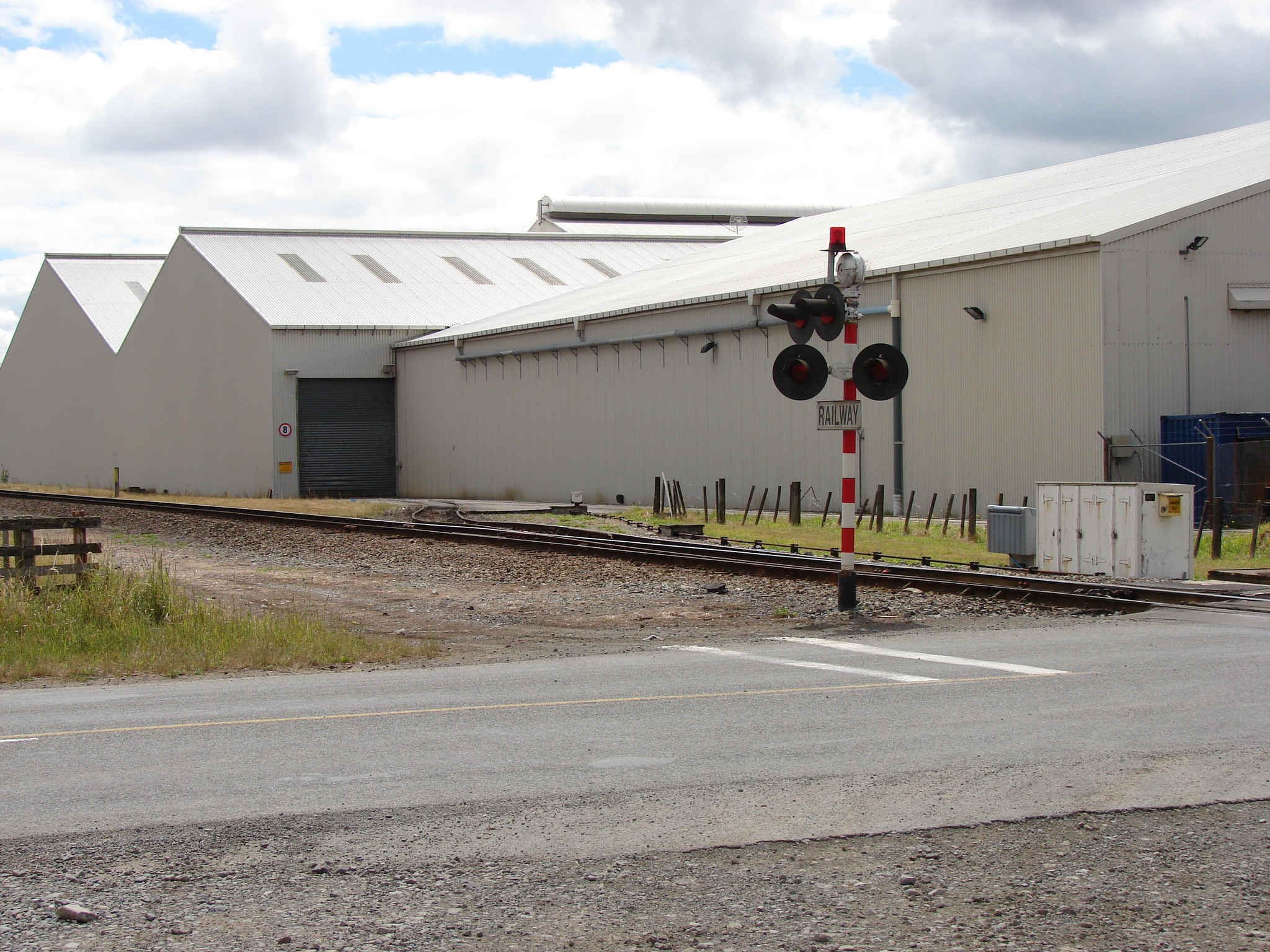
The Juken Nissho mill neighbouring the Waingawa railway station and private rail siding.

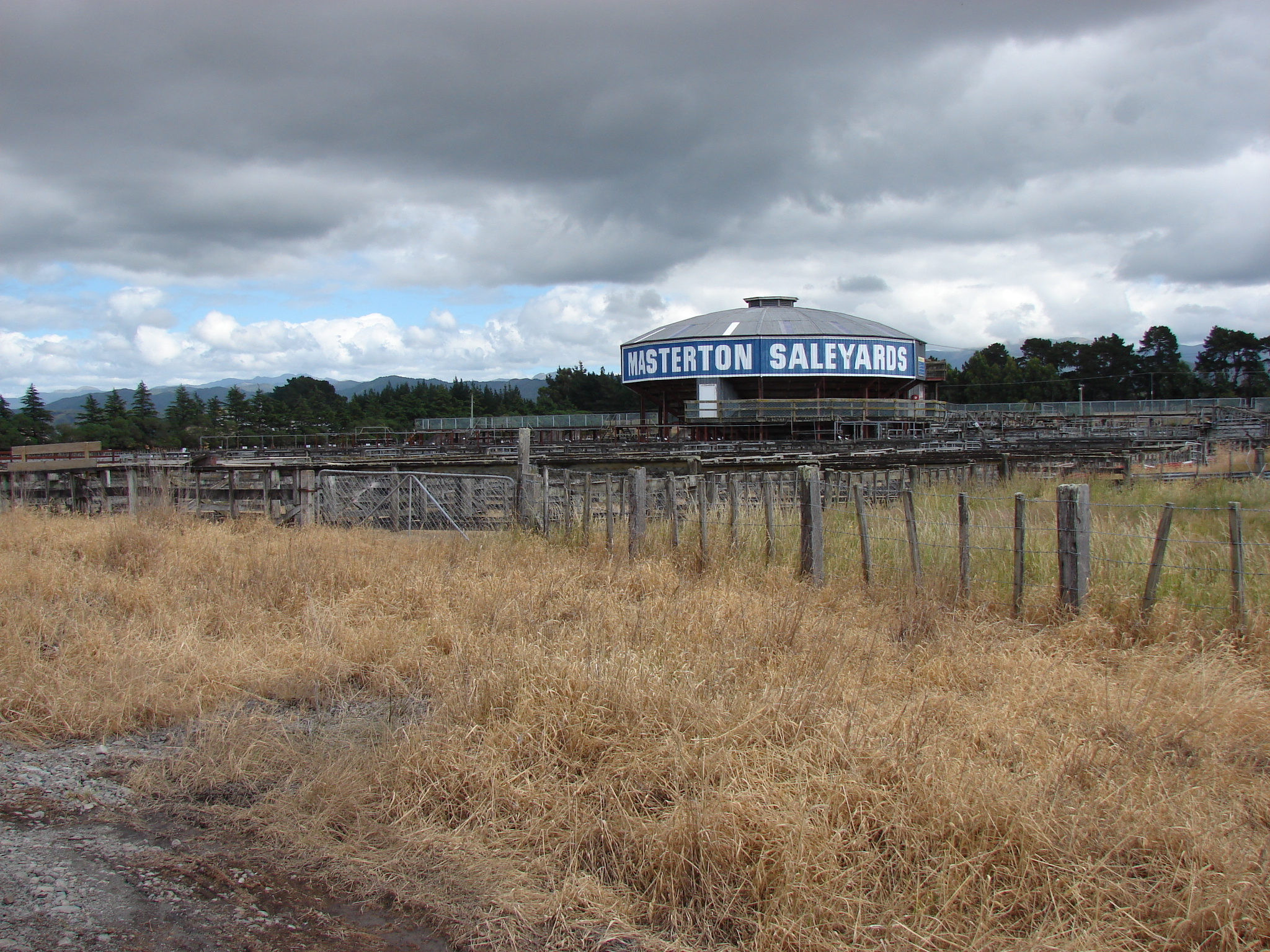
Masterton saleyards, a former rail user at the Waingawa railway station.

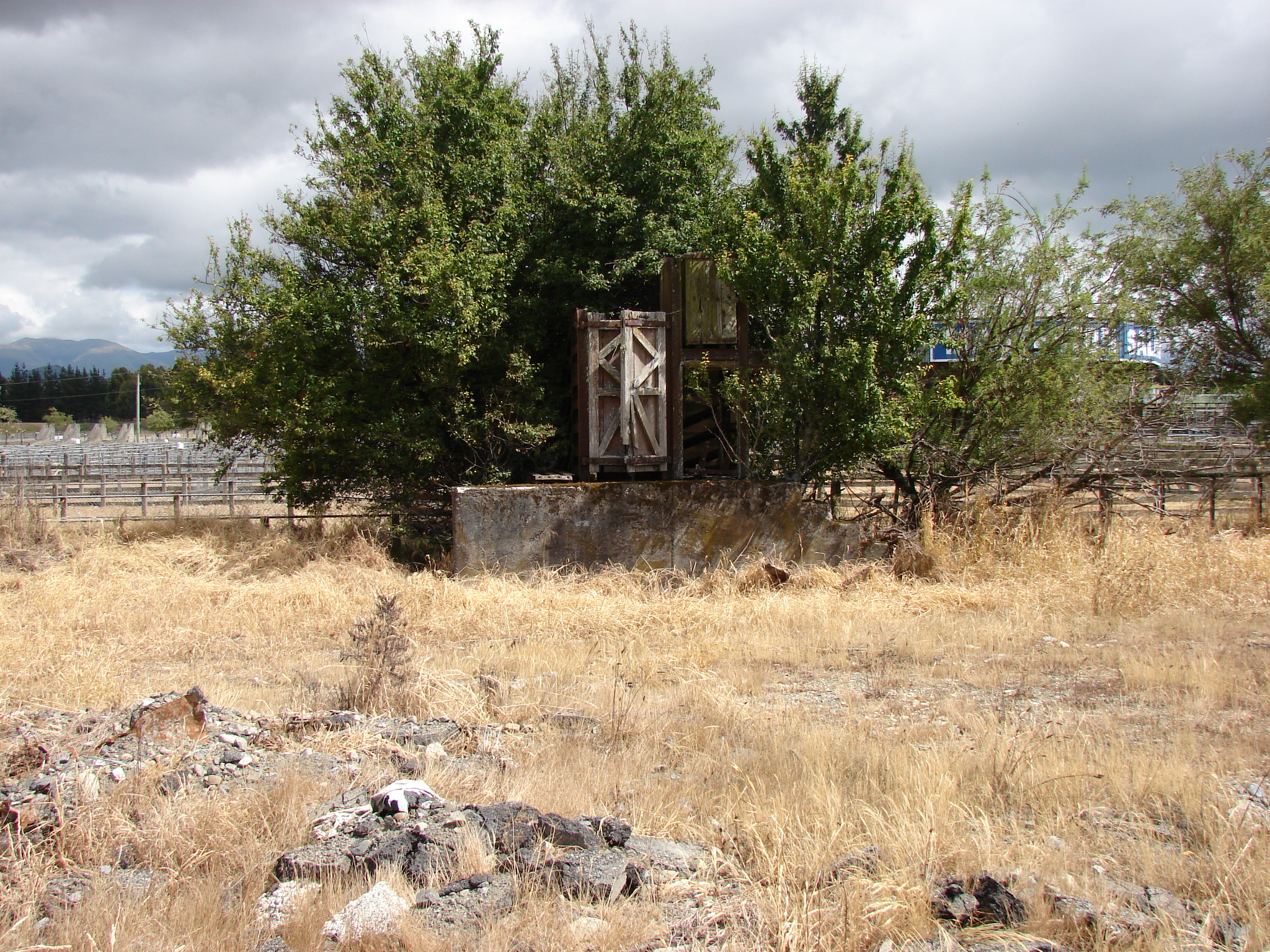
A dual-level stock race behind the Masterton saleyards. Possibly used to load livestock directly into livestock rail wagons?

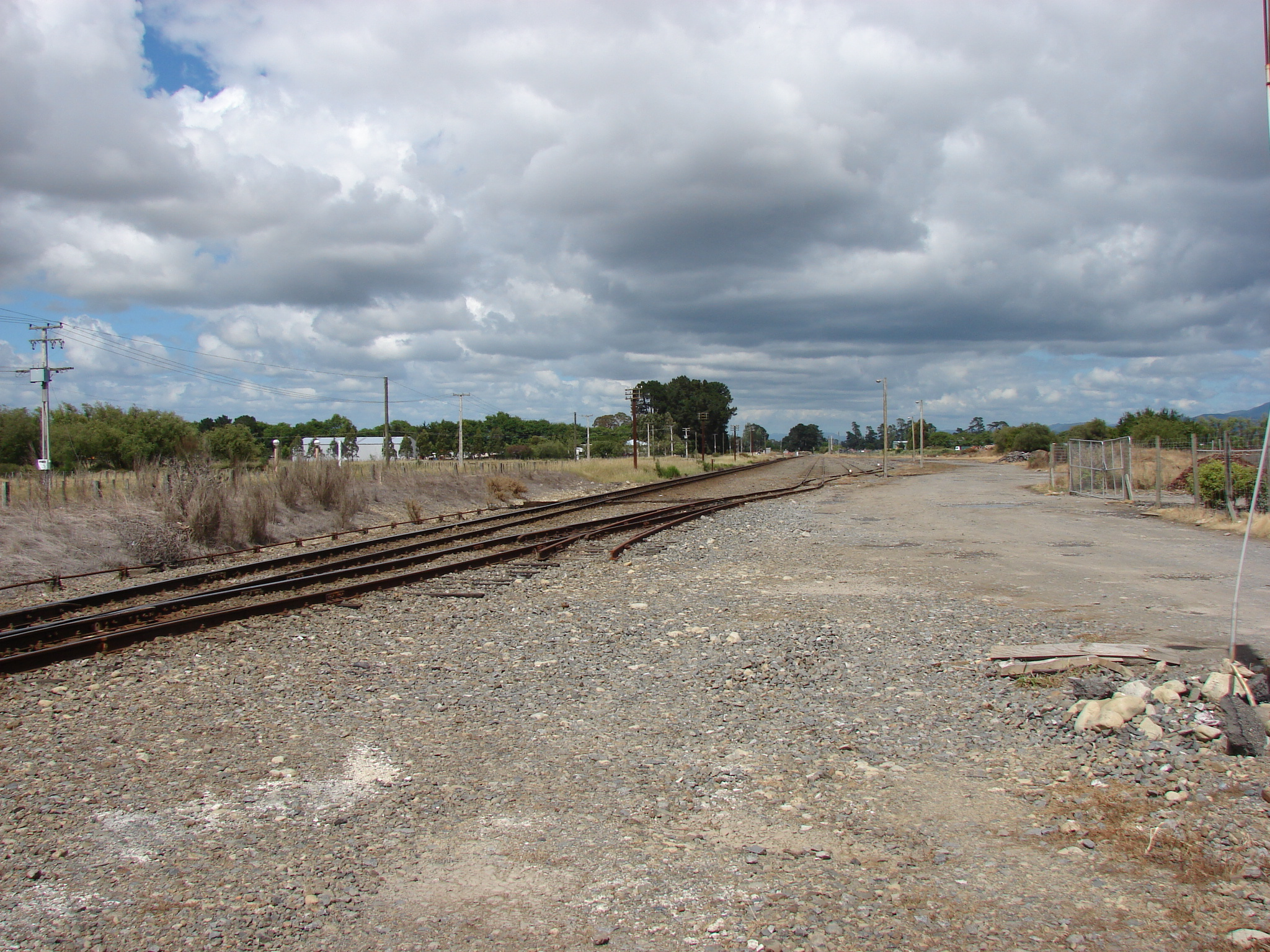
Northern end of the Waingawa railway station yard, bordering Norfolk Road.

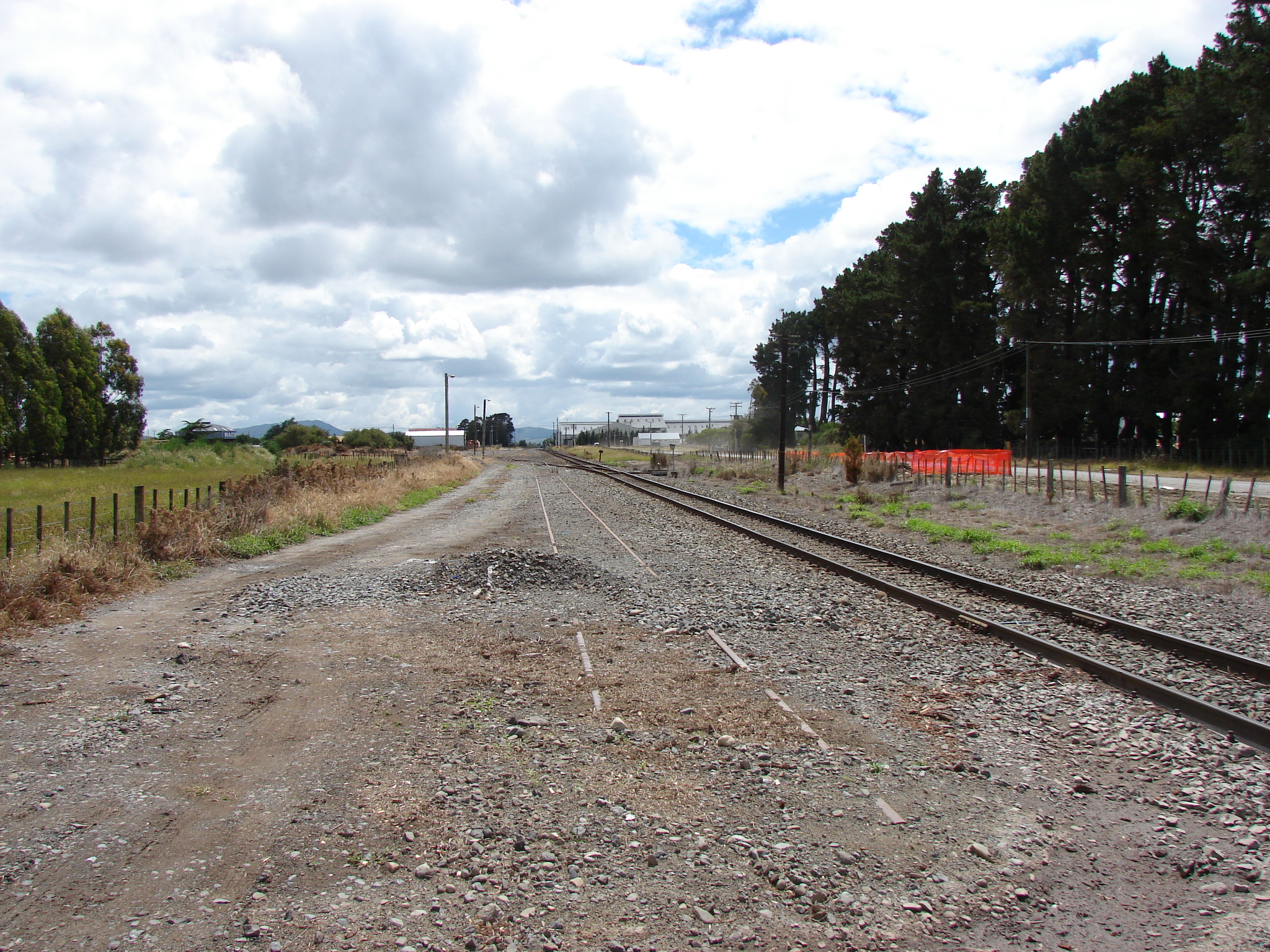
Southern end of the Waingawa railway station yard, bordering Norman Avenue.

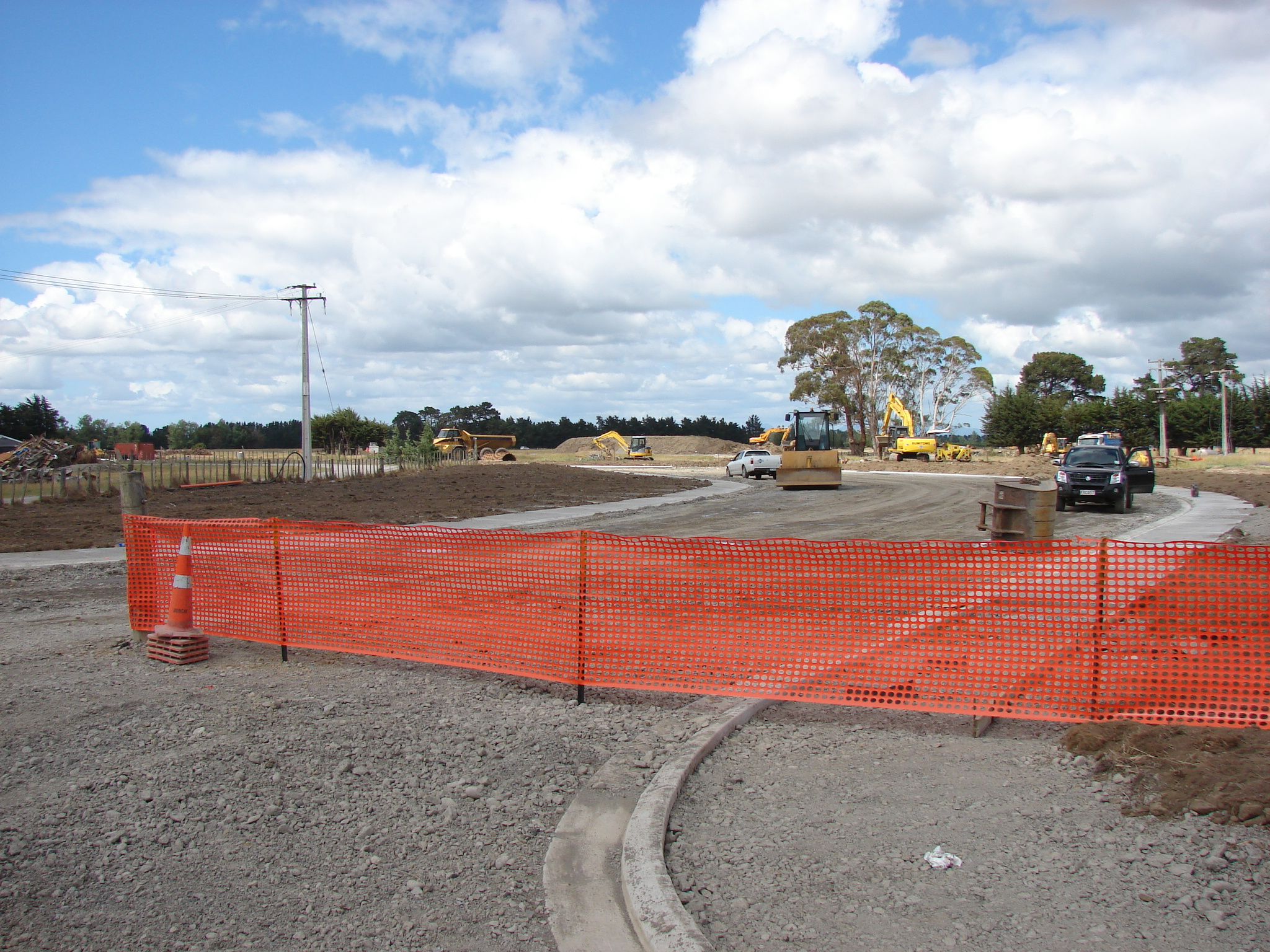
Waingawa Industrial Park under development, to the south of the Waingawa railway station yard.

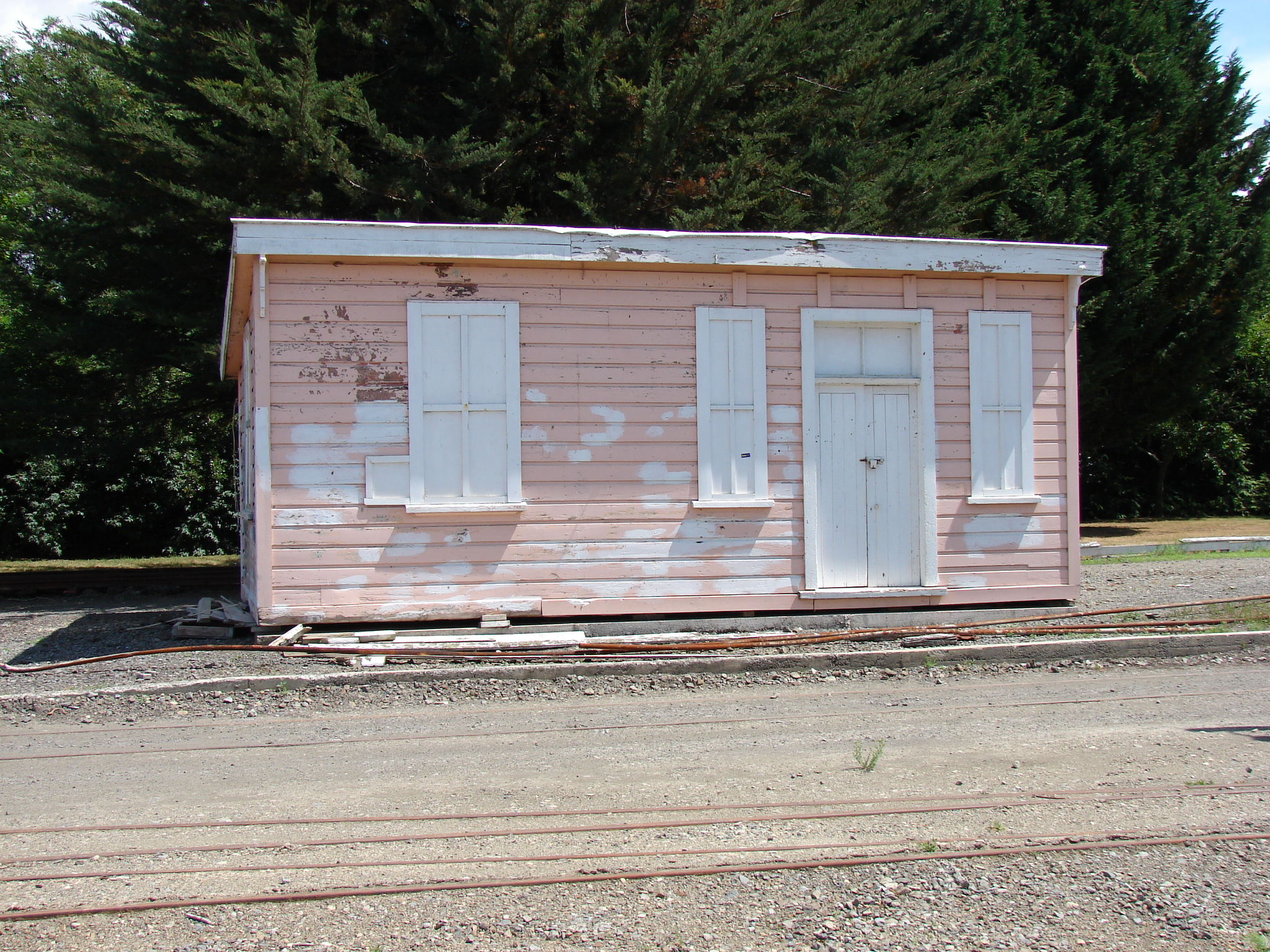
Waingawa railway station building at Carterton.
