= Dalefield =

- Locality
- Interactive map of Dalefield
- Coordinates: 41.026°S 175.477°E
- Country: New Zealand
- Region: Wellington Region
- Territorial authority: Carterton District
- Electorates: Wairarapa; Ikaroa-Rāwhiti (Māori)

Government
  - Territorial Authority: Carterton District Council
  - Regional council: Greater Wellington Regional Council
  - Mayor of Carterton: Steve Cretney
  - Wairarapa MP: Mike Butterick
  - Ikaroa-Rāwhiti MP: Cushla Tangaere-Manuel

Area
  - Total: 19.77 km^{2} (7.63 sq mi)

Population (2023 census)
  - Total: 171
  - Density: 8.65/km^{2} (22.4/sq mi)

Dalefield is a rural community in the Carterton District and Wellington Region of New Zealand's North Island.

It was the location of the Dalefield railway station on the Wairarapa Line between 1880 and 1981. And a nearby active railway station remains - Matarawa railway station.

KiwiRail has identified the Watersons Line crossing in Dalefield as one of the most dangerous railway crossings in Wairarapa.

In May 2018, plans were drawn up to develop a solar plant on a former landfill site in Dalefield but a resource consent was never issued, and is not active with Carterton District Council as of April 2026.

Dalefield also has a lavender farm - Lavender Abbey.

Dalefield also has an artisan cidery - TeePee Cider.

Parts of the area were affected by severe weather during November and December 2018, which caused widespread flooding but prevented a drought.

Flooding of the Dalefield alluvial plain is a regular occurrence in heavy rains with the Mangātarere Stream bursting its banks and the culvert on Dalefield Road over the tributary Taipaitangata stream blocking with tree slash, latest in April 2026 .

== Demographics ==
Dalefield locality covers 19.77 km^{2} (7.63 sq mi). It is part of the larger Mount Holdsworth statistical area.

Historical population
Year	Pop.	±% p.a.
2006	171	—
2013	180	+0.74%
2018	171	−1.02%
2023	171	+0.00%

Dalefield had a population of 171 in the 2023 New Zealand census, unchanged since the 2018 census, and a decrease of 9 people (−5.0%) since the 2013 census. There were 87 males and 87 females in 75 dwellings. The median age was 54.2 years (compared with 38.1 years nationally). There were 21 people (12.3%) aged under 15 years, 18 (10.5%) aged 15 to 29, 90 (52.6%) aged 30 to 64, and 42 (24.6%) aged 65 or older.

People could identify as more than one ethnicity. The results were 98.2% European (Pākehā), and 8.8% Māori. English was spoken by 100.0%, and other languages by 3.5%. No language could be spoken by 3.5% (e.g. too young to talk). New Zealand Sign Language was known by 1.8%. The percentage of people born overseas was 14.0, compared with 28.8% nationally.

Religious affiliations were 31.6% Christian, and 1.8% other religions. People who answered that they had no religion were 57.9%, and 7.0% of people did not answer the census question.

Of those at least 15 years old, 27 (18.0%) people had a bachelor's or higher degree, 96 (64.0%) had a post-high school certificate or diploma, and 30 (20.0%) people exclusively held high school qualifications. The median income was $45,000, compared with $41,500 nationally. 24 people (16.0%) earned over $100,000 compared to 12.1% nationally. The employment status of those at least 15 was 81 (54.0%) full-time, 27 (18.0%) part-time, and 3 (2.0%) unemployed.

== Education ==
Dalefield School is a co-educational state primary school for Year 1 to 8 students, with a roll of 75 as of July 2026. It opened in 1885.

The school established a low-power radio station in 2019.
