= Matarawa railway station =

Railway station in New Zealand

Matarawa
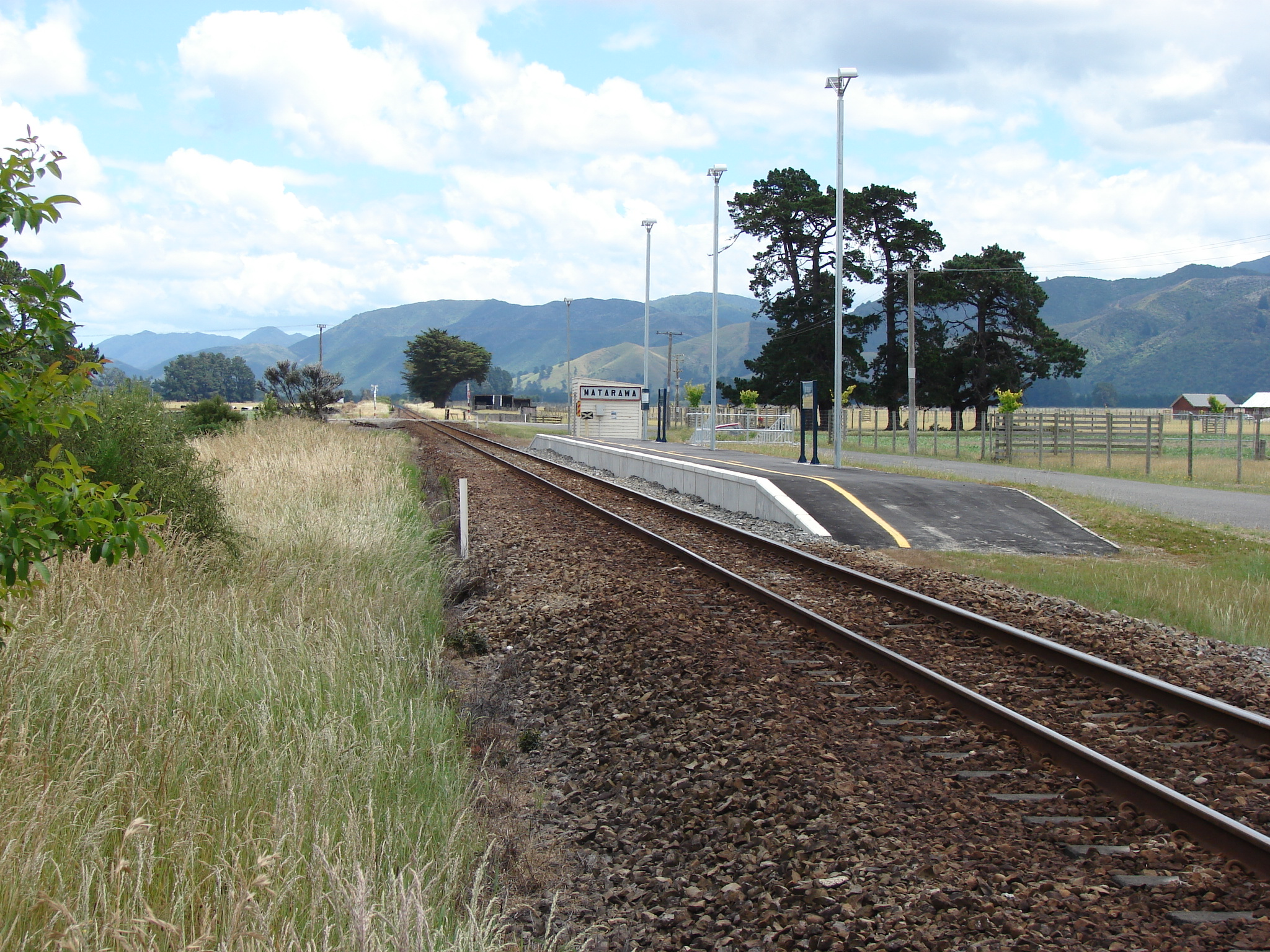
- Matarawa Railway Station in December 2007.

General information
- Location: Railway Road, Dalefield, New Zealand
- Coordinates: 41°2′55.78″S 175°26′53.31″E
- Elevation: 70 metres (230 ft)
- System: Metlink regional rail
- Owner: Greater Wellington Regional Council
- Line: Wairarapa Line
- Distance: 69.61 kilometres (43.25 mi) from Wellington
- Platforms: Single
- Tracks: main line
- Train operators: Transdev Wellington

Construction
- Structure type: At-grade
- Parking: No
- Cycle facilities: No
- Architectural style: Vogel class 6

Other information
- Station code: MATA
- Fare zone: 13

History
- Opened: 1 November 1880; 145 years ago
- Rebuilt: 17 May – 4 June 2007; 19 years ago

Services
Preceding station	Transdev Wellington	Following station
Carterton towards Masterton	Wairarapa Connection	Woodside towards Wellington
Location
Notes
- Previous Station: Woodside Station; Next Station: Dalefield Station

Matarawa railway station is a small single-platform railway station on the Wairarapa Line that serves the small rural community of Matarawa in the Wairarapa district of New Zealand.

== History ==
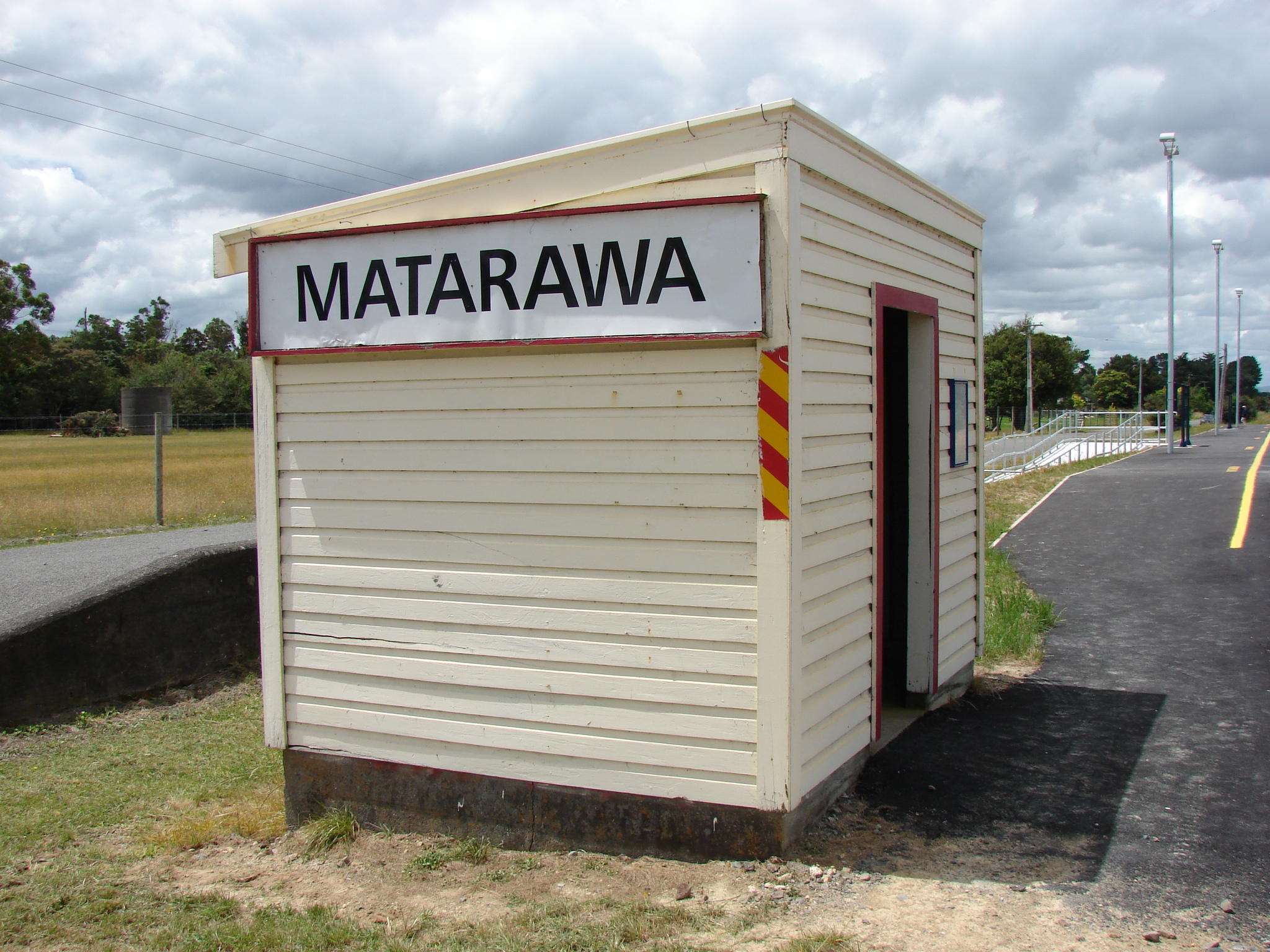
"Vogel-era" class 6 passenger shelter shed.

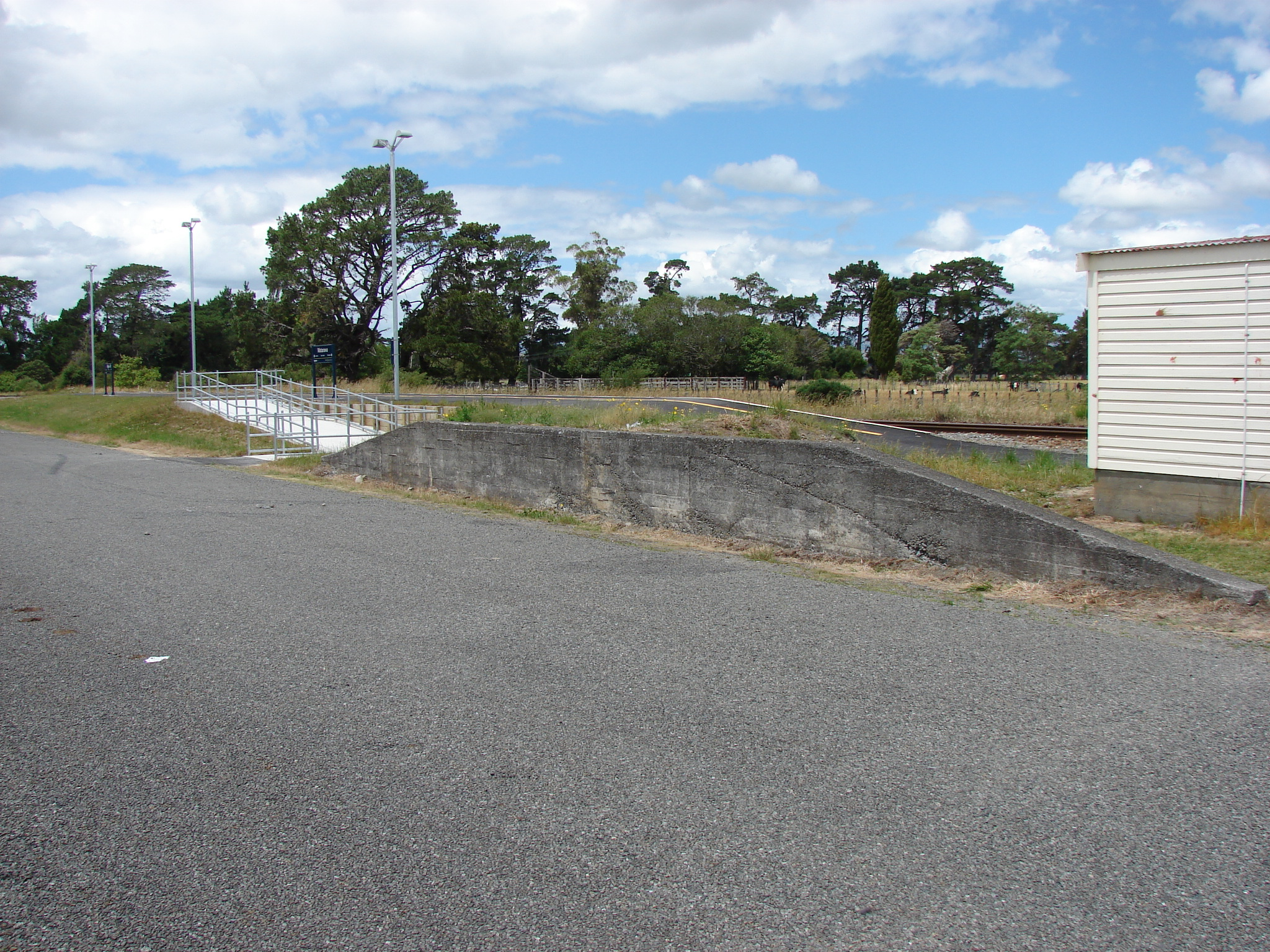
Loading bank.

This station opened on 1 November 1880, when the line between Woodside Junction and Masterton was officially opened. Initially it had a shelter shed, loading bank and crossing loop and was used to cross trains until the introduction of signalling at the larger Wairarapa stations. In its early years several sawmills flourished in the vicinity, with timber making up a bulk of the goods loaded. The crossing loop and private sawmill sidings have been removed.

The station was closed to all traffic on 1 February 1981. It was re-opened 17 days later to passenger traffic only.

In 2006, with the introduction of the SW-class carriages for the Wairarapa Connection service looming, it was proposed that this station be closed due to its low patronage and the cost involved in building a platform so that passengers could safely board and disembark from the new carriages. After vocal opposition from local residents, this proposal was rescinded.

This station was temporarily closed from 17 May 2007 to 4 June 2007 to enable construction work to proceed on preparations for the new carriages. The station was reopened on 7 June 2007 with a new platform (prior to the upgrade it did not have a platform).

== Services ==
The request stop is served by the Wairarapa Connection, which has five services each way on Monday to Thursday, six on Friday and two on Saturday and Sunday. Trains run to Masterton and Wellington. The Wairarapa Connection is to be replaced by the New Zealand BEMU class electric multiple unit from 2030.

No bus routes serve the station.
