= Wairarapa Railway Restoration Society =

Coordinates: 41.0217°S 175.5234°E

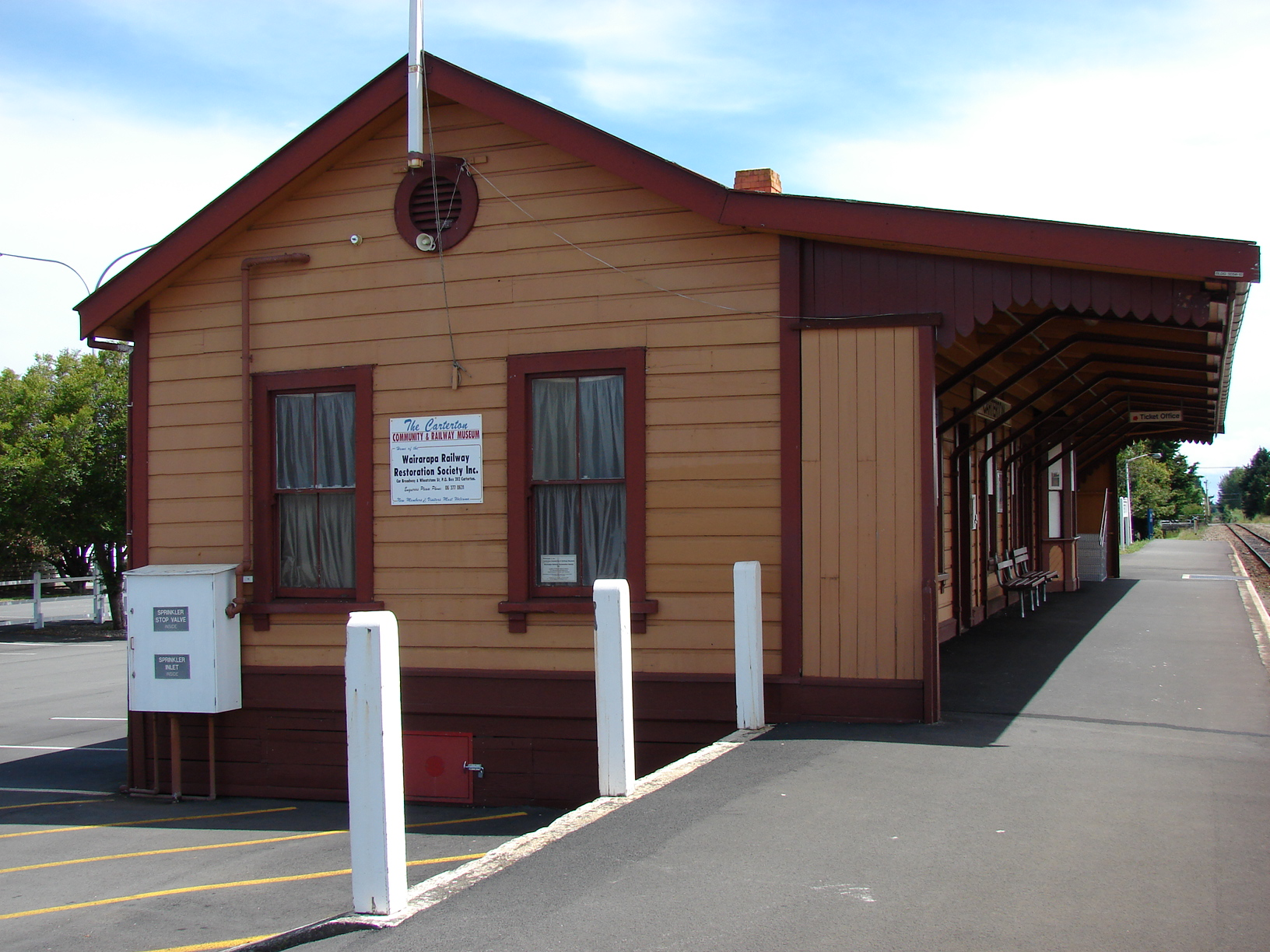
The Carterton railway station

The Wairarapa Railway Restoration Society is a railway heritage and preservation community group in the town of Carterton, in the Carterton District of Wairarapa on New Zealand's lower North Island. The society has leased the Carterton railway station building through the Carterton District Council, though it is owned by the New Zealand Railways Corporation.

The society operates a museum from the station using volunteer labour, in which items of railway and other local historical interest are on display. This includes static displays in the station building, as well as items of railway rolling stock which are stored in the station yard. The Wairarapa Line runs through the site and the station also serves as a stop for the Wairarapa Connection passenger train.

== History ==
The impetus for the formation of the society was a proposal in the 1980s to demolish the historic station building at Carterton station and replace it with a more modern structure. Some concerned locals formed a group in 1990 with the goal of preventing this and restoring the station building. The museum opened a short time later.

After recovering from an arson attack in 1993, the refurbishment was finally completed in 1996.

Since then, the society has been responsible for maintenance of the buildings and fences at the site, and has worked with other local like-minded groups to acquire items of local historical interest for their archives and display in the Carterton Railway Museum at the Carterton railway station.

== Affiliated groups ==
The society is a member of the following organisations:

- Wairarapa Heritage Association
- Federation of Rail Organisations of New Zealand (FRONZ)

The society has also worked with the Carterton District Historical Society to acquire memorabilia for the museum, and has the support of the Carterton District Council and Rail Heritage Trust of New Zealand.

== Museum ==
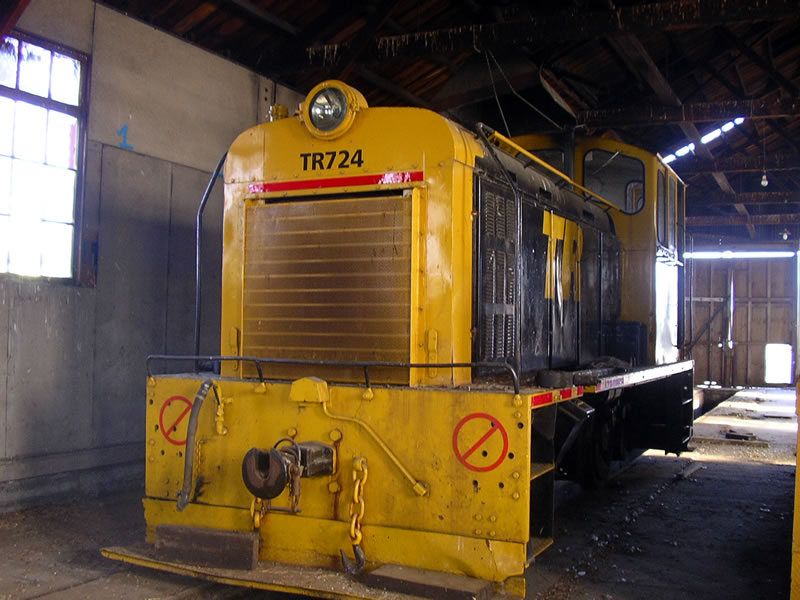
A&G Price locomotive T^{R} class 170 (TMS TR724) - stored offsite.

The museum normally opens to the public on Sundays. Displays include:

- Rolling stock
- Photographs
- Railway artefacts
- Waingawa station building
- Railway signalling apparatus
- Railway motor trolleys
- A&G Price Shunting locomotive T^{R} class 170 (TMS TR724) - stored offsite

Upon occasion, the society has been involved in or associated with plans to relocate other buildings of historical railway interest in the Wairarapa to the Carterton station precinct for preservation purposes, including the Greytown station goods shed (currently located on West Street in Greytown) and the class 6 passenger shelter building from Solway station.
