= Carterton railway station =

Railway station in New Zealand

Carterton
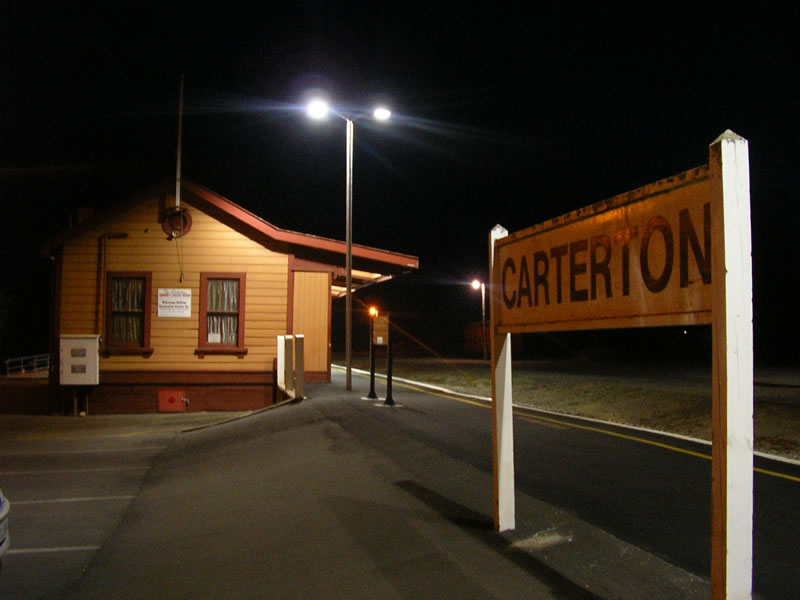
- Carterton Railway Station at night in 2007.

General information
- Location: Wheatstone Street, Carterton, New Zealand
- Coordinates: 41°1′18″S 175°31′23.89″E
- Elevation: 78 metres (256 ft)
- System: Metlink regional rail
- Owner: Greater Wellington Regional Council
- Operator: Wairarapa Railway Restoration Society (lessee)
- Line: Wairarapa Line
- Distance: 76.6 kilometres (47.6 mi) from Wellington
- Platforms: Single side
- Tracks: 1 main line; 1 crossing loop (lifted 2007); 3 road / loop sidings; 2 back-shunts (lifted); Loading bank siding; Stock yard siding (lifted); Back road siding (partly lifted)
- Train operators: Transdev Wellington

Construction
- Structure type: At-grade
- Parking: Yes
- Cycle facilities: Yes, limited
- Architectural style: "Vogel era" Special Class (gable)

Other information
- Station code: CART
- Fare zone: 13
- Classification: RHTNZ Category B building

History
- Opened: 1 November 1880; 146 years ago
- Closed: 13 October 1986; 40 years ago (freight)

Passengers
- 2012: >358 passengers/day

Services
Preceding station	Transdev Wellington	Following station
Solway towards Masterton	Wairarapa Connection	Matarawa towards Wellington
Location
Notes
- Previous Station: Dalefield Station; Next Station: Clareville Station

Carterton railway station is a suburban railway station serving Carterton, New Zealand. The station is located on the Wairarapa Line, 76.6 km (47.6 mi) north of Wellington and 14.4 km (8.9 mi) south of Masterton. The station has a single seven-car side platform.

The Wairarapa Connection serves the station several times daily with services to Wellington and Masterton.

This station retains its original station building (built in 1879-80), freight yard and loading bank, though freight is no longer accepted. A ticket office operates in the station building prior to the departure of commuter trains bound for Wellington. Heritage rolling stock is stored in the yard.

The Carterton Railway Museum, operated from the station building by the Wairarapa Railway Restoration Society, is open every Sunday between 10am and 4pm.

== History ==
Construction of buildings for use by railway staff and the station itself was underway in May 1880, with the station master's house (used initially as the resident engineer's office); followed a month or two later by the station building.

The first train to depart was a special goods train carrying a load of timber, on 5 July 1880. It was another three months before goods consignments were accepted, on 11 October 1880, with the first goods train running to Masterton two days later. The first passenger train ran on 30 October 1880. The line between Woodside and Masterton and the station were officially opened on 1 November 1880.

In 1884 Carterton was recorded as having a five-room station building with a 60-by-30-foot (18.3 by 9.1 m) goods shed and watering facilities. Cattle and sheep yards and a loading bank were installed prior to 1890. There were three loops, holding 56, 23, and 9 wagons; a goods shed road holding 9; and a siding behind it with capacity of 32. In 1884 the station sold 6,530 passenger tickets, and handled 13,610 tons of goods outward and 1,583 tons inward and 20,875 head of livestock, mostly sheep and mostly outward.

Carterton was a staffed station until 1989 when the last staff positions were withdrawn. This move led to a decline in the condition of the station buildings, a situation which in part prompted the formation of the Wairarapa Railway Restoration Society. The goods shed and some unused track which was used for marshalling purposes were removed in the late 1980s.

The Society has saved the Waingawa station building in the early 1990s, along with the Clareville station, it is now located beside the loading bank in the Carterton Station Yard.

== Future ==
As part of the New Zealand Upgrade Programme announced by the government on 29 January 2020, a new passing loop will be installed at Carterton.

== Services ==
There are five Wairarapa Connection trains each way Monday to Thursday, six Friday and two Saturday and Sunday. There are occasional excursions, such as the Daffodil Express and the Tararua Tourer run by Mainline Steam.

== Gallery ==
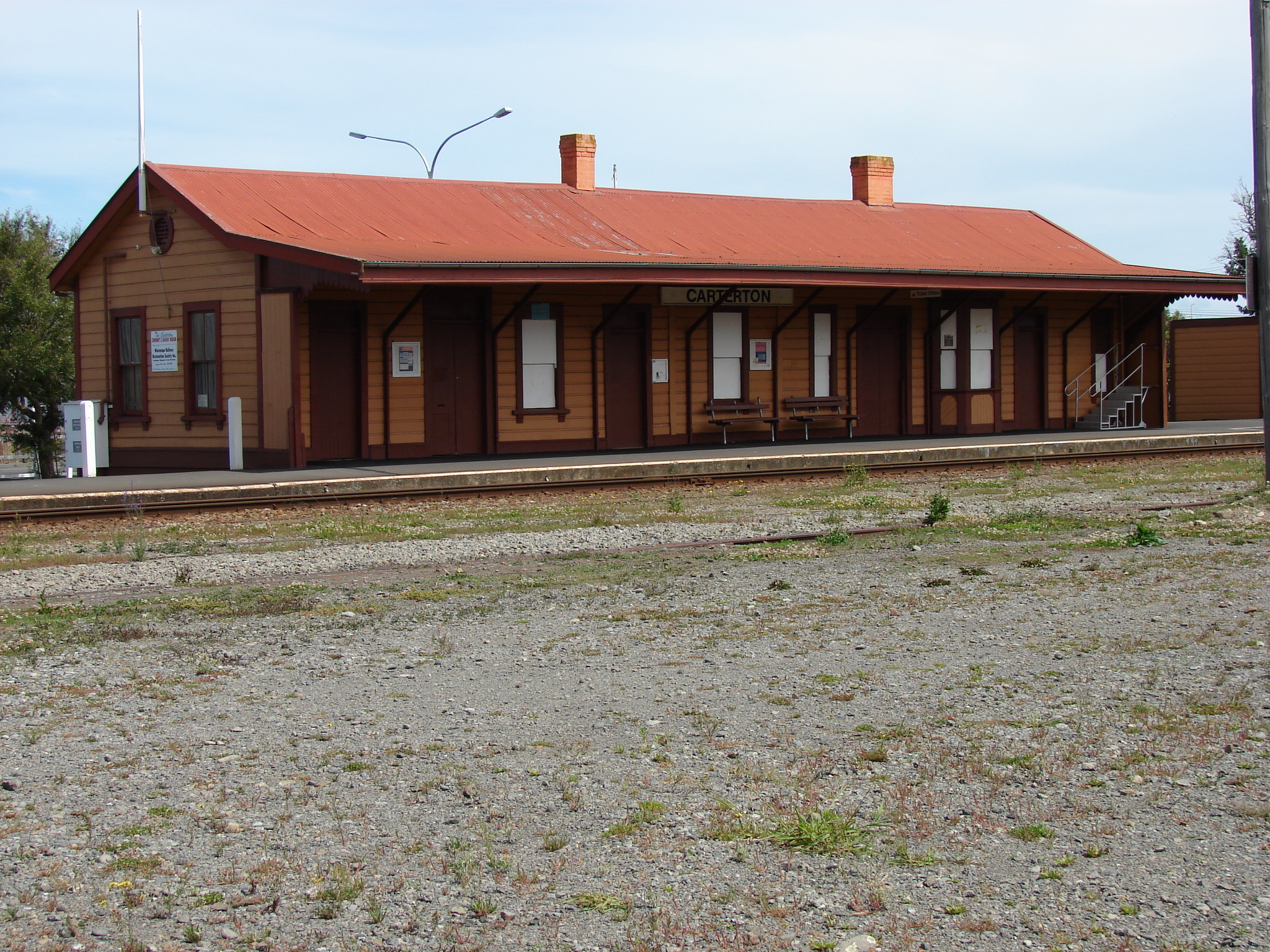
Station from yard, 2006.

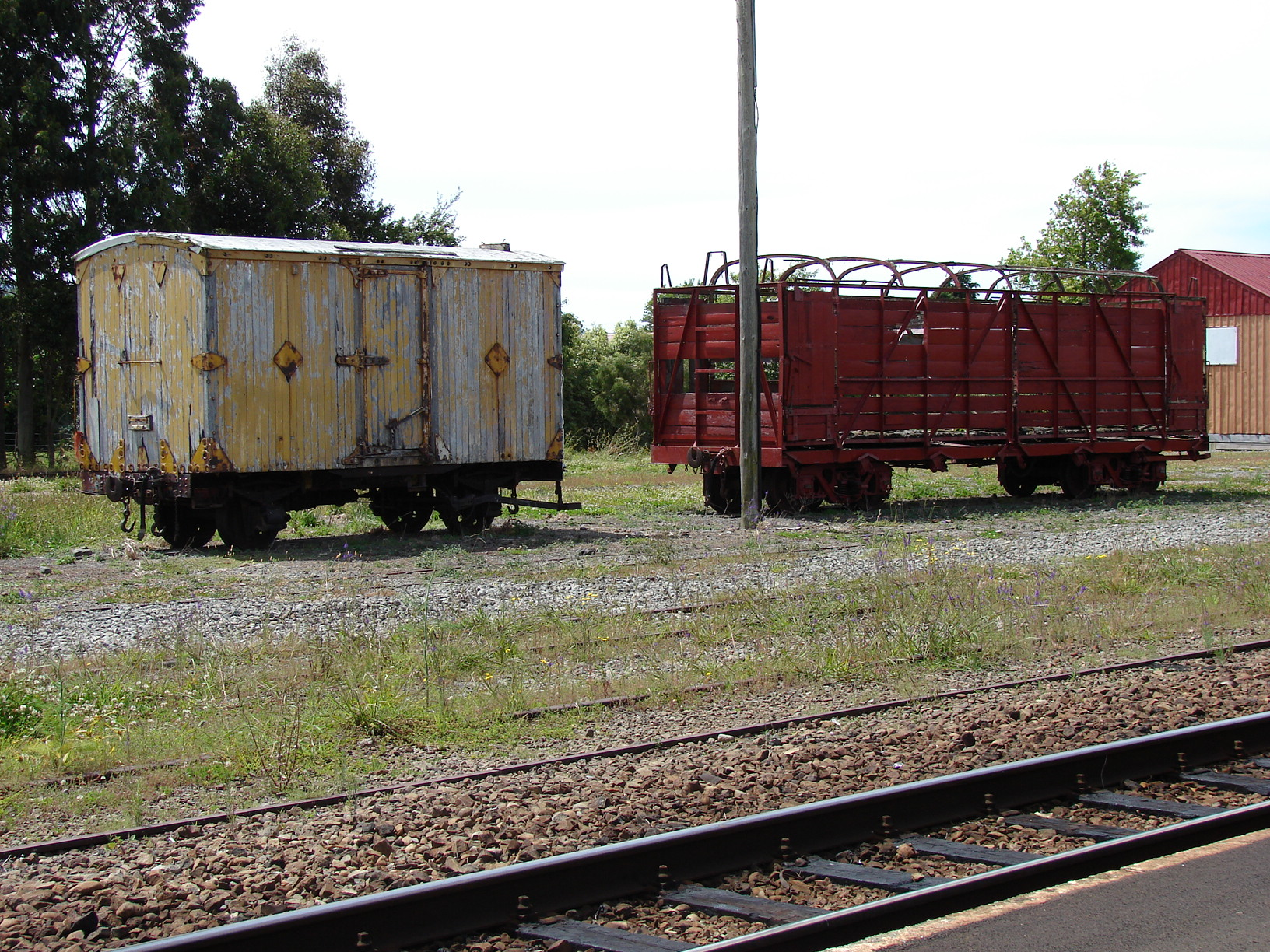
Four-wheel goods van and stock wagon, 2006

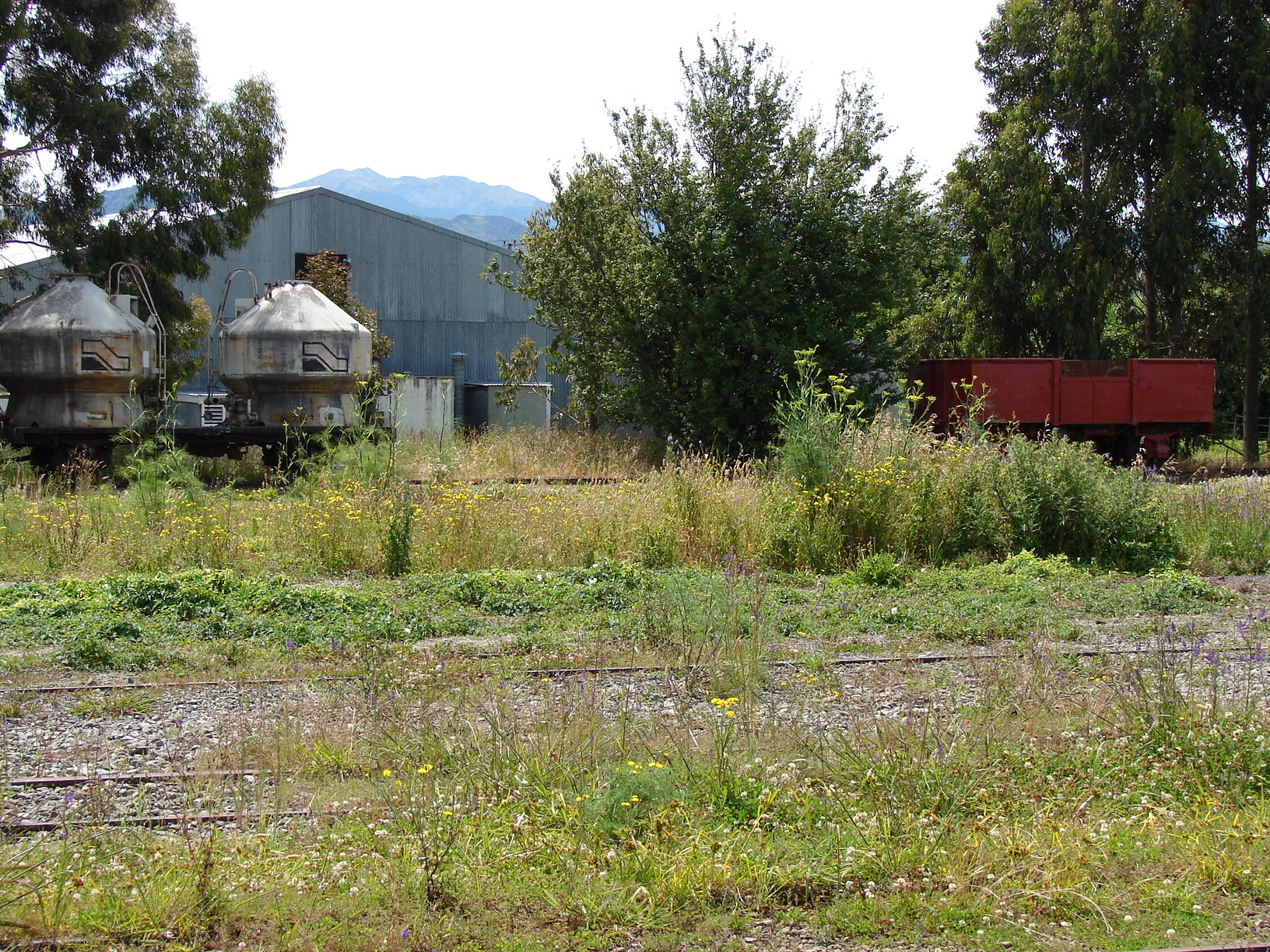
Heritage rolling stock, 2006

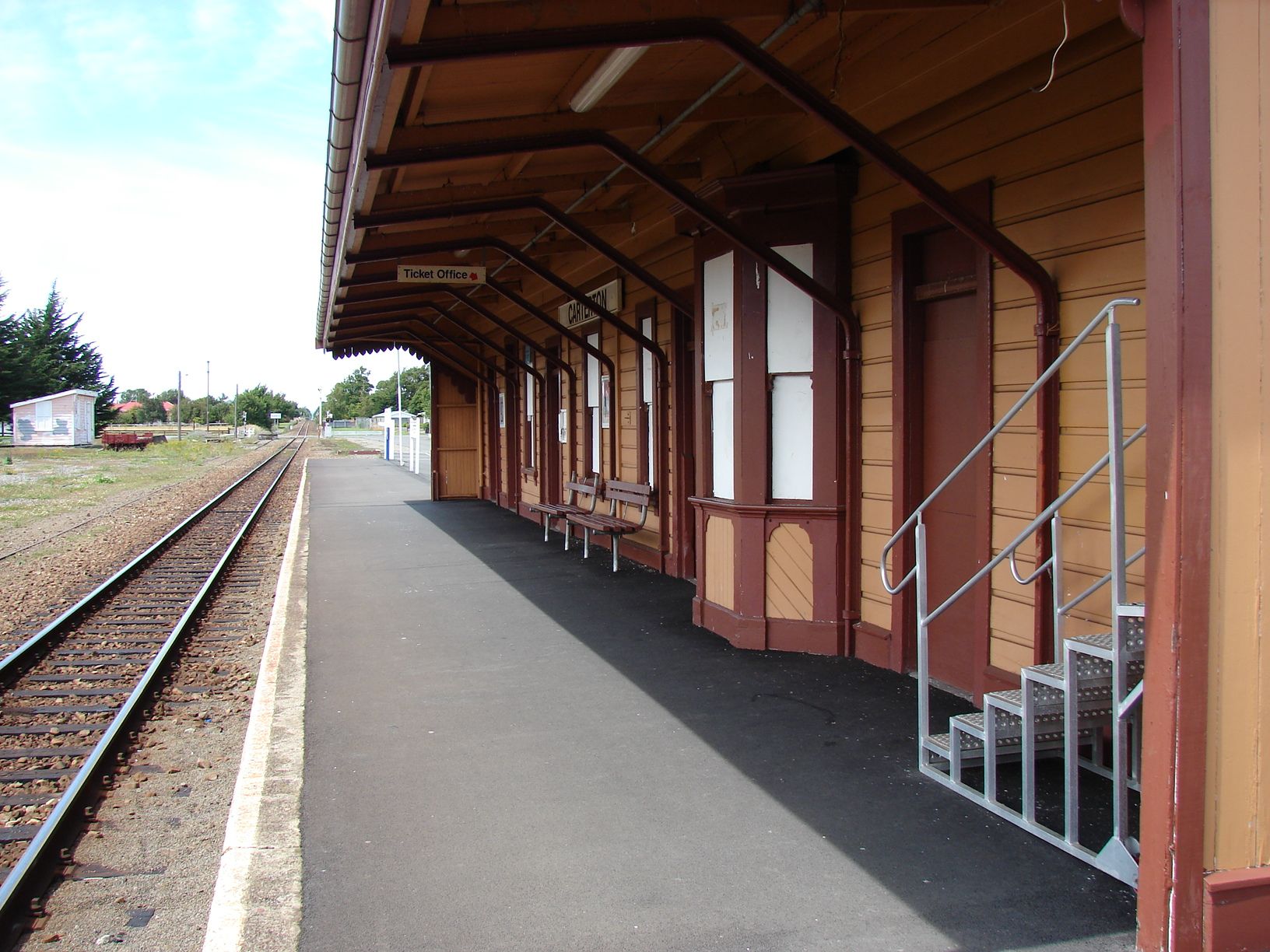
Platform looking north-east, 2006

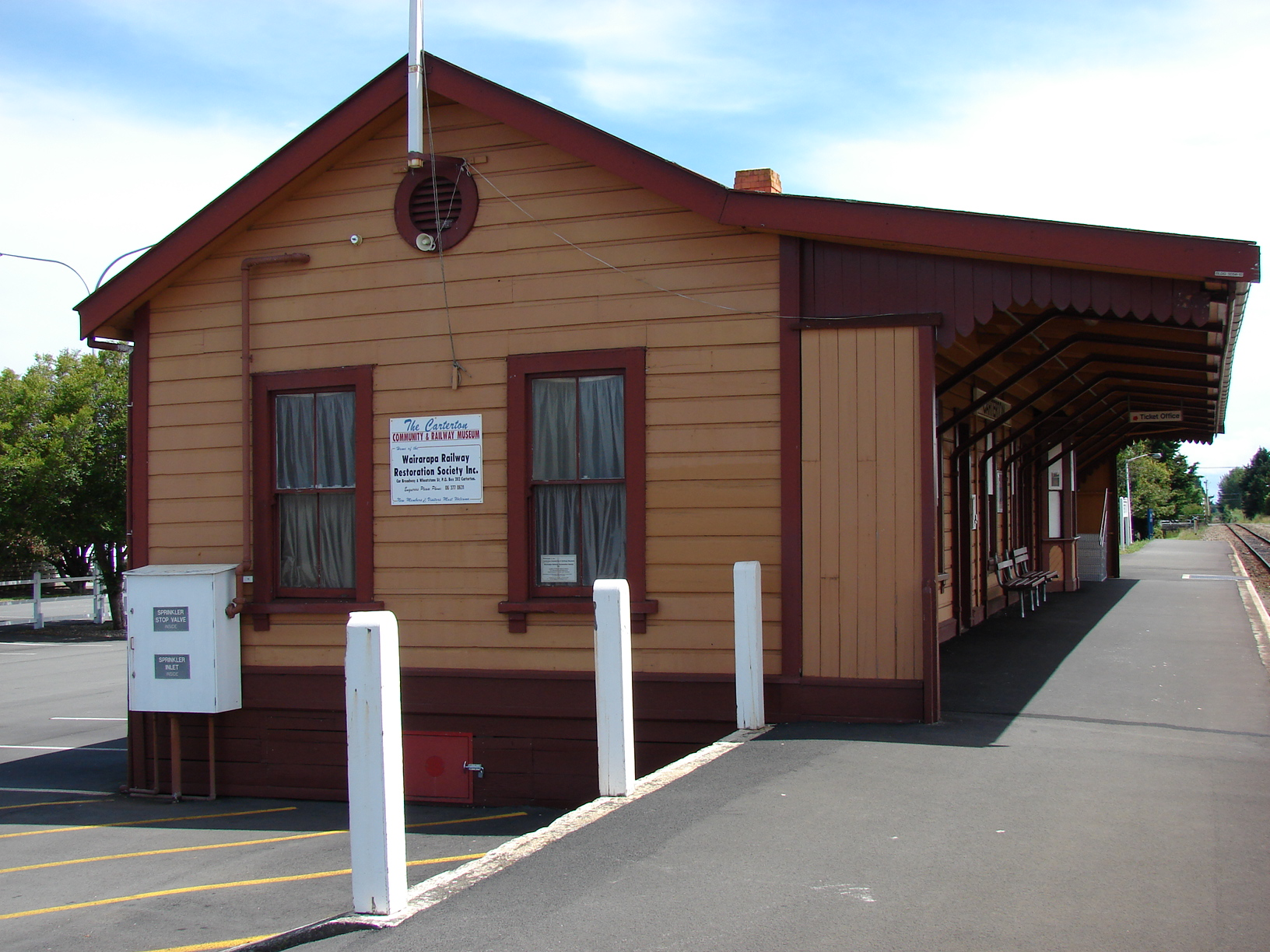
Platform looking south-west, 2006

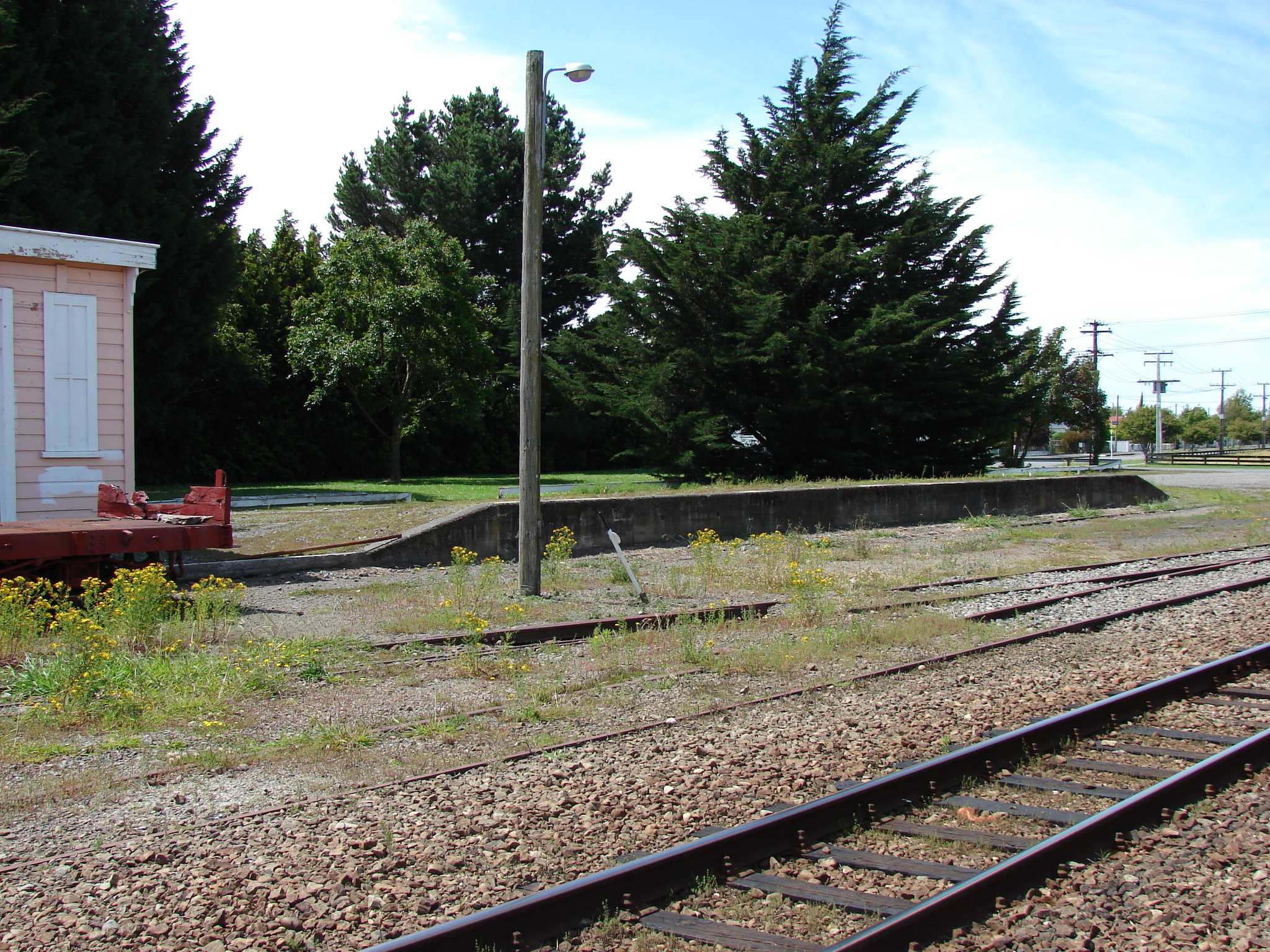
Loading Bank, 2006

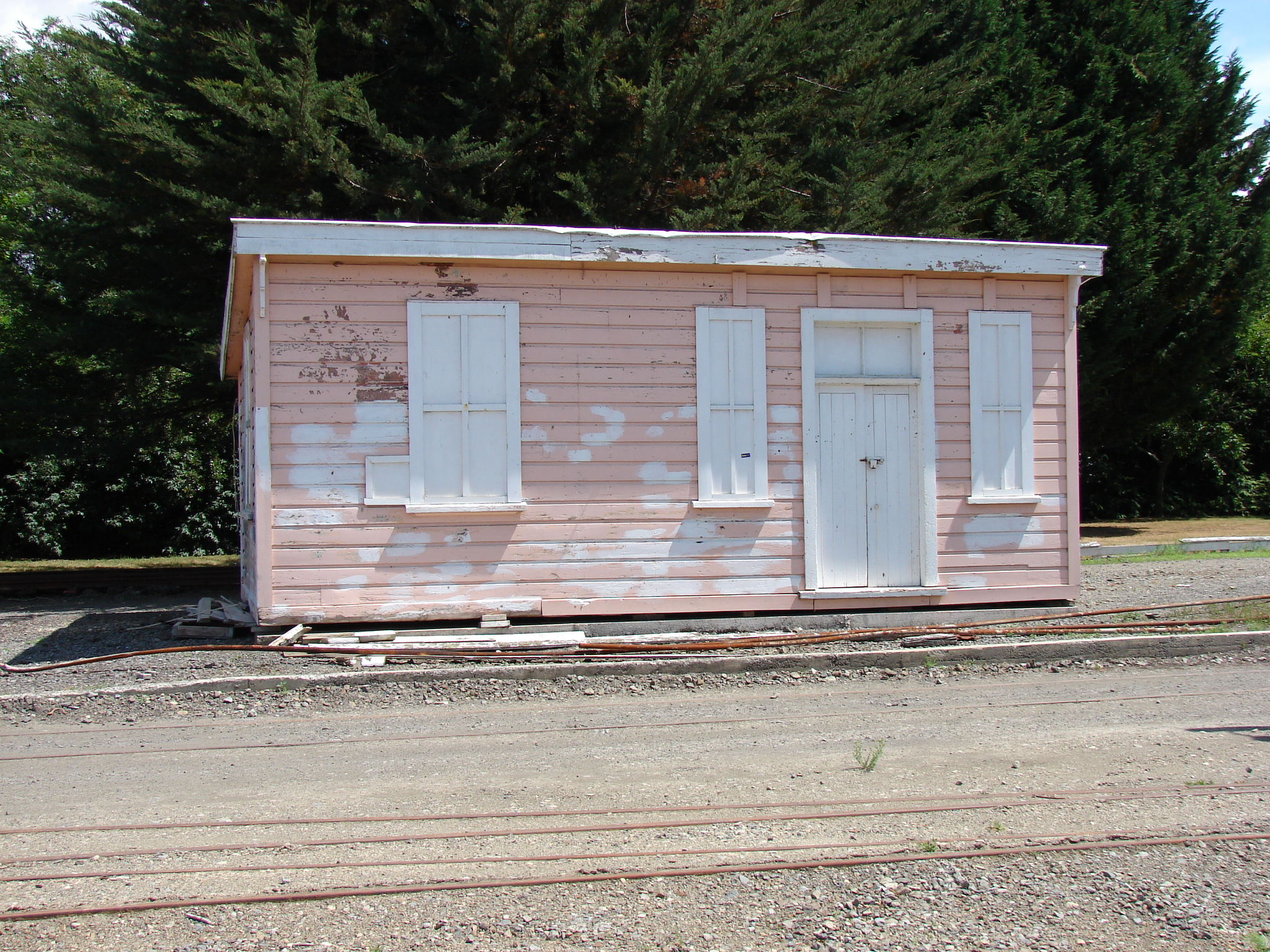
Waingawa railway station, beside Loading Bank, 2006

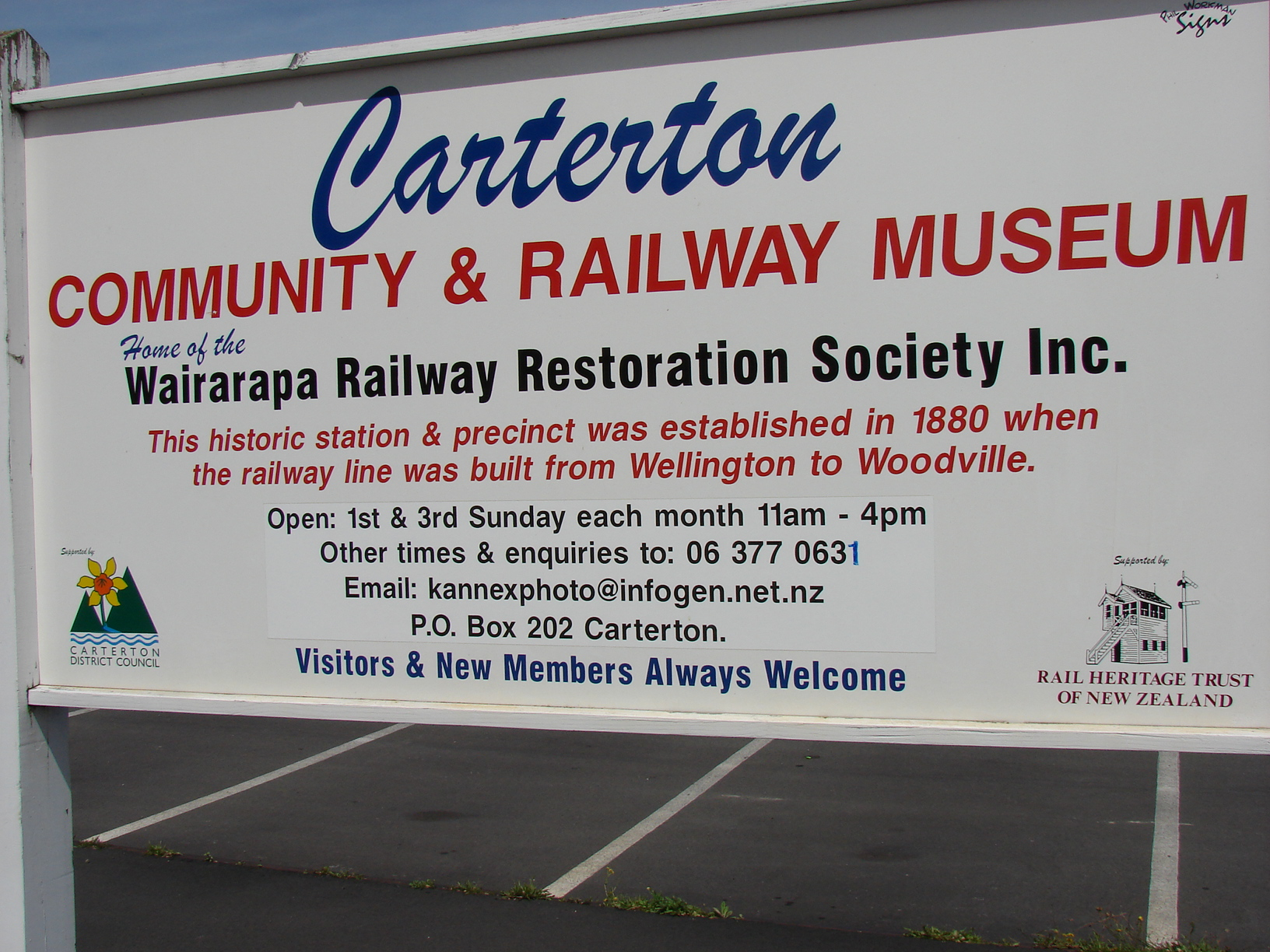
Museum and Restoration Society sign as viewed 2006

Museum and Restoration Society Sign as viewed 2008

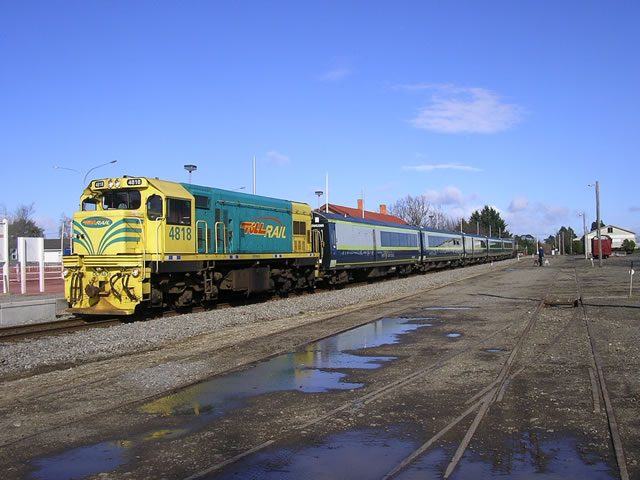
Wairarapa Connection at Carterton, DCP4818 and SW set, 2007

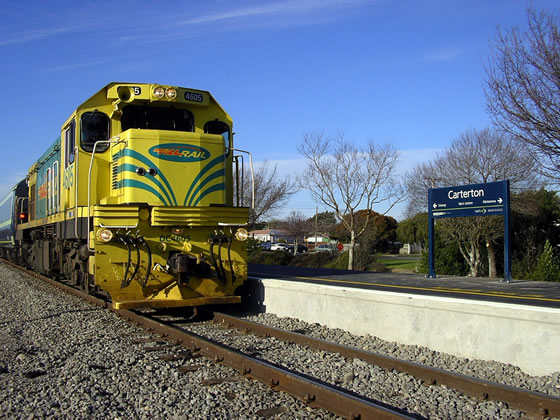
DC4605 at Carterton station with Wairarapa Connection, 2007

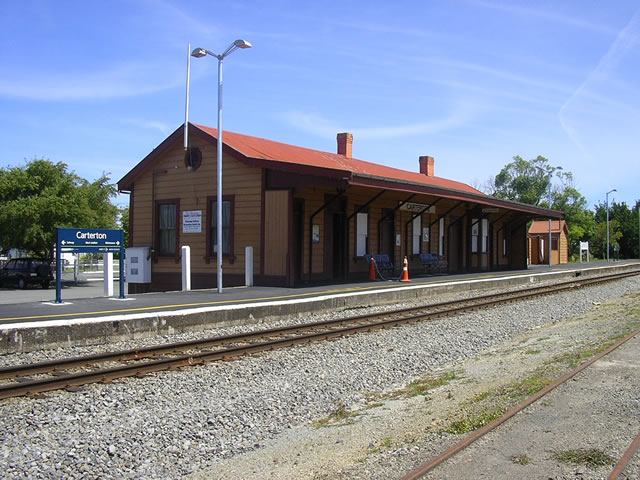
Carterton railway station, 2007

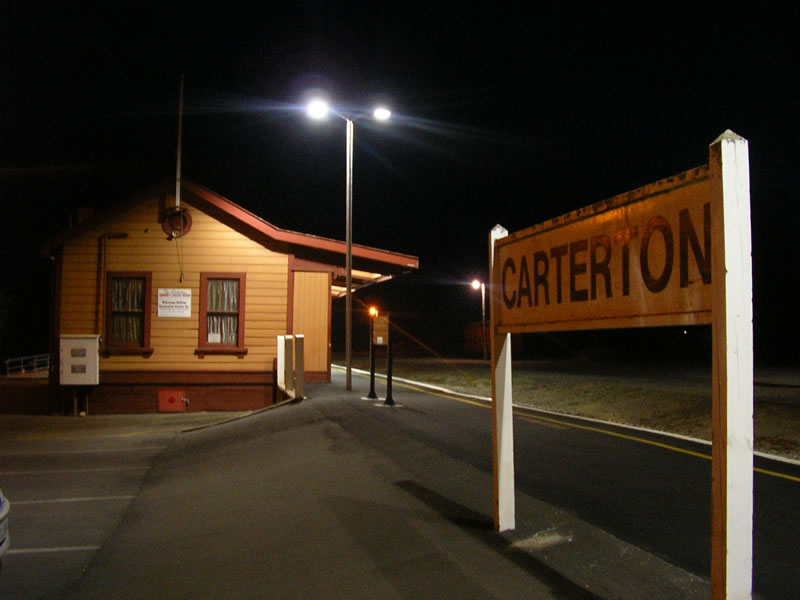
Carterton railway station at night, 2007

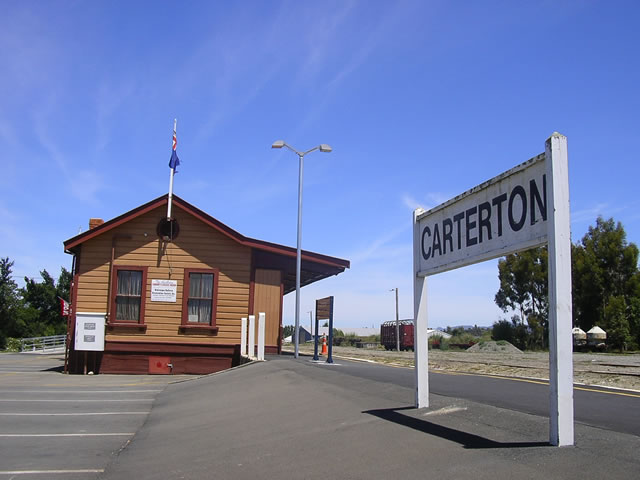
Carterton railway station, 2007

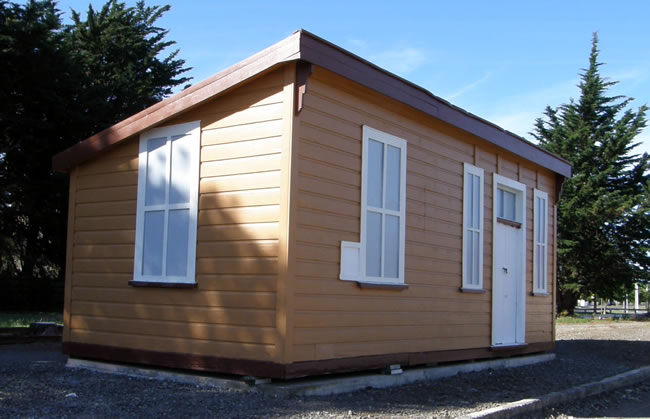
Waingawa railway station, 2008

== See also ==
- Wairarapa Railway Restoration Society

Preceded by Dalefield railway station	Stations on the Wairarapa Line	Succeeded by Clareville railway station
