= Backcountry huts in Tararua Forest Park =

Huts in Tararua Forest Park includes all official backcountry huts and bivouac shelters located within Tararua Forest Park, in the lower North Island of New Zealand. Covering roughly 1,150 km^{2} (440 sq mi) across the Wellington Region, Kāpiti Coast District, and Wairarapa, the Tararua Forest Park is the largest conservation area in the lower North Island. It was established in 1954 as New Zealand's first official Forest Park.

== Usage ==
The park contains over 50 official huts and bivouac shelters (bivvies), forming one of the most extensive backcountry hut networks in New Zealand. These shelters vary greatly in size and facilities, ranging from small two-bunk bivvies tucked into remote alpine valleys to large serviced lodges with 28 bunks designed for high-use tracks. Huts are categorised by the Department of Conservation (DOC) as 'Serviced Huts', 'Standard Huts', or 'Basic Huts/Bivvies'. The introduction to A Guide to New Zealand's Best Backcountry Huts (2016) includes this observation:

But huts aren't just about shelter. They are also places where people celebrate life events, meet friends and introduce kids to the hills. They provide a base for fishing, hunting, tramping and climbing. They offer handy refuges for those doing biodiversity work.

According to DOC visitor research, Tararua Forest Park attracts approximately 152,000 visitors annually, with around 130,000 originating from the Wellington region. The majority of these visitors tramp or camp around the park. DOC manages over 30 huts and bivvies in the park, supporting a range of tramping experiences from day trips to multi-day crossings such as the Holdsworth-Jumbo, and the Southern Crossing. Routine maintenance of huts and community engagement are supported by volunteer tramping clubs, who organize working bees and foster stewardship of the huts.

== Huts and bivvies ==
Hut name	Hut category	Main access point	Notes	Reference
Holdsworth Lodge	Serviced Hut (28 bunks)	Holdsworth road end	Popular starting point for many different tramps.	
Powell Hut	Serviced Hut (32 bunks)	Holdsworth road end	Offers panoramic views of the Tararua Range.	
Jumbo Hut	Serviced Hut (20 bunks)	Holdsworth road end	Spacious hut with scenic surroundings.	
Atiwhakatu Hut	Standard Hut (26 bunks)	Holdsworth road end	Near the Atiwhakatu Stream, suitable for families.	
Totara Flats Hut	Serviced Hut (28 bunks)	Waiohine Gorge	Large hut on grassy flats beside the Waiohine River.	
Mid Waiohine Hut	Standard Hut (6 bunks)	Waiohine Gorge	Located near the Waiohine River swingbridge	
Neill Forks Hut	Standard Hut (6 bunks)	Waiohine Gorge	Located beside Hector River.	
Dorset Ridge Hut	Standard Hut (6 bunks)	Waiohine Gorge	Remote, High-level hut with views over Waiohine Valley.	
Carkeek Hut	Standard Hut (6 bunks)	Waiohine Gorge	Remote hut named after early settler William Carkeek.	
Cone Hut	Standard Hut (5 bunks)	Waiohine Gorge	Historic slab hut, second-oldest in Tararuas.	
Winchcombe Bivvy	Basic Bivvy (2 bunks)	Waiohine Gorge	2-bunk bivvy built 2021; maintained by volunteers.	
Parawai Lodge	Standard Hut (18 bunks)	Ōtaki Forks	Situated in a clearing at Ōtaki Forks, Popular with families.	
Field Hut	Standard Hut (20 bunks)	Ōtaki Forks	Oldest purpose-built tramping hut in New Zealand (built 1924).	
Kime Hut	Standard Hut (20 bunks)	Ōtaki Forks	Alpine hut at 1400 m, often used on Southern Crossing.	
Waitewaewae Hut	Standard Hut (16 bunks)	Ōtaki Forks	Known as YTYY, sits by Ōtaki River; popular overnighter.	
Penn Creek Hut	Standard Hut (6 bunks)	Ōtaki Forks	Popular with hunters, beside Penn Creek, less visited due to steep access.	
Anderson Memorial Hut	Standard Hut (6 bunks)	Ōtaki Forks	On slopes of Mt Crawford, popular Main Range stop.	
Aokaparangi Hut	Basic Hut (2 bunks)	Ōtaki Forks	Small hut on Main Range circuit, seldom visited.	
Waiotauru Hut	Basic Hut (4 bunks)	Ōtaki Forks	Beside Waiotauru River, with good swimming holes nearby.	
Waiopehu Hut	Standard Hut (18 bunks)	Poads Road	Above bushline; offers expansive views across Horowhenua	
Te Matawai Hut	Standard Hut (18 bunks)	Poads Road	Below bushline; common stop before heading to Main Range	
South Ohau Hut	Standard Hut (10 bunks)	Poads Road	On a terrace just above the Ohau River	
North Ohau Hut	Basic Hut (4 bunks)	Poads Road	Beside the Ohau River; requires good navigation, no formed tracks	
Dracophyllum Hut	Basic Hut (2 bunks)	Poads Road	Located below Dracophyllum Knob; part of the Main Range hut network	
Roaring Stag Lodge	Standard Hut (12 bunks)	Putara Road	Beside the Ruamāhanga River; popular family tramp	
Herepai Hut	Standard Hut (10 bunks)	Putara Road	Good overnighter above bushline near Herepai Peak	
Cattle Ridge Hut	Standard Hut (5 bunks)	Putara Road	Small hut above bushline with views to Eketāhuna	
Dundas Hut	Standard Hut (6 bunks)	Putara Road	Near Dundas Peak; sometimes used by hunters	
Arete Hut	Basic Hut (2 bunks)	Mangahao Valley	Situated near Arete Peak; offers panoramic views; part of the Main Range hut network	
Mangahao Flats Hut	Standard Hut (16 bunks)	Mangahao Valley	Sits beside the Mangahao River	
Burn Hut	Basic Hut (6 bunks)	Mangahao Valley	Sits above the bushline offering expansive views	
North Mangahao Bivvy	Basic Bivvy (2 bunks)	Mangahao Valley	Remote 2-bunk bivvy; no marked track, strong navigation skills required	
Mitre Flats Hut	Standard Hut (14 bunks)	Waingawa Road	Base for those summiting Mitre	
Cow Creek Hut	Standard Hut (6 bunks)	Waingawa Road	Sits beside the Cow Creek - Waingawa Forks	
Tarn Ridge Hut	Standard Hut (16 bunks)	Waingawa Road	In storm-damaged condition as at 2025	
Mid King Bivvy	Basic Bivvy (2 bunks)	Waingawa Road	Remote 2-bunk bivvy; no formed track(s)	
McGregor Bivvy	Basic Bivvy (2 bunks)	Waingawa Road	Very remote 2-bunk bivvy; no formed access track	
Renata Hut	Basic Hut (6 bunks)	Akatarawa Saddle	Historic hut, suitable for older children	
Elder Hut	Standard Hut (4 bunks)	Akatarawa Saddle	Sub-alpine hut with views over the Waiotauru Valley	
Kapakapanui Hut	Standard Hut (6 bunks)	Ngatiawa Road	Popular route, offers views across Waikanae	
Blue Range Hut	Standard Hut (4 bunks)	Kiriwhakapapa Road	Small 4-bunk hut, short climb from Kiriwhakapapa	
Sayer Hut	Standard Hut (6 bunks)	Mangatarere Valley Road	Historic 6-bunk hut, multiple river crossings to access	
Alpha Hut	Standard Hut (20 bunks)	Kaitoke or Waiohine Gorge	Popular hut on Southern Crossing Route	
Tutuwai Hut	Standard Hut (20 bunks)	Kaitoke or Waiohine Gorge	Sits near the Tauwharenīkau River; popular overnighter for older children.	
Arete Forks Hut	Standard Hut (6 bunks)	Kiriwhakapapa or Waingawa Road	Popular with hunters, not often visited	
Nichols Hut	Standard Hut (6 bunks)	Ōtaki Forks or Poads Road	Sits below Mt Crawford in the sub-alpine zone; commonly used on Main Range tramps	
Maungahuka Hut	Standard Hut (10 bunks)	Ōtaki Forks or Waiohine Gorge	High altitude hut situated beside a large alpine alpine tarn with expansive views	

== Gallery ==
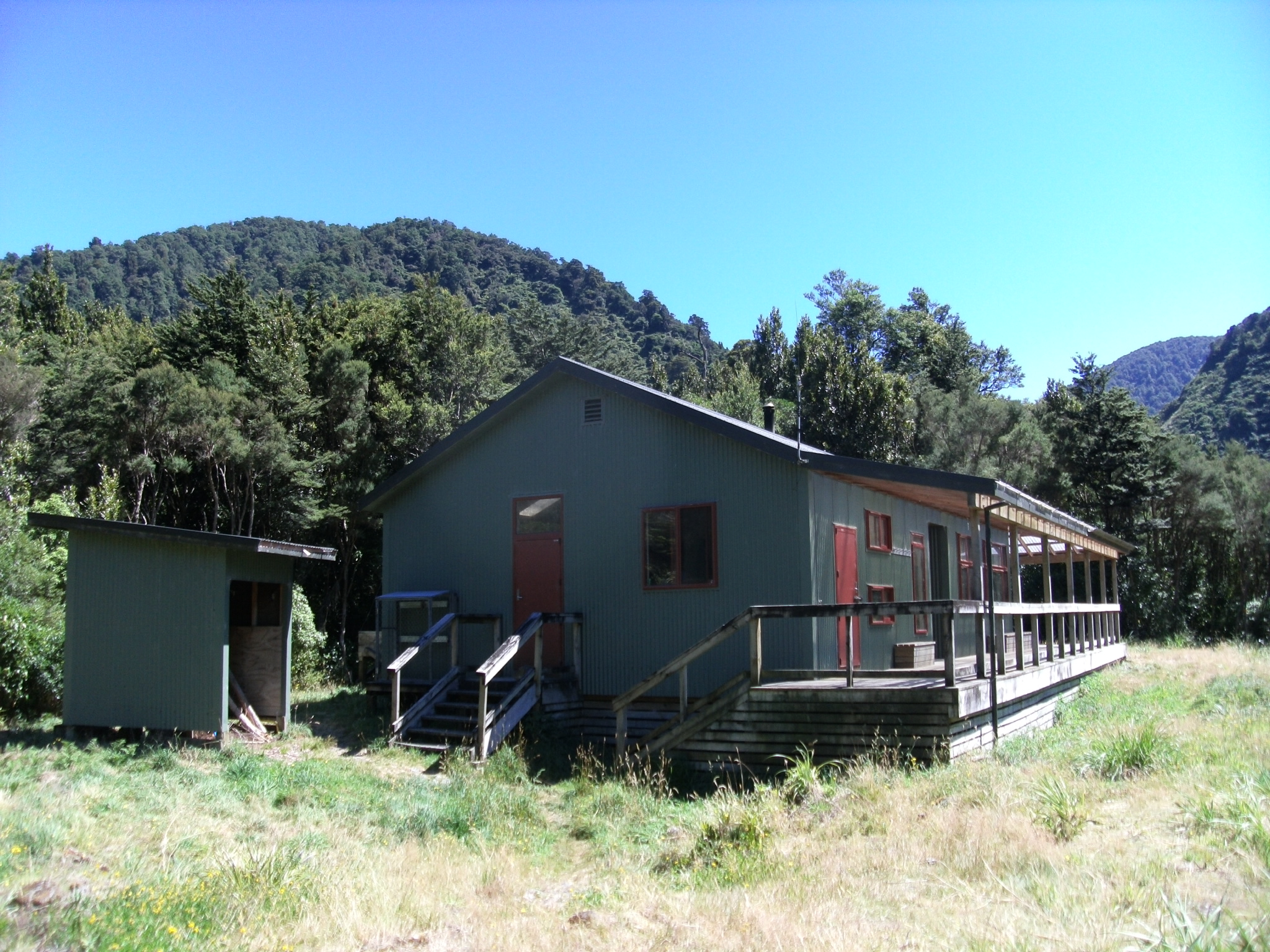
Totara Flats Hut

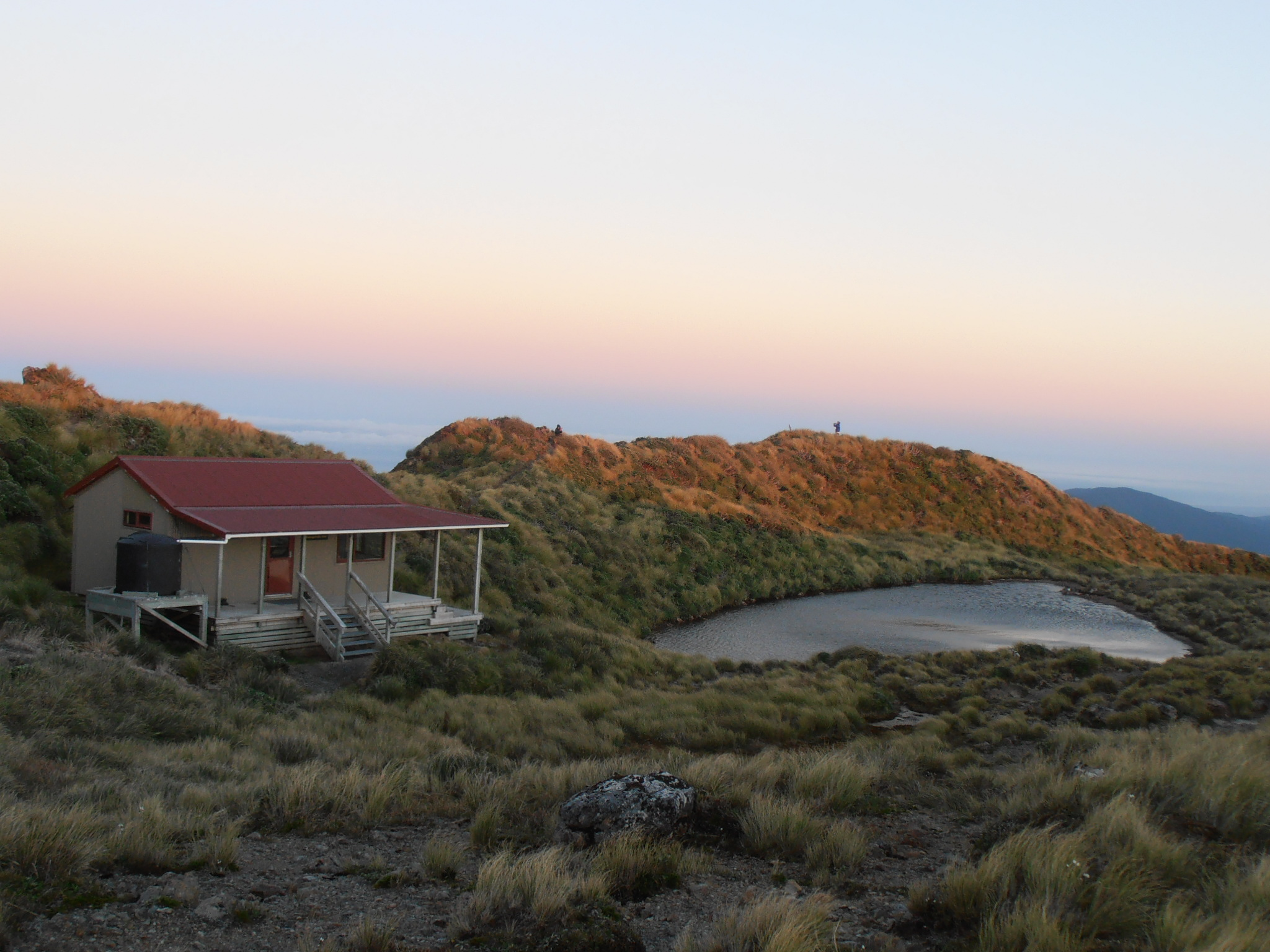
Maungahuka Hut at sunrise

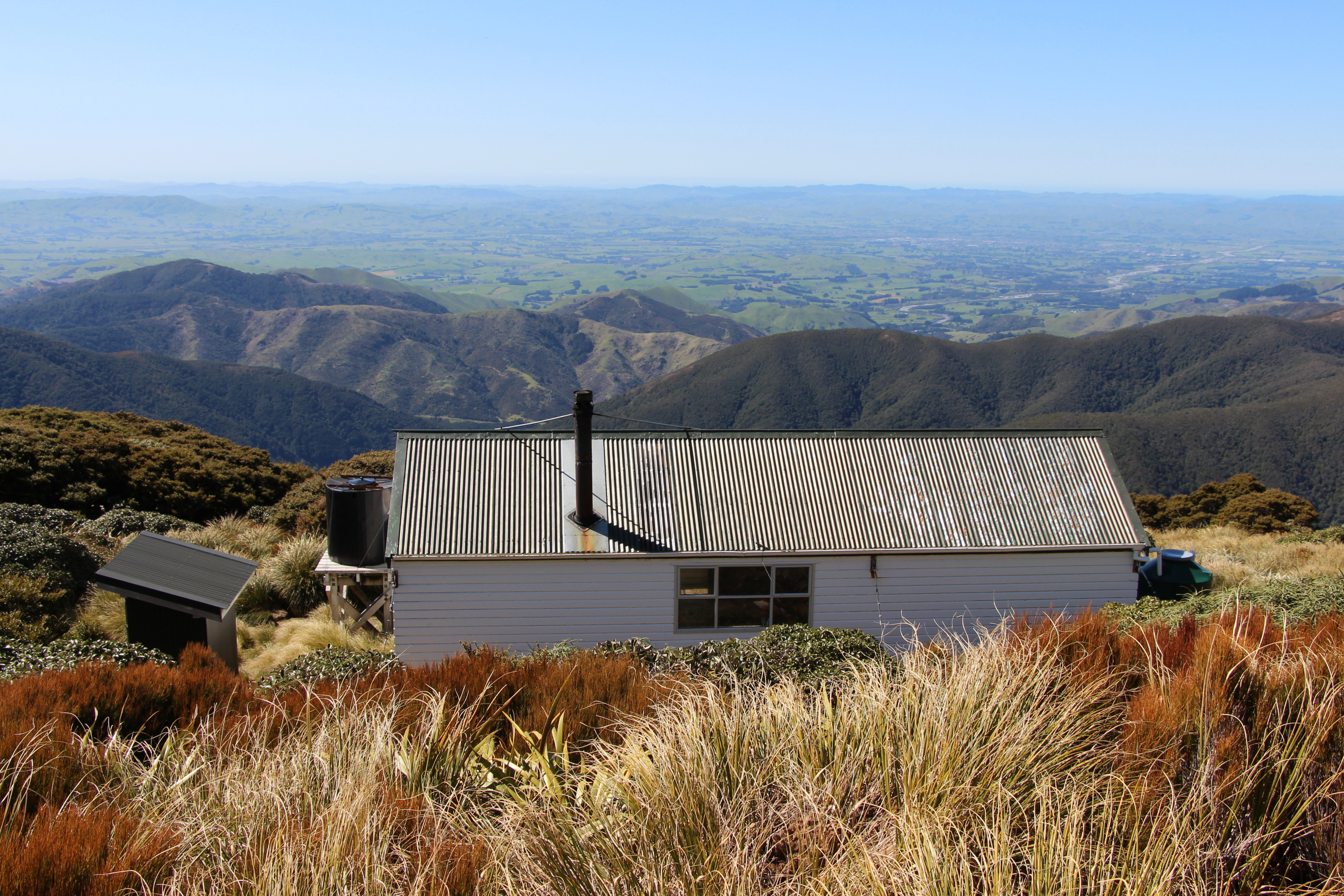
The view from Jumbo Hut

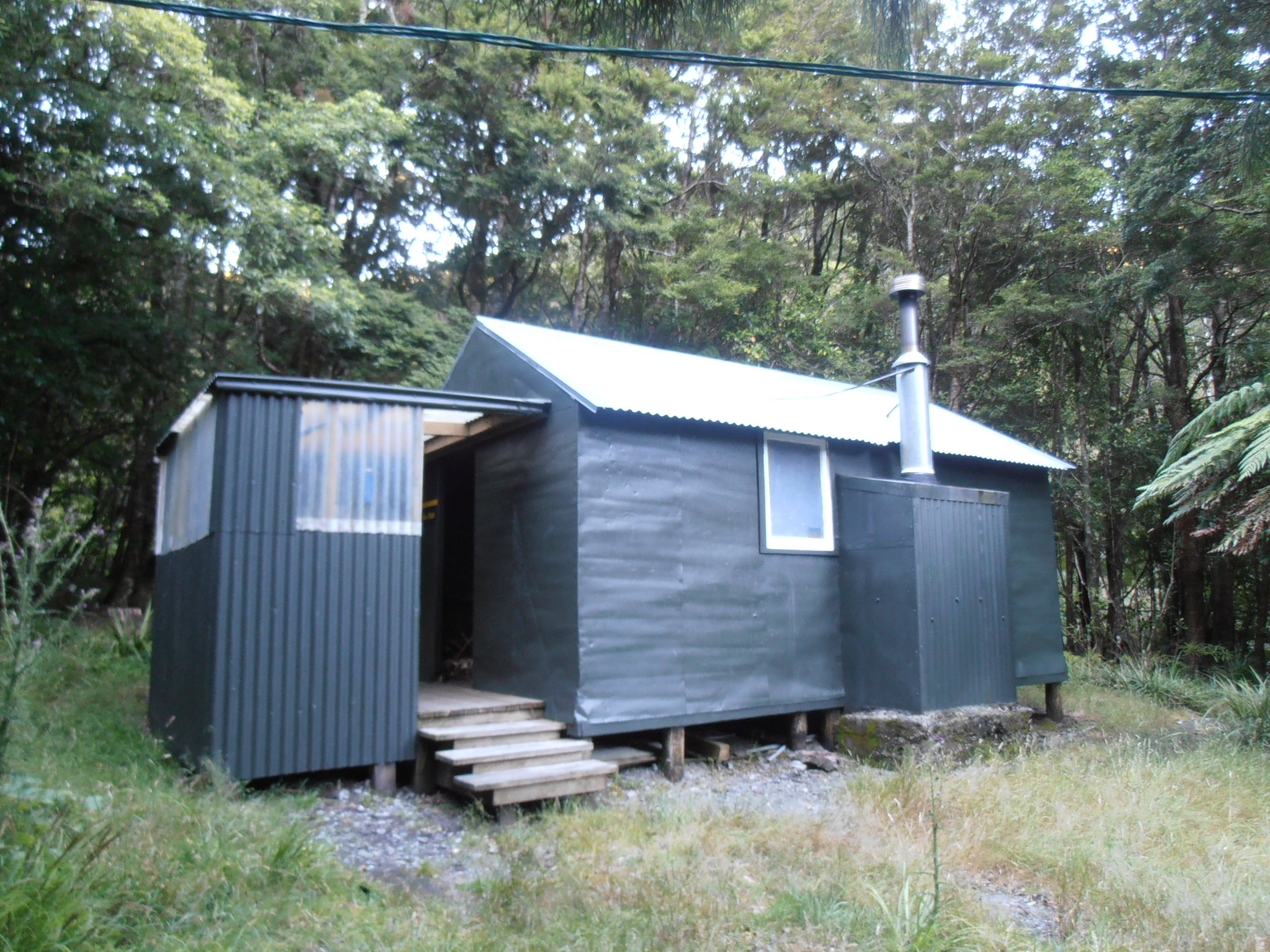
Neill Forks Hut

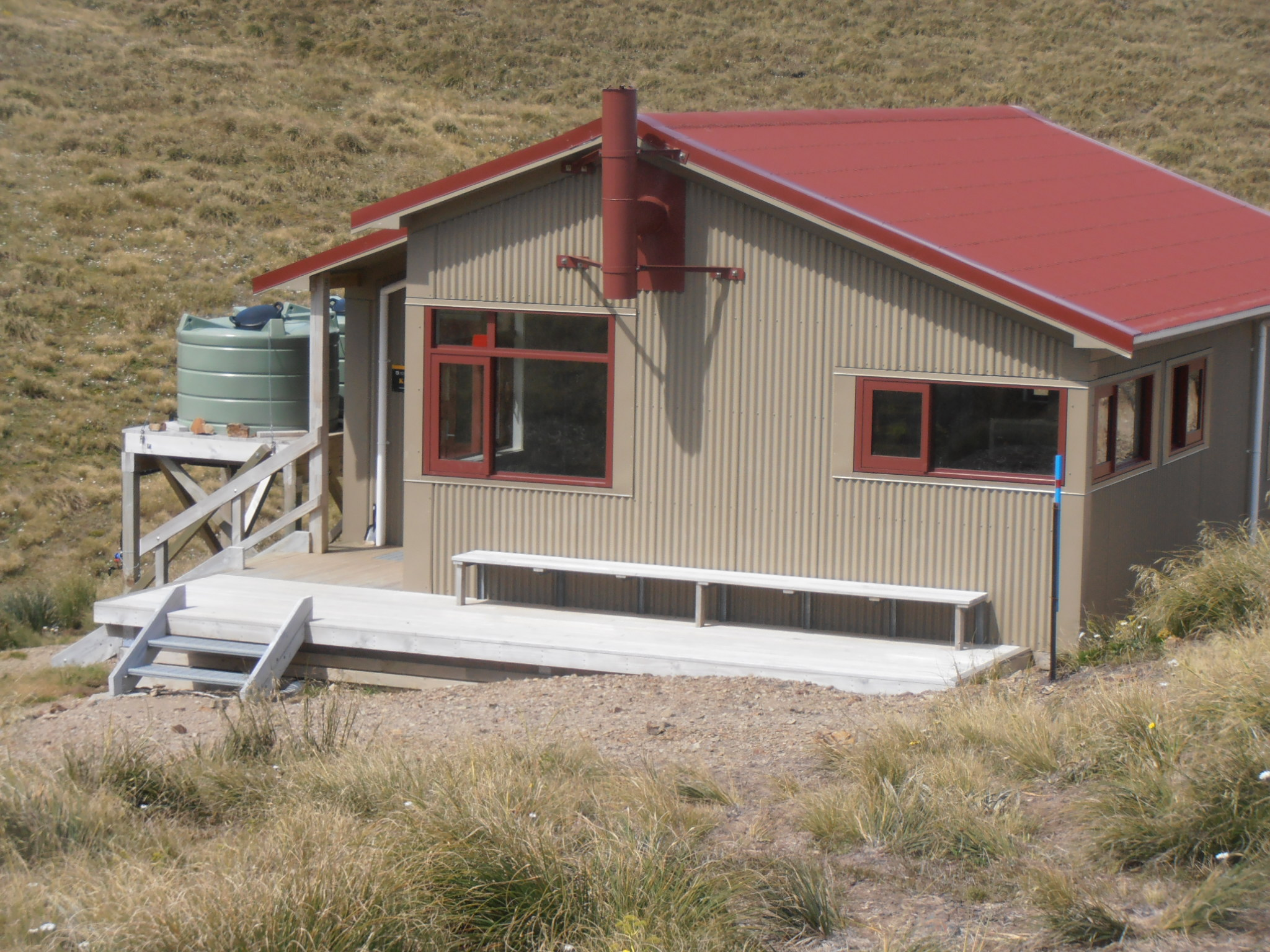
Kime Hut in summer

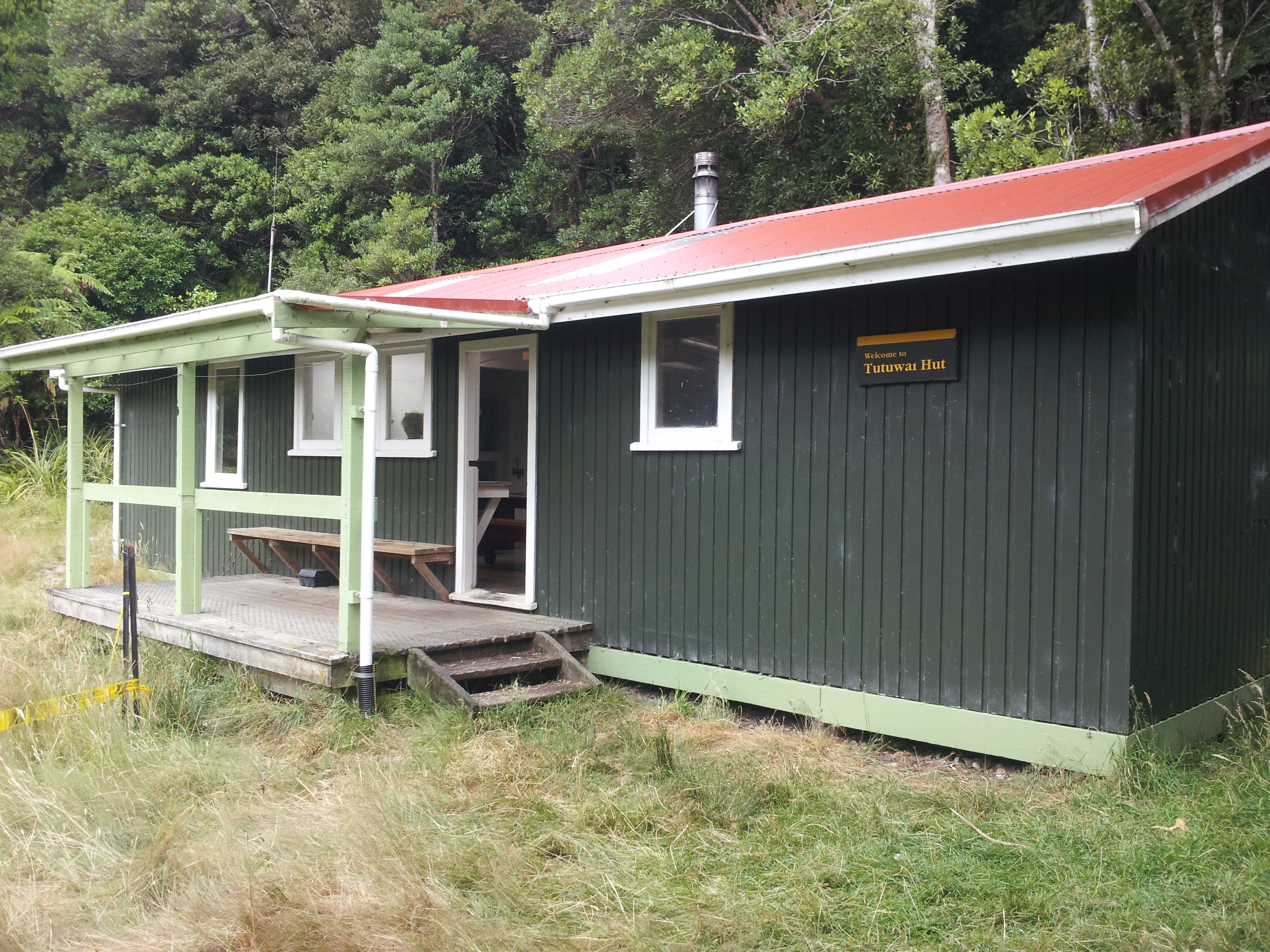
Tutuwai Hut, in summer

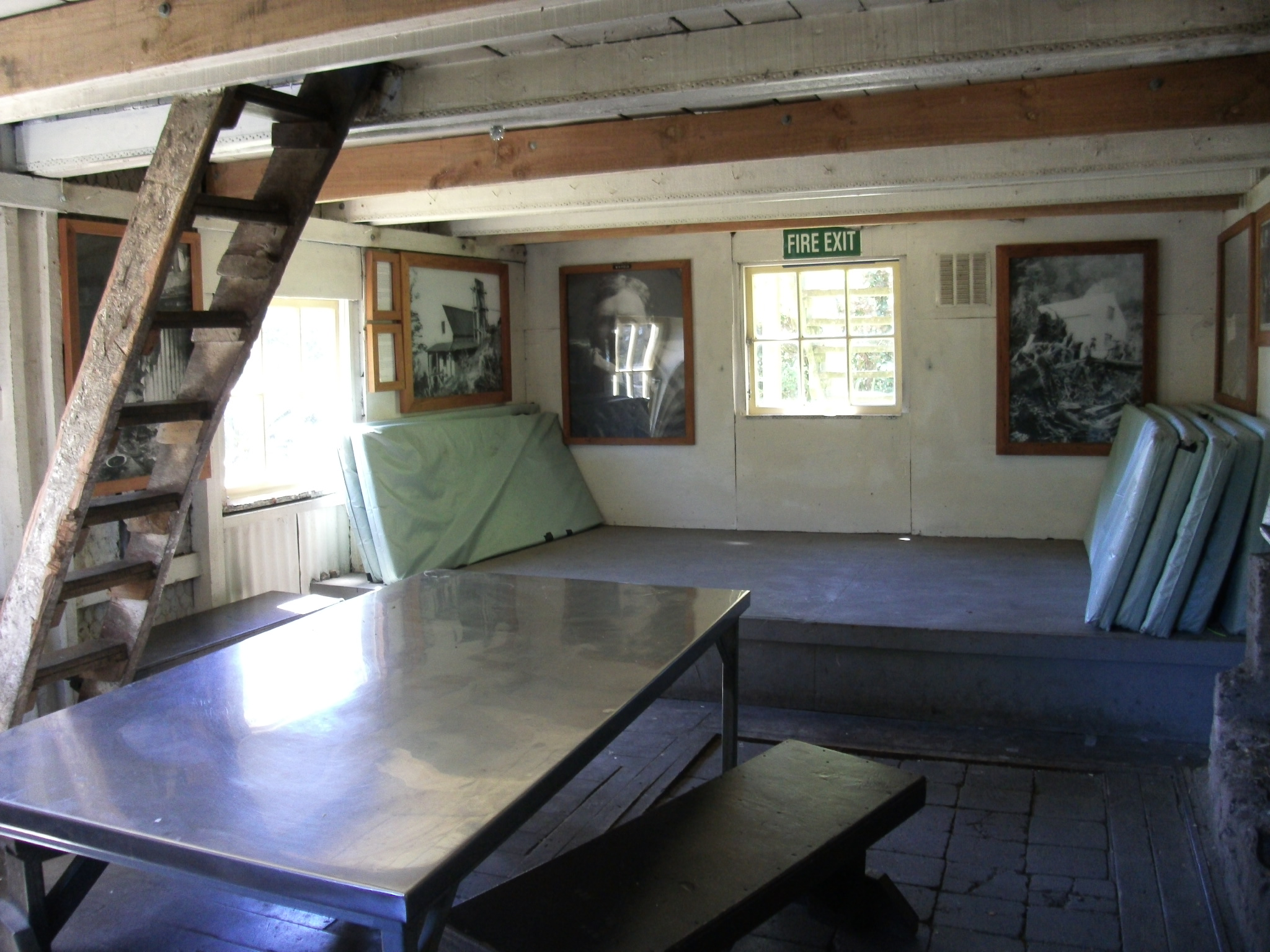
Downstairs interior of historic Field Hut built 1924

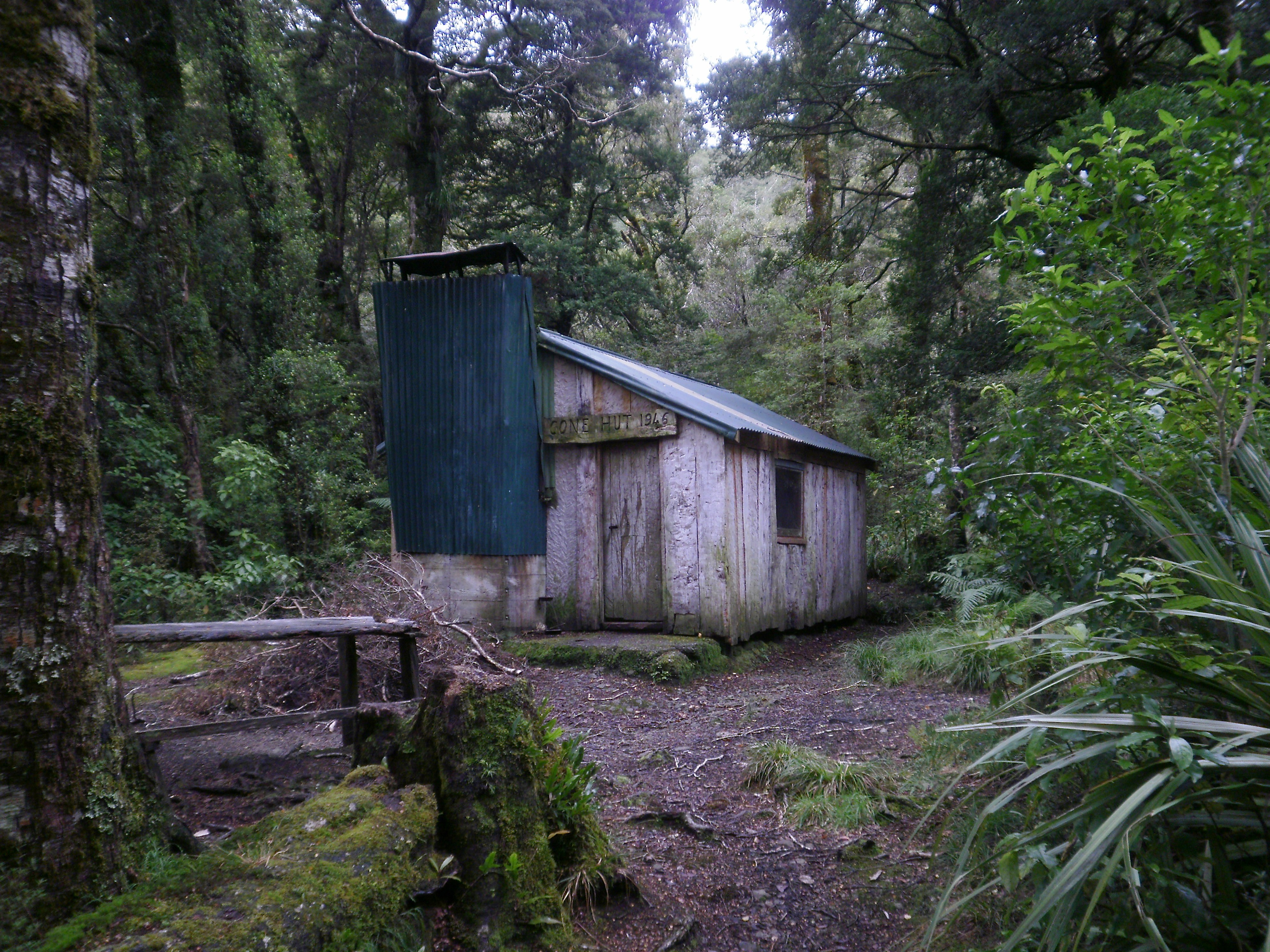
Historic Cone Hut, built 1946
