= Waiotauru River =

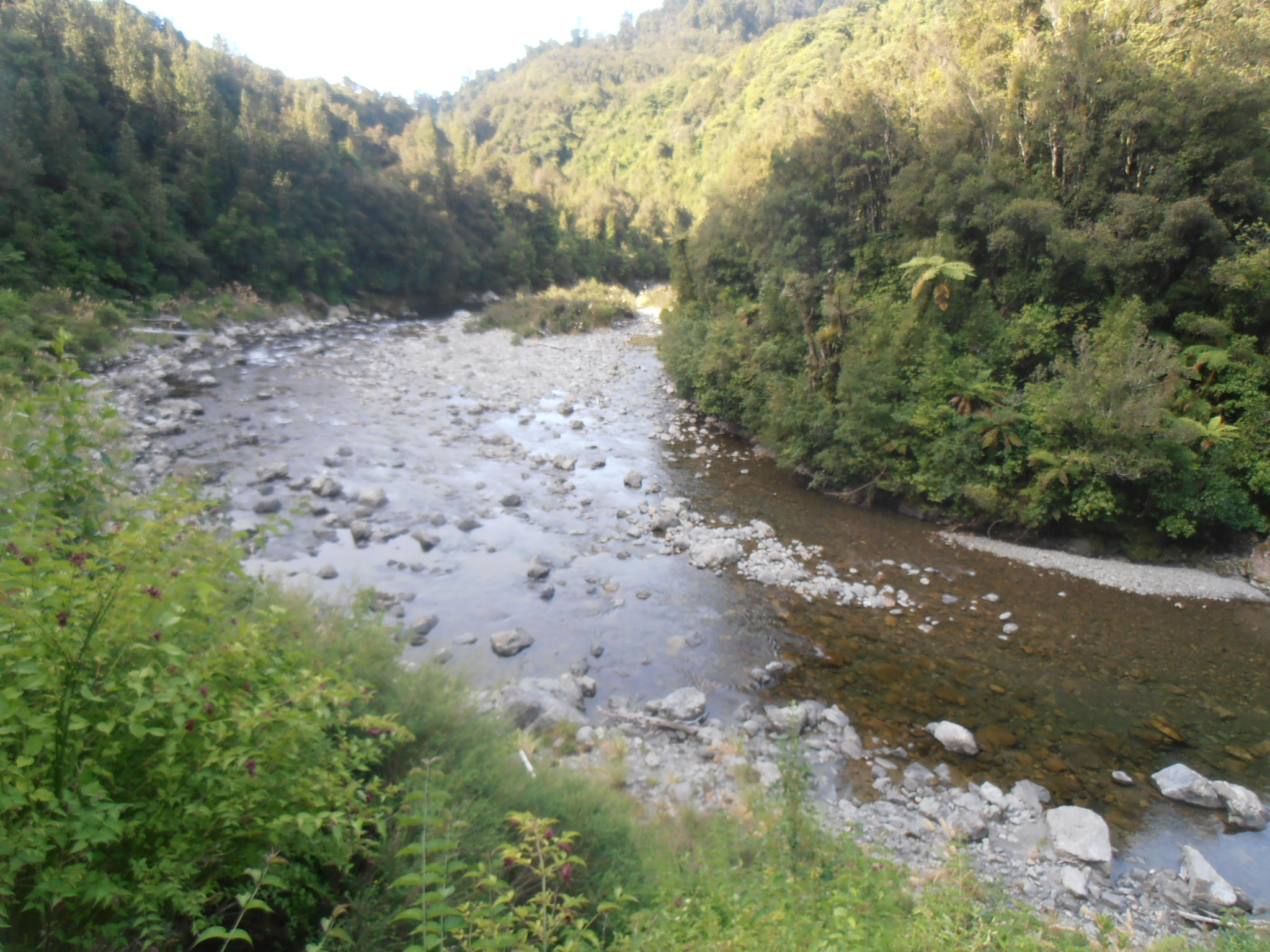
- Waiotauru River seen from the Waiotauru Track
- Route of the Waiotauru River
- Mouth of the Waiotauru River Waiotauru River (North Island)

Location
- Country: New Zealand

Physical characteristics
- Source: Eastern Waiotauru / Snowy River
  - location: Mount Hector, Tararua Range
  - coordinates: 40.95248°S 175.28032°E
- 2nd source: Southern Waiotauru River
  - location: Renata, Renata Ridge, Tararua Range
  - coordinates: 40.97457°S 175.19584°E
- Mouth
  - location: Ōtaki River
  - coordinates: 40°52′08″S 175°14′06″E
- Length: 16.6 km (10 mi)

Basin features
- Progression: Waiotauru River → Ōtaki River → South Taranaki Bight → Tasman Sea
- Landmarks: Tararua Forest Park
- Tributaries
  - right: Tregear Creek (eastern), Sheridan Creek

The Waiotauru River is a river of the Wellington Region of New Zealand's North Island. It flows generally north from two branches, the Waiotauru River (or Southern Waiotauru) and the Eastern Waiotauru (or Snowy) River. Both of these branches have their origins in the southwestern Tararua Range, with the Eastern branch having its origin on the slopes of Mount Hector, and the Southern on Renata. The Waiotauru meets the Ōtaki River at Ōtaki Forks, 16.6 kilometres (10 mi) southeast of Ōtaki.

== See also ==
- List of rivers of Wellington Region
- List of rivers of New Zealand
