= Waitewaewae River =

Location
- Country: New Zealand

Physical characteristics
- Source: West Waitewaewae River
  - location: Waitewaewae, Tararua Range
  - coordinates: 40.75284°S 175.29618°E
  - elevation: 880m
- 2nd source: East Waitewaewae River
  - location: Tararua Range
  - coordinates: 40.75061°S 175.30927°E
  - elevation: 875m
- Mouth
  - location: Ōtaki River
  - coordinates: 37°56′35″S 177°00′34″E
  - elevation: 305m
- Length: 5 km (3 mi)

Basin features
- Progression: Waitewaewae River → Ōtaki River → South Taranaki Bight → Tasman Sea
- Landmarks: Tararua Forest Park
- Tributaries
  - left: Prout Stream (west),
  - right: Mick Stream (west), Chaney Creek, Boyd-Wilson Creek

The Waitewaewae River is a short river of the Wellington Region of New Zealand's North Island. An upper tributary of the Ōtaki River, it flows south through Tararua Forest Park to reach its confluence with the Ōtaki River 15 kilometres (9.3 mi) east of Ōtaki. The river splits near Island Forks into two major tributaries: the West Waitewaewae River and the East Waitewaewae River, both of which flow from different sides of the Waitewaewae highpoint (939m).

== See also ==
- List of rivers of Wellington Region
- List of rivers of New Zealand
