= Seddon Bennington =

New Zealand museum executive

Seddon Leonard Bennington (8 October 1947 – c. 11 July 2009) was a New Zealand museum executive. Bennington was the chief executive of the Museum of New Zealand Te Papa Tongarewa, the national museum of New Zealand, from January 2003 until his death in 2009, and had also been the director of the Carnegie Science Center in Pittsburgh, Pennsylvania, from 1994 until 2002.

== Biography ==
=== Early life ===
Bennington was born in Hanmer Springs, North Canterbury, on the South Island of New Zealand. His parents, Charles and Lillian Jean Bennington, reportedly named him after the former New Zealand Prime Minister Richard Seddon, whom they admired for his efforts to benefit working class New Zealanders.

Bennington attended Hanmer Springs Primary School, Culverden District High School and Shirley Boys' High School. He credited a teacher at Culverden with introducing him to biology, his favourite subject. An art teacher also took him and other students on a birdwatching trip to Kapiti Island when he was in seventh grade, and the trip left him with a lifelong appreciation for art and nature.

Bennington joined the Volunteer Service Abroad in Western Samoa in 1966. He then returned to New Zealand to study across the arts and sciences, and during this time also worked as a teacher.

He obtained his doctorate in zoology from the University of Canterbury, and also studied a variety of subjects, including New Zealand history, Māori studies, art history and anthropology.

Bennington had two sons.

=== Early career ===
Bennington was appointed the head of the Otago Early Settlers' Museum in Dunedin, and then director of the Wellington City Art Gallery, early in his career. He went on to be the head of both the Scitech Discovery Centre in Perth, Australia, and the Division of Professional Services at the Western Australian Museum. He wrote a book entitled Handbook for Small Museums while living and working in Australia.

=== Kamin Science Center ===
Bennington became the director of the Kamin Science Center, formerly the Carnegie Science Center, in Pittsburgh in 1994. He is credited with reviving the science centre and making the institution financially stable.

Bennington joined the Kamin Science Center at the height of the museum's financial and attendance problems. The museum, which opened a new building in Pittsburgh's North Side in 1991, was suffering from budget deficits and a wavering mission since its opening three years before his arrival. He quickly moved to establish a new vision and mission for the Carnegie Science Center. Much of his strategy centered on the establishment and maintenance of institutional relationships between the Science Center and other cultural, scientific and business organizations. He introduced travelling exhibits to the museum, especially through the former UPMC SportsWorks complex.

Bennington became a fixture within Pittsburgh's cultural and artistic communities during his nine-year tenure as director of the museum, and volunteered with the city's theatre and art groups.

The reforms which he brought to the center proved popular with the general public and it became the most popular museum of the four Carnegie Museums of Pittsburgh during his term as director, and continued to be the most visited museum of the Carnegie system in July 2009.

Bennington left the Carnegie Science Museum in late 2002 to become director the Museum of New Zealand Te Papa Tongarewa.

=== Te Papa ===
Bennington sought to emphasise and redefine Te Papa's strengths to the public during his six years as the museum's head. He worked with staff to create exhibits which would grab the audience's attention saying, "I want our exhibitions to be richer in things and richer in information."

One of the highlights of his tenure was the opening of the "Monet and the Impressionists" exhibition at Te Papa in early 2009. The travelling exhibit, featuring Monet's masterpieces, arrived at Te Papa following two years of negotiations with the Museum of Fine Arts in Boston, Massachusetts. Bennington noted at the time, "It's the most significant collection of works by Monet that will ever have come to New Zealand or Australia. It's certainly the most valuable exhibition that has come to New Zealand."

== Death ==
Bennington and a long-time family friend, Marcella Jackson, 54, disappeared while tramping in the Tararua Range on the North Island of New Zealand on 11 July 2009. Authorities were alerted after they failed to return from a weekend of tramping.

They had planned to hike from Otaki Forks to Kime Hut within the Tararua Range, but were caught in a sudden winter southerly storm on Saturday, 11 July, on an exposed section of the Tararuas. Their bodies were recovered on 15 July 2009, four days after they went missing. Both had died from hypothermia. Bennington was 61 years old.

=== Memorial service ===
A memorial service and funeral for Bennington was held at Te Papa. His body was taken to Te Papa's marae on 21 July 2009. Bennington's family members carried his coffin to the entrance of the marae, where it was given to Te Papa staff members who carried it up the stairs accompanied by Māori instrumental music and conch shells. His casket was then returned to his family at the top of the stairs, to be carried onto the marae. Bennington's coffin was greeted by Te Papa's staff with a haka, and was then placed on a stage in the center of the marae and covered with three kahu kiwi (kiwi feather coats) as a sign of respect. One of the kiwi cloaks had been used for the tangi, or funeral, of the former prime minister, Richard Seddon, in 1906. The cloak was significant not only because Bennington was named after the Prime Minister, but also because Bennington had personally accepted the cloak from the Seddon family as a donation to Te Papa. The second cloak was originally from Tuhoe, where Bennington spent time during his younger years. The third kiwi cloak used to cover Bennington's coffin had been used previously to repatriate the remains of New Zealanders who died abroad back to their homeland.
