= Ōtaki Beach =

Settlement in Wellington Region, New Zealand

Ōtaki Beach Te Takutai o Ōtaki (Māori)
- Rural settlement
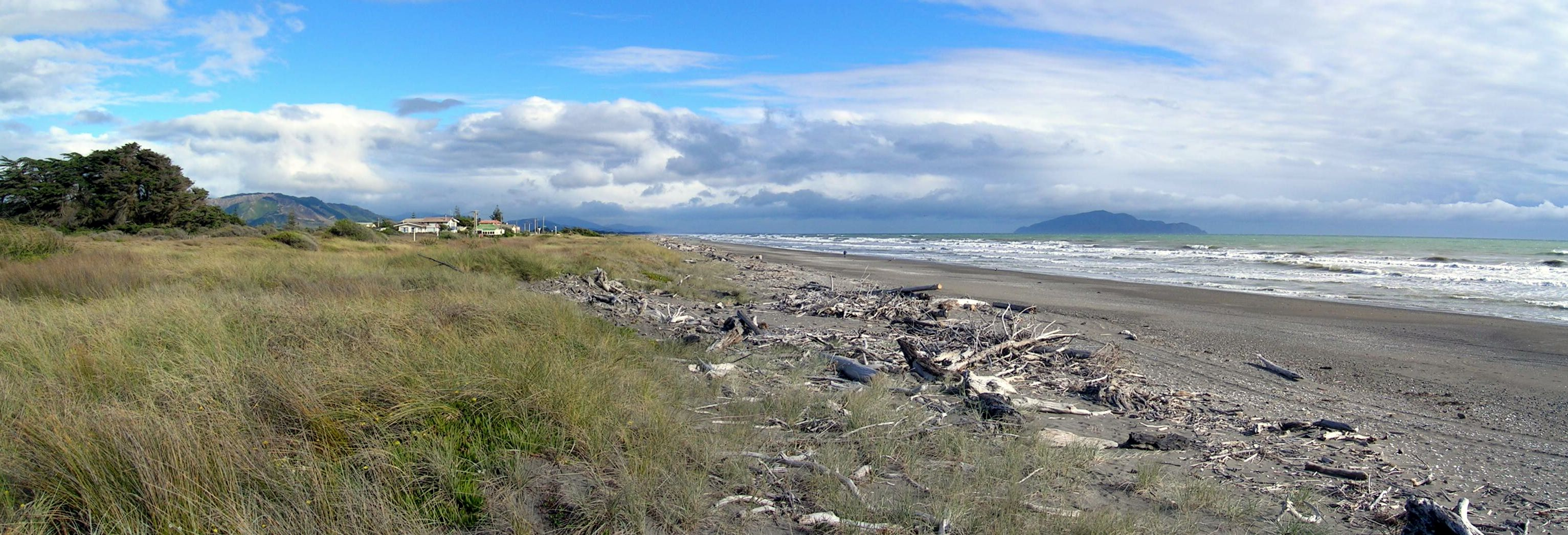
- Ōtaki beach
- Interactive map of Ōtaki Beach
- Coordinates: 40.743°S 175.119°E
- Country: New Zealand
- Region: Wellington Region
- Territorial authority: Kāpiti Coast District
- Ward: Ōtaki Ward
- Community: Ōtaki Community
- Established: 1920s
- Electorates: Kapiti; Te Tai Hauāuru (Māori)

Government
  - Territorial Authority: Kāpiti Coast District Council
  - Regional council: Greater Wellington Regional Council
  - Kāpiti Coast Mayor: Janet Holborow
  - Kapiti MP: Tim Costley
  - Te Tai Hauāuru MP: Debbie Ngarewa-Packer

Area
  - Total: 3.36 km^{2} (1.30 sq mi)

Population (June 2025)
  - Total: 2,230
  - Density: 664/km^{2} (1,720/sq mi)
- Postal code: 5512
- Area code: 06
- Website: https://www.visitkapiti.co.nz/see-and-do/beaches/otaki-beach/

Ōtaki Beach is a small settlement in the Kāpiti Coast District of the Wellington Region of New Zealand's North Island. It is located on the South Taranaki Bight north of the mouth of Ōtaki River, and south of the mouth of the Waitohu Stream 4.0 kilometres northwest of Ōtaki.

A cairn opposite 224 Marine Parade commemorates the shipwrecks of Felixstowe, a barque, and City of Auckland, a full-rigged ship carrying immigrants, in October 1878. Shipwrecks were common on Ōtaki beach in the 19th century.

The area was divided into residential sections and roads built in the early 1920s.

== Demographics ==
Ōtaki Beach is described by Stats NZ as a small urban area, which covers 3.36 km^{2} (1.30 sq mi). It had an estimated population of 2,230 as of June 2025, with a population density of 664 people per km^{2}.

Historical population
Year	Pop.	±% p.a.
2006	1,689	—
2013	1,620	−0.59%
2018	1,818	+2.33%
2023	2,145	+3.36%

Ōtaki Beach had a population of 2,145 in the 2023 New Zealand census, an increase of 327 people (18.0%) since the 2018 census, and an increase of 525 people (32.4%) since the 2013 census. There were 1,029 males, 1,113 females, and 3 people of other genders in 942 dwellings. 4.5% of people identified as LGBTIQ+. The median age was 46.0 years (compared with 38.1 years nationally). There were 369 people (17.2%) aged under 15 years, 333 (15.5%) aged 15 to 29, 930 (43.4%) aged 30 to 64, and 513 (23.9%) aged 65 or older.

People could identify as more than one ethnicity. The results were 76.4% European (Pākehā); 37.1% Māori; 5.0% Pasifika; 3.5% Asian; 0.8% Middle Eastern, Latin American and African New Zealanders (MELAA); and 2.5% other, which includes people giving their ethnicity as "New Zealander". English was spoken by 96.9%, Māori by 19.6%, Samoan by 0.3%, and other languages by 5.7%. No language could be spoken by 2.2% (e.g. too young to talk). New Zealand Sign Language was known by 0.3%. The percentage of people born overseas was 14.7, compared with 28.8% nationally.

Religious affiliations were 27.0% Christian, 0.3% Hindu, 0.1% Islam, 2.4% Māori religious beliefs, 0.7% Buddhist, 0.8% New Age, 0.1% Jewish, and 0.8% other religions. People who answered that they had no religion were 59.3%, and 9.1% of people did not answer the census question.

Of those at least 15 years old, 429 (24.2%) people had a bachelor's or higher degree, 975 (54.9%) had a post-high school certificate or diploma, and 375 (21.1%) people exclusively held high school qualifications. The median income was $35,700, compared with $41,500 nationally. 159 people (9.0%) earned over $100,000 compared to 12.1% nationally. The employment status of those at least 15 was 714 (40.2%) full-time, 276 (15.5%) part-time, and 66 (3.7%) unemployed.
