= Divorce in New Zealand =

In New Zealand, Parliament has exclusive jurisdiction to regulate the law of marriage and divorce. The Family Proceedings Act 1980 governs divorce in New Zealand.

== History of divorce law in New Zealand ==
=== Prior to 1867 ===
Divorce allowing remarriage could only be obtained through a private act of Parliament in the United Kingdom.

=== 1867 ===
The Divorce and Matrimonial Causes Act 1867 was passed. This act was virtually identical to the equivalent law passed in England in 1857. Judgement on divorce proceedings was transferred from Parliament to the courts. A husband could divorce his wife on the grounds of her adultery but a husband's adultery was not of itself sufficient grounds for divorce. A wife also had to prove some other ground such as cruelty, desertion or bigamy. All cases had to be heard before three judges in Wellington.

=== 1881 ===
The Divorce and Matrimonial Causes Act 1867 Amendment Act 1881 was passed enabling petitions to be heard by a Judge sitting alone.

=== 1898 ===
The Divorce Act 1898 was passed. The women's suffrage movement had advocated for the law change but many church groups vehemently opposed it.

Either party could petition for a divorce on any of the following grounds which were based on the concept of matrimonial fault:

- Adultery.
- Desertion for five years.
- Habitual drunkenness for four years coupled with failure to maintain and cruelty.
- Imprisonment for seven years or more for attempted murder of the petitioner.

=== 1907 ===
The Divorce and Matrimonial Causes Amendment Act 1907 was passed. It removed the grounds for divorce based on non-compliance with an order requiring the restitution of conjugal rights (ORCR) and added further grounds for divorce. These included:

- where a spouse was of unsound mind and had been confined in an asylum for ten of the previous 12 years
- where a spouse had been convicted of murdering a child of the marriage.

=== 1912 ===
The Divorce and Matrimonial Causes Amendment Act 1912 was passed. Grounds for divorce based on the respondent's unsound mind were shortened to 7 out of 10 years.

=== 1920 ===
The Divorce and Matrimonial Causes Amendment Act 1920 substantially amended the grounds for divorce to include:

- Separation (by decree of separation, separation by agreement or mutual consent) for three years.
- Reinstatement of failure to comply with ORCR
- Seven or more years imprisonment for wounding spouse or a child of the marriage.

=== 1922 ===
The Divorce and Matrimonial Causes Amendment Act 1921–1922 was passed. The law was amended so that if the innocent party objected to the discretionary decision of three years separation, the case was dismissed.

=== 1953 ===
The Divorce and Matrimonial Causes Amendment Act 1953 was passed.

The main changes in the act were to:

- abolish failure to comply with an ORCR as grounds for divorce
- extend the three-year period of separation to seven years continuous separation with little likelihood of reconciliation.
- enable a petition to be dismissed if the respondent could prove that the petitioner's wrongful conduct caused the separation.

=== 1963 ===
The Matrimonial Proceedings Act 1963 was passed. Two minor new grounds for divorce were added.

=== 1968 ===
The Matrimonial Proceedings Amendment Act 1968 was passed. This act:

- reduced the waiting period for establishing grounds for desertion, separation and drunkenness from three to two years.
- reduced the period for living apart from seven to four years.

== Current divorce law ==
The Family Proceedings Act 1980 came into effect on 1 October 1981 and removed divorce from the High Court to the newly created Family Court. From that date, for legal purposes, the term divorce became 'dissolution of marriage ', for which application had to be made to the Family Court. Under the act, an application for dissolution on the grounds that the marriage has broken down irreconcilably may be joint or made by either the husband or wife, provided they can satisfy the two-year separation requirement.

== See also ==
- Emily McWilliam – the first woman to be granted a divorce under New Zealand domestic law
