= Emily McWilliam =

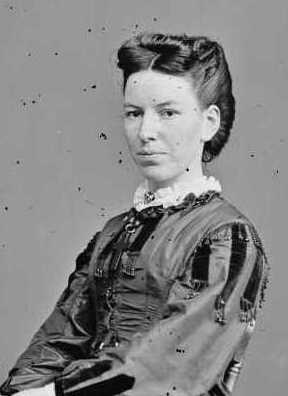
McWilliam between 1870 and 1889

Emily Anna McWilliam (née Canty or Cauty; 1840–1899) was the first woman to be granted a divorce under New Zealand domestic law. She was noted for her community work as a nurse, practitioner of homeopathy and fundraiser for the Otaki cottage hospital. A public clock was erected in her memory.

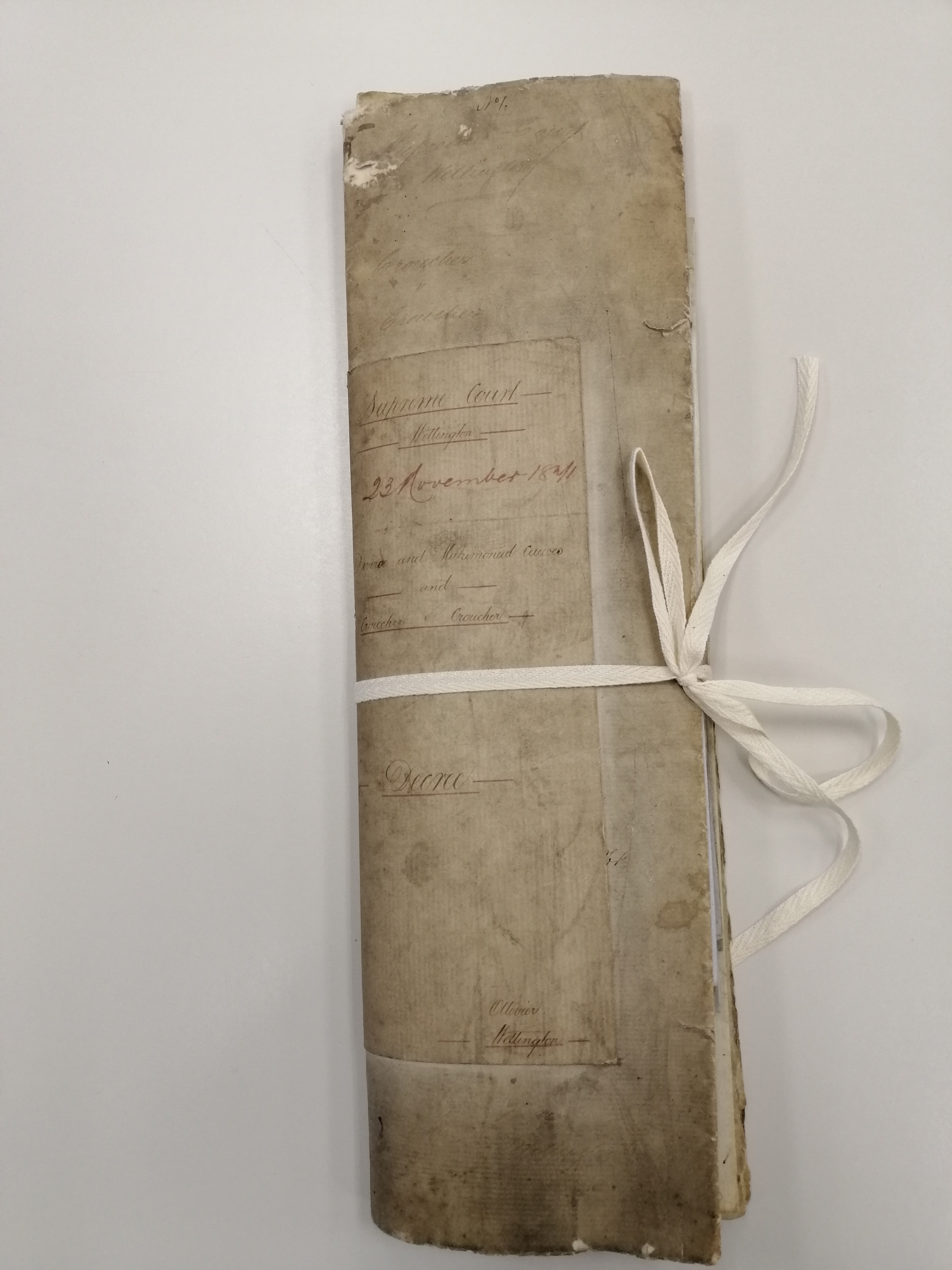
Emily McWilliam's Divorce petition

== Early life ==
Emily Anna Canty (recorded in some documents as Cauty) was born in 1840 in Dover, Kent, United Kingdom. She was the daughter of James Canty and Eliza Ann Mills. She was baptised at St Mary the Virgin Church in Dover on 1 April 1840. Emily had an older sister Mary, and a brother, James. In 1841 Emily was living in Chapel Place, Dover. Her father's occupation at that time was a schoolmaster. The death of Emily's mother Eliza Ann Canty (or Cauty) was registered in September 1840. In 1851, Emily was living with the Sedcole family in Dover. Her brother James was married to Eliza Sedcole and Emily was described a lodger.

== New Zealand life ==
James, Eliza and Emily emigrated to New Zealand along with other members of the Sedcole family including Eliza's parents, William and Margaret Sedcole. Eliza's brother, Captain John Sedcole, lived with his wife and children in Wellington. Emily married Captain Elijah Croucher on 26 September 1860 after a three-week engagement. Emily and Elijah lived together for a few weeks only.

Shortly after the marriage, Elijah departed for Lyttelton, intending to find a matrimonial home there. Emily was supposed to join him but did not do so despite several letters from him and his sending her £18. On 24 December 1860, instead of leaving for Lyttelton on the Emerald she travelled on the Sea Gull to Wanganui where she reinvented herself as a dressmaker by the name of Miss Neville (sometimes recorded as "Nevill").

In November 1869 Emily petitioned the New Zealand Supreme Court for a divorce on the grounds of her husband's adultery and bigamy: Croucher had married Emily's sister-in-law, Eliza, while still married to Emily. Emily's divorce was granted under the Divorce and Matrimonial Causes Act 1867. Under this Act, a husband could divorce his wife on the grounds of her adultery but a husband's adultery was not of itself sufficient grounds for divorce. A wife also had to prove some other ground such as cruelty, desertion or bigamy. The Chief Justice said that "under ordinary circumstances the relief of the Court would not have been granted because the grounds on which the petition had been presented were not sufficiently strong in warranting the Court in granting a dissolution of the marriage.... nevertheless the Court was disposed under all the circumstances to be lenient."

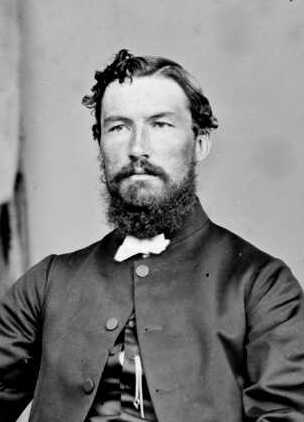
Her second husband, the Reverend James McWilliam

Emily married the Reverend James McWilliam on 25 June 1873 using the name Emily Anna Canty although one source refers to her as Miss Emily Nevill. She was active in the work of the Maori Anglican Mission in Otaki of which her husband James was appointed head. They had five children:

- Olive, wife of Arthur Vere Winchester of Levin (1874–1957)
- James Thomas McWilliam (1876–1945)
- Catherine Minna McWilliam (1879–1881)
- Isabel Maud Burr, wife of Patrick Harvey Burr of Te Hauke (1881–1948)
- Muriel Mary Annie McWilliam of Te Hauke (1883–1957)

Her husband died on 29 January 1907.

== Musical associations ==
Emily assisted with singing at concerts given by member of the Orpheus Glee Club between 1886 and 1888. Former members of the Club held a concert on 24 April 1889 at the Oddfellows Hall in Otaki and Emily was one of twenty members who performed in the reunion concert. She was identified in an accompanying magazine article as "Miss Neville (Mrs James McWilliam)".

== Death ==
Emily died on 4 May 1899 and was buried in Te Aute Cemetery, Central Hawkes Bay. Emily died intestate. Her eldest daughter Olive swore an affidavit stating that her mother "was married once only".

== Memorials ==
On Emily's death in 1899 a subscription was set up to celebrate her service to the community. This was in the form of a clock erected on a tower in the Otaki Post Office building. The Otaki community, both Maori and Pakeha, raised money for a memorial to Emily: in March 1901, a clock was mounted on a pedestal on the corner of Te Rauparaha and Main Streets in Otaki. The site was later needed for a new post office and the clock was relocated inside the building in 1903. The building was demolished in 1951 because of earthquake damage and at that time the New Zealand Post Office declined to take over the clock. Instead responsibility for it passed to the Otaki Borough Council. Its fate after that is unknown.

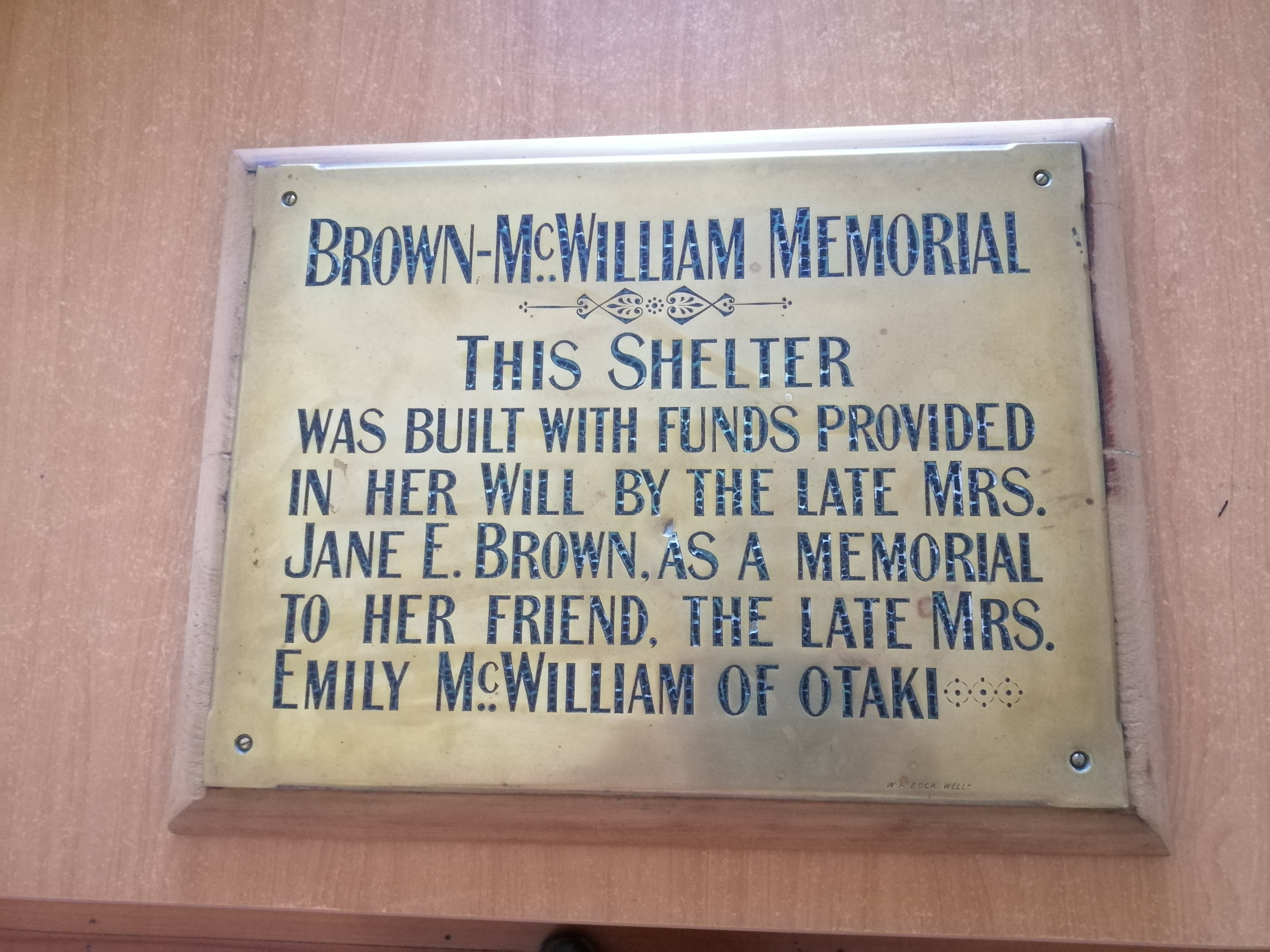
Brown-McWilliam Memorial Plaque

In 1908, Jane Brown bequeathed two hundred pounds as well as the residue of her estate "for the benefit of the cottage hospital at Otaki and to be applied by the trustees of the institution in such manner that it may be a lasting memento of my dear friend Mrs Emily McWilliam and her work in connection with the institution". A plaque was erected on a shelter at the Otaki Sanitorium memorialising McWilliam from funds left by Jane Brown.

There was considerable controversy for many years over the disposition of the funds left by Jane Brown with the matter becoming the subject of correspondence between the Solicitor-General and the Director of Health. Some items were purchased for the benefit of the patients over a period of years. Eventually the balance of £308 was passed to the Palmerston North Hospital Board but the disposition of those funds is unknown.
