= Ōtaki River =

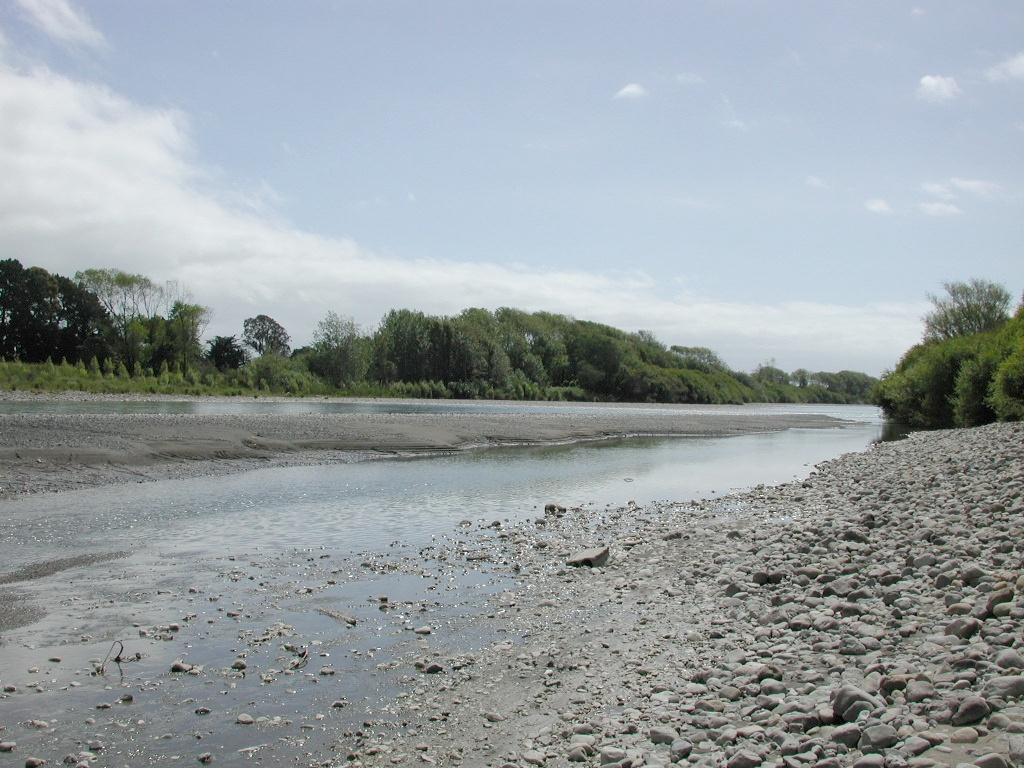
- Ōtaki River near Ōtaki
- Route of the Ōtaki River
- Native name: Te Awa o Ōtaki (Māori)

Location
- Country: New Zealand

Physical characteristics
- Source: Tararua Range
  - location: Pukematawai
  - coordinates: 40°44′48″S 175°25′17″E
- Mouth
  - location: South Taranaki Bight
  - coordinates: 40°45′31″S 175°06′15″E
  - elevation: 0 m (0 ft)
- Length: 65 km (40 mi)
- Basin size: 348 km^{2} (134 mi^{2})

Basin features
- Progression: Ōtaki River → South Taranaki Bight → Tasman Sea
- Landmarks: Ōtaki Forks, Tararua Forest Park, Ōtaki, Ōtaki Beach
- Tributaries
  - left: Collie Creek, Kelleher Creek, Kahiwiroa Stream, Whatiuru Creek, Penn Creek, Waiotauru River, Pukeatua Stream / Roaring Meg, Pukehinau Stream
  - right: Waiopehu Stream, Murray Creek, Waitewaewae River, Arapito Creek, Plateau Stream, Gorge Creek, Waitatapia Stream, Ngātoko Stream, Rangiuru Stream.
- Bridges: Ōtaki River Bridge

The Ōtaki River is in the southwestern North Island of New Zealand, located in the Kāpiti Coast District.

== Geography ==
It originates in the Tararua Range and flows for 45 kilometres (28 mi), heading southwest through a valley in the Tararua Ranges. It turns northwest in the area of Ōtaki Forks, where it is joined by the Waiotauru River. After continuing through Otaki Gorge towards Kāpiti Coast, it crosses State Highway 1 (SH1) south of Ōtaki and reaches the Tasman Sea south of the settlement of Ōtaki Beach. Around 80% of the catchment area of the river is within the Tararua Forest Park.

The Ōtaki River is one of the major rivers that formed the fertile floodplains of the Kāpiti Coast. The Ōtaki Forks area, accessible via Otaki Gorge Road, is a popular recreational area and the start of several tramping tracks into the Tararua Range.

== Uses ==
The Ōtaki River also offers fishing of brown trout and whitebait.

It was reported in 1863 that the river contains "what appears to be vein stones of carbonate, of lime in soft slate, are found in grade quantities."
