= Mount Hector (New Zealand) =

Mountain in Tararua Range, New Zealand

Mount Hector (Pukemoumou)
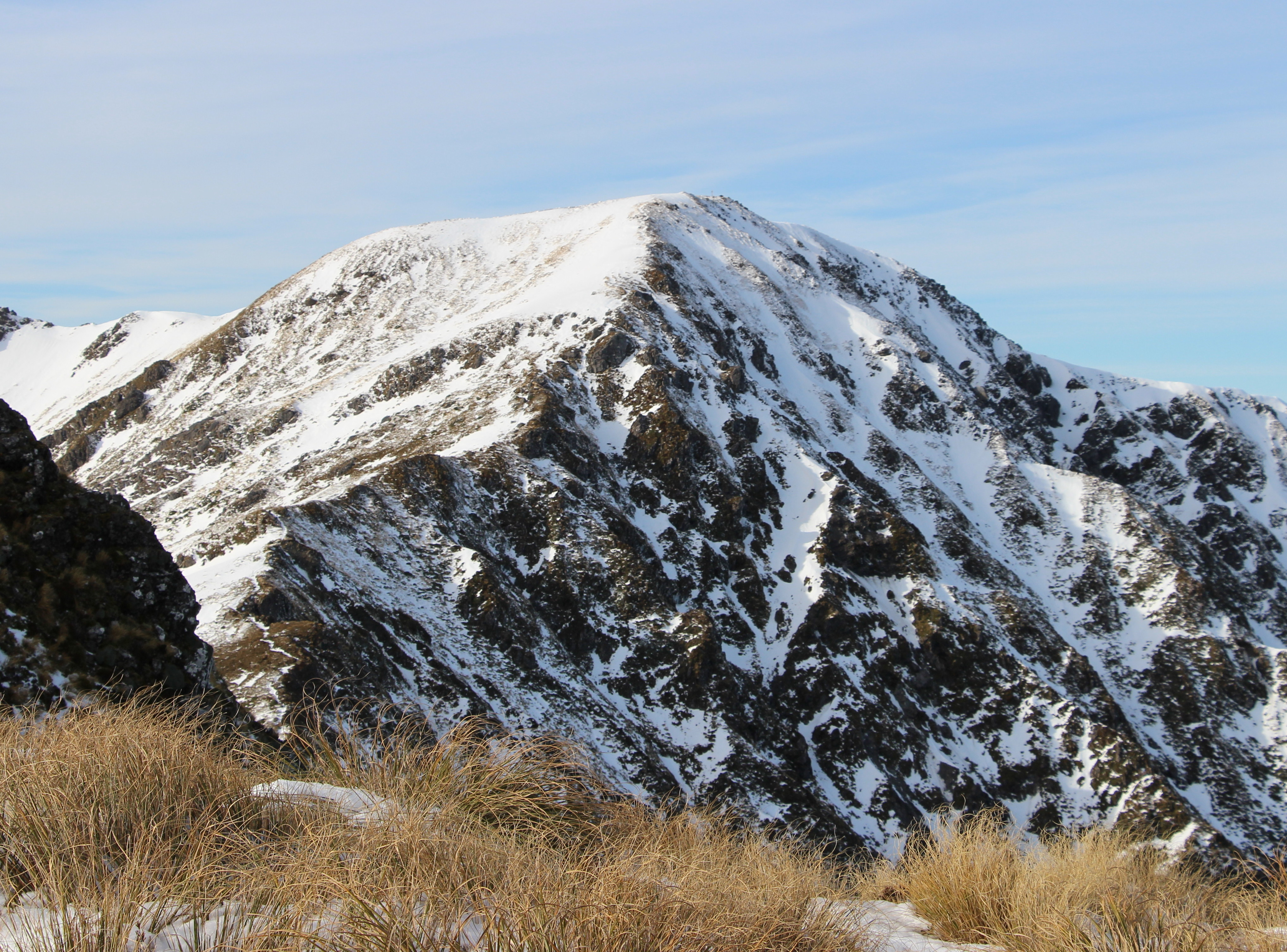
- Mt Hector in the winter

Highest point
- Elevation: 1,529 m (5,016 ft)
- Coordinates: 40°57′S 175°17′E

Geography
- Location within North Island Location within New Zealand
- Location: North Island, New Zealand
- Parent range: Tararua Range

Mount Hector is one of the highest peaks in the Tararua Range, situated in the lower North Island of New Zealand. It has a height of 1,529 metres (5,016 ft).

The peak is named after James Hector, a prominent scientist in New Zealand during the 19th century.

Mt Hector is the site of a memorial cross commemorating trampers killed in the Second World War.
