= Ōtaki Forks =

Rural locality in Wellington Region, New Zealand

- Rural locality
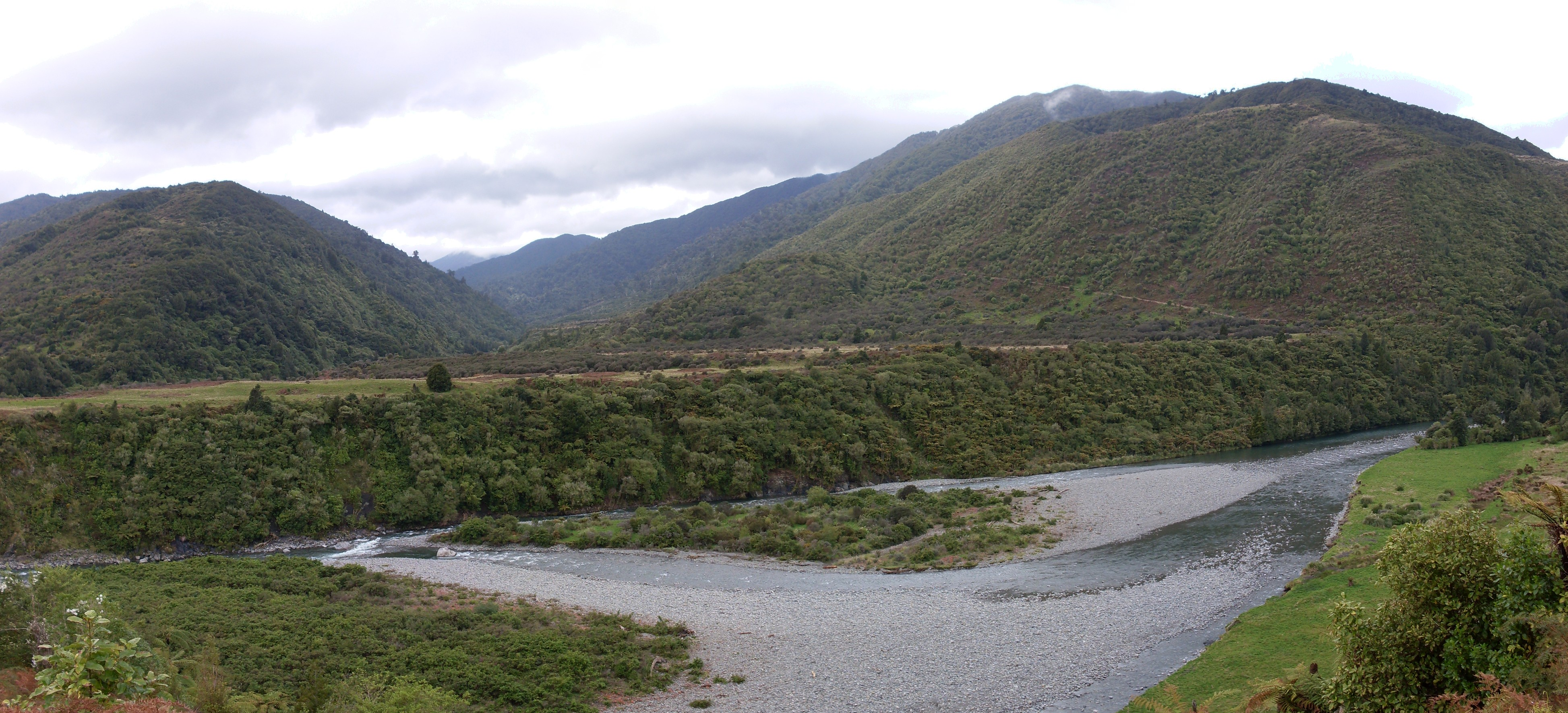
- The Ōtaki River just upstream of the forks
- Interactive map of Ōtaki Forks
- Coordinates: 40.868°S 175.235°E
- Country: New Zealand
- Region: Wellington Region
- Territorial authority: Kāpiti Coast District
- Ward: Ōtaki Ward; Waikanae Ward
- Community: Ōtaki Community; Waikanae Community
- Electorates: Kapiti; Te Tai Hauāuru (Māori)

Government
  - Territorial Authority: Kāpiti Coast District Council
  - Regional council: Greater Wellington Regional Council
  - Kāpiti Coast Mayor: Janet Holborow
  - Kapiti MP: Tim Costley
  - Te Tai Hauāuru MP: Debbie Ngarewa-Packer

Area
  - Total: 87.32 km^{2} (33.71 sq mi)

Population (June 2025)
  - Total: 890
  - Density: 10/km^{2} (26/sq mi)

Ōtaki Forks is a rural locality in the Kāpiti Coast District of the Wellington Region of New Zealand's North Island. It is located at the confluence of the Ōtaki River with its tributaries Waiotauru River and Waitatapia Stream. It is 18 km southeast of Ōtaki by road. It is the major entrance to the Tararua Forest Park from the west.

Seed & O'Brien's steam-powered sawmill at Sheridan Creek, which operated from 1930 to 1938, has been partially restored. It was closed by a flood which destroyed bridges.

== Demographics ==
The statistical area of Ōtaki Forks, which also includes Hautere, covers 87.32 km^{2} (33.71 sq mi). It had an estimated population of 890 as of June 2025, with a population density of 10.19 people per km^{2}.

Historical population
| Year | Pop. | ±% p.a. |
|---|---|---|
| 2006 | 660 | — |
| 2013 | 717 | +1.19% |
| 2018 | 777 | +1.62% |
| 2023 | 867 | +2.22% |

Ōtaki Forks had a population of 867 in the 2023 New Zealand census, an increase of 90 people (11.6%) since the 2018 census, and an increase of 150 people (20.9%) since the 2013 census. There were 429 males, 429 females, and 9 people of other genders in 342 dwellings. 4.5% of people identified as LGBTIQ+. The median age was 52.4 years (compared with 38.1 years nationally). There were 129 people (14.9%) aged under 15 years, 111 (12.8%) aged 15 to 29, 408 (47.1%) aged 30 to 64, and 219 (25.3%) aged 65 or older.

People could identify as more than one ethnicity. The results were 90.7% European (Pākehā); 10.7% Māori; 3.1% Pasifika; 2.8% Asian; 1.4% Middle Eastern, Latin American and African New Zealanders (MELAA); and 5.5% other, which includes people giving their ethnicity as "New Zealander". English was spoken by 97.9%, Māori by 2.1%, and other languages by 9.0%. No language could be spoken by 1.4% (e.g. too young to talk). New Zealand Sign Language was known by 0.7%. The percentage of people born overseas was 22.1, compared with 28.8% nationally.

Religious affiliations were 27.3% Christian, 1.0% Buddhist, 1.0% New Age, 0.3% Jewish, and 1.0% other religions. People who answered that they had no religion were 62.6%, and 6.6% of people did not answer the census question.

Of those at least 15 years old, 246 (33.3%) people had a bachelor's or higher degree, 357 (48.4%) had a post-high school certificate or diploma, and 138 (18.7%) people exclusively held high school qualifications. The median income was $38,200, compared with $41,500 nationally. 141 people (19.1%) earned over $100,000 compared to 12.1% nationally. The employment status of those at least 15 was 324 (43.9%) full-time, 150 (20.3%) part-time, and 15 (2.0%) unemployed.
