= Ōtaki, New Zealand =

Settlement in Wellington Region, New Zealand

Ōtaki
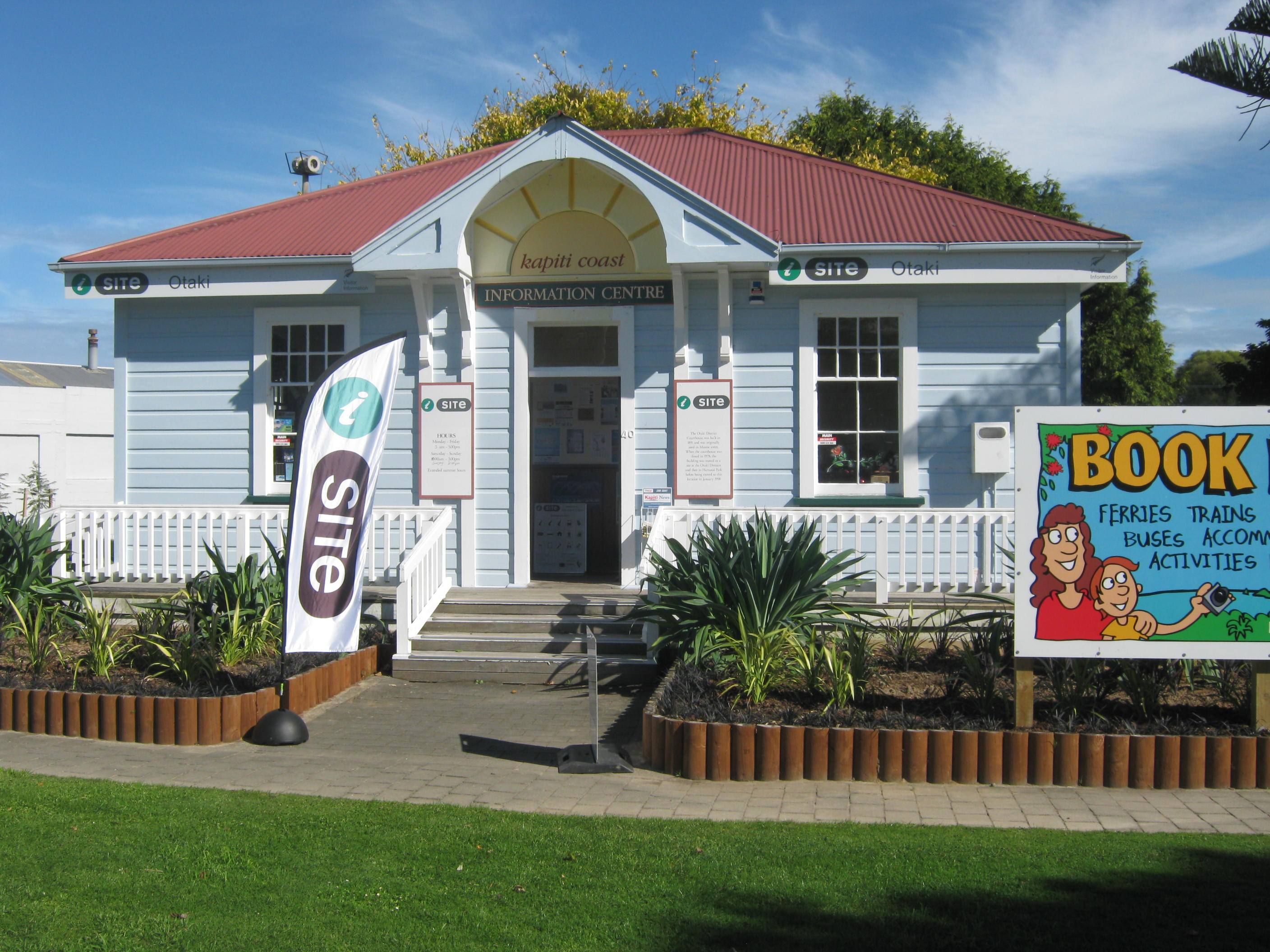
- Former information centre
- Interactive map of Ōtaki
- Coordinates: 40.753°S 175.140°E
- Country: New Zealand
- Region: Wellington Region
- Territorial authority: Kāpiti Coast District
- Ward: Ōtaki Ward
- Community: Ōtaki Community
- Electorates: Kapiti; Te Tai Hauāuru (Māori)

Government
  - Territorial Authority: Kāpiti Coast District Council
  - Regional council: Greater Wellington Regional Council
  - Kāpiti Coast Mayor: Janet Holborow
  - Kapiti MP: Tim Costley
  - Te Tai Hauāuru MP: Debbie Ngarewa-Packer

Area
  - Total: 8.46 km^{2} (3.27 sq mi)

Population (June 2025)
  - Total: 3,940
  - Density: 466/km^{2} (1,210/sq mi)
- Postal code: 5512
- Area code: 06

Ōtaki is a town in the Kāpiti Coast District of the North Island of New Zealand, situated halfway between the capital city Wellington, 70 km (43 mi) to the southwest, and Palmerston North, 70 km (43 mi) to the northeast.

Ōtaki is located on New Zealand State Highway 1 and the North Island Main Trunk railway between Wellington and Auckland and marks the northernmost point of the Wellington Region.

The New Zealand Ministry for Culture and Heritage gives a translation of "place of sticking a staff into the ground" for Ōtaki.

== History ==
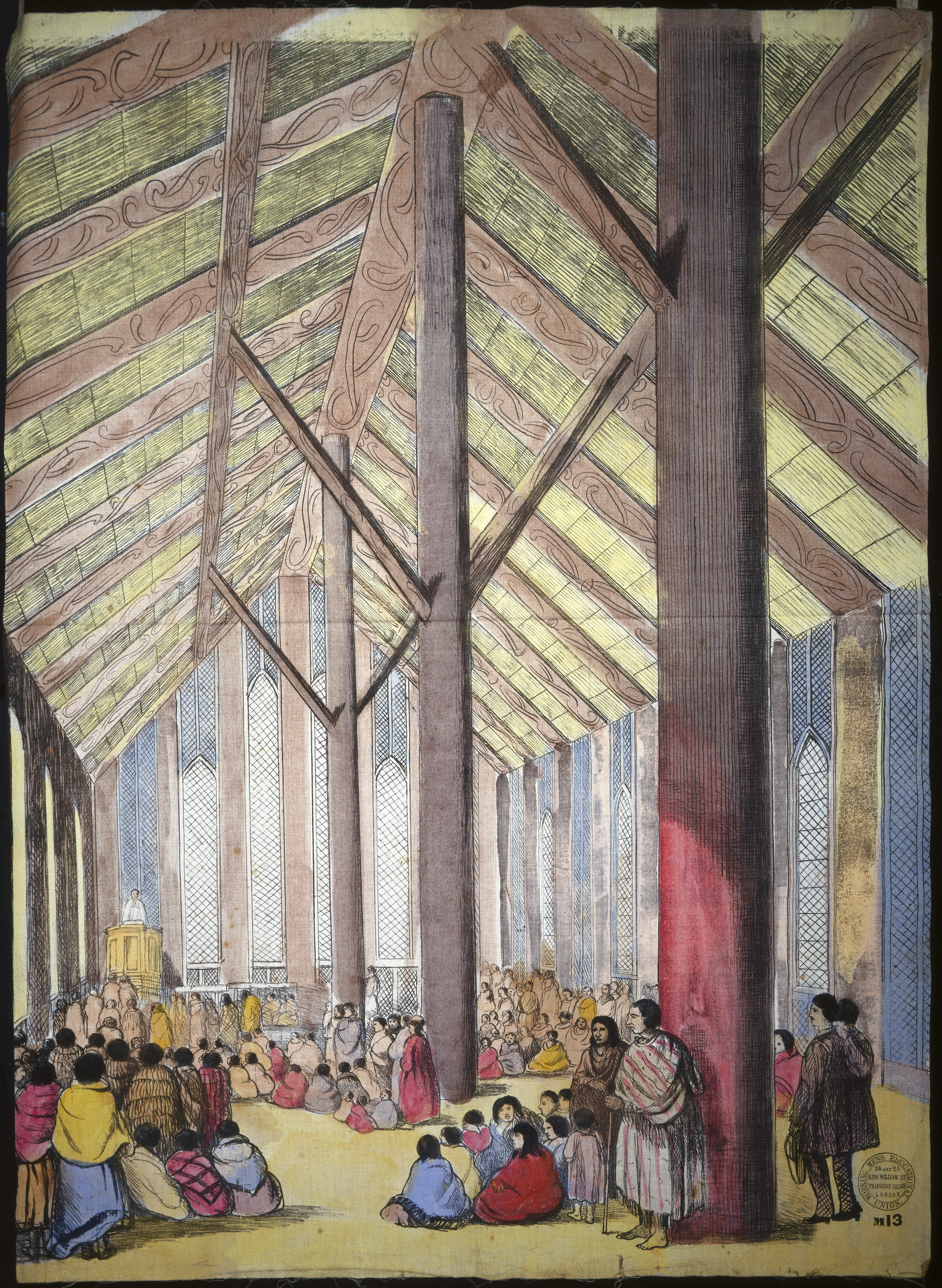
Interior of Rangiātea Church in Ōtaki by Barraud in circa 1851

Since the early 19th century, the area has been home to Māori of the Ngāti Raukawa iwi who had migrated from the Waikato area from about 1819, under the leadership of Te Rauparaha amongst others. They had supplanted the Rangitāne and Muaūpoko people.

At the request of Te Rauparaha, missionaries Henry Williams and Octavius Hadfield visited the area in December and Hadfield opened the first mission in the Wellington Region at Ōtaki. At the nearby Raukawa marae is the Rangiātea Church, the original of which was completed in 1851. Burnt down in 1995, it was completely rebuilt by 2003. The Reverend James McWilliam was Clergyman in charge of the Maori Mission in Ōtaki under the Church Missionary Society of England from 1868 to 1906 with the support of his wife, Emily McWilliam.

=== Marae ===
The community has three marae, affiliated with the iwi of Ngāti Raukawa ki te Tonga and its hapū.

Te Pou o Tainui Marae and Kapumanawawhiti meeting house are affiliated with the hapū of Ngāti Kapumanawawhiti.

In October 2020, the Government committed $159,203 from the Provincial Growth Fund to upgrade the marae, and create 12 jobs.

Raukawa Marae and meeting house are affiliated with the hapū of Ngāti Korokī, Ngāti Maiotaki and Ngāti Pare. In October 2020, the Government committed $337,112 from the Provincial Growth Fund to upgrade the marae, and create 12 jobs.

Pukekaraka Marae in Ōtaki was the site of a Catholic mission from 1842. It includes the Roma meeting house, built in 1904, and Hine Nui O Te Ao Katoa meeting house, built for tangi and larger gatherings in 1905. The marae has been used by both Ngāti Raukawa ki te Tonga and Muaūpoko. In October 2020, the Government committed $143,984 from the Provincial Growth Fund to upgrade the site, creating an estimated 8 jobs.

== Demographics ==
The statistical area of Ōtaki covers 8.46 km^{2} (3.27 sq mi). It had an estimated population of 3,940 as of June 2025, with a population density of 465.72 people per km^{2}.

Historical population
Year	Pop.	±% p.a.
2006	2,853	—
2013	3,099	+1.19%
2018	3,489	+2.40%
2023	3,771	+1.57%

Ōtaki had a population of 3,771 in the 2023 New Zealand census, an increase of 282 people (8.1%) since the 2018 census, and an increase of 672 people (21.7%) since the 2013 census. There were 1,758 males, 1,986 females, and 27 people of other genders in 1,566 dwellings. 4.2% of people identified as LGBTIQ+. The median age was 42.1 years (compared with 38.1 years nationally). There were 708 people (18.8%) aged under 15 years, 648 (17.2%) aged 15 to 29, 1,548 (41.1%) aged 30 to 64, and 867 (23.0%) aged 65 or older.

People could identify as more than one ethnicity. The results were 70.2% European (Pākehā); 40.3% Māori; 6.5% Pasifika; 5.9% Asian; 0.7% Middle Eastern, Latin American and African New Zealanders (MELAA); and 2.3% other, which includes people giving their ethnicity as "New Zealander". English was spoken by 96.0%, Māori by 18.6%, Samoan by 0.6%, and other languages by 7.7%. No language could be spoken by 2.1% (e.g. too young to talk). New Zealand Sign Language was known by 0.6%. The percentage of people born overseas was 15.0, compared with 28.8% nationally.

Religious affiliations were 29.5% Christian, 0.5% Hindu, 0.1% Islam, 2.9% Māori religious beliefs, 0.6% Buddhist, 0.4% New Age, 0.2% Jewish, and 1.0% other religions. People who answered that they had no religion were 56.6%, and 8.5% of people did not answer the census question.

Of those at least 15 years old, 609 (19.9%) people had a bachelor's or higher degree, 1,692 (55.2%) had a post-high school certificate or diploma, and 762 (24.9%) people exclusively held high school qualifications. The median income was $33,100, compared with $41,500 nationally. 195 people (6.4%) earned over $100,000 compared to 12.1% nationally. The employment status of those at least 15 was 1,314 (42.9%) full-time, 411 (13.4%) part-time, and 111 (3.6%) unemployed.

In 2017, approximately 50% of all Māori people in Ōtaki could speak the Māori language, and the town aims to become one of the first bilingual towns in New Zealand.

== Geography ==
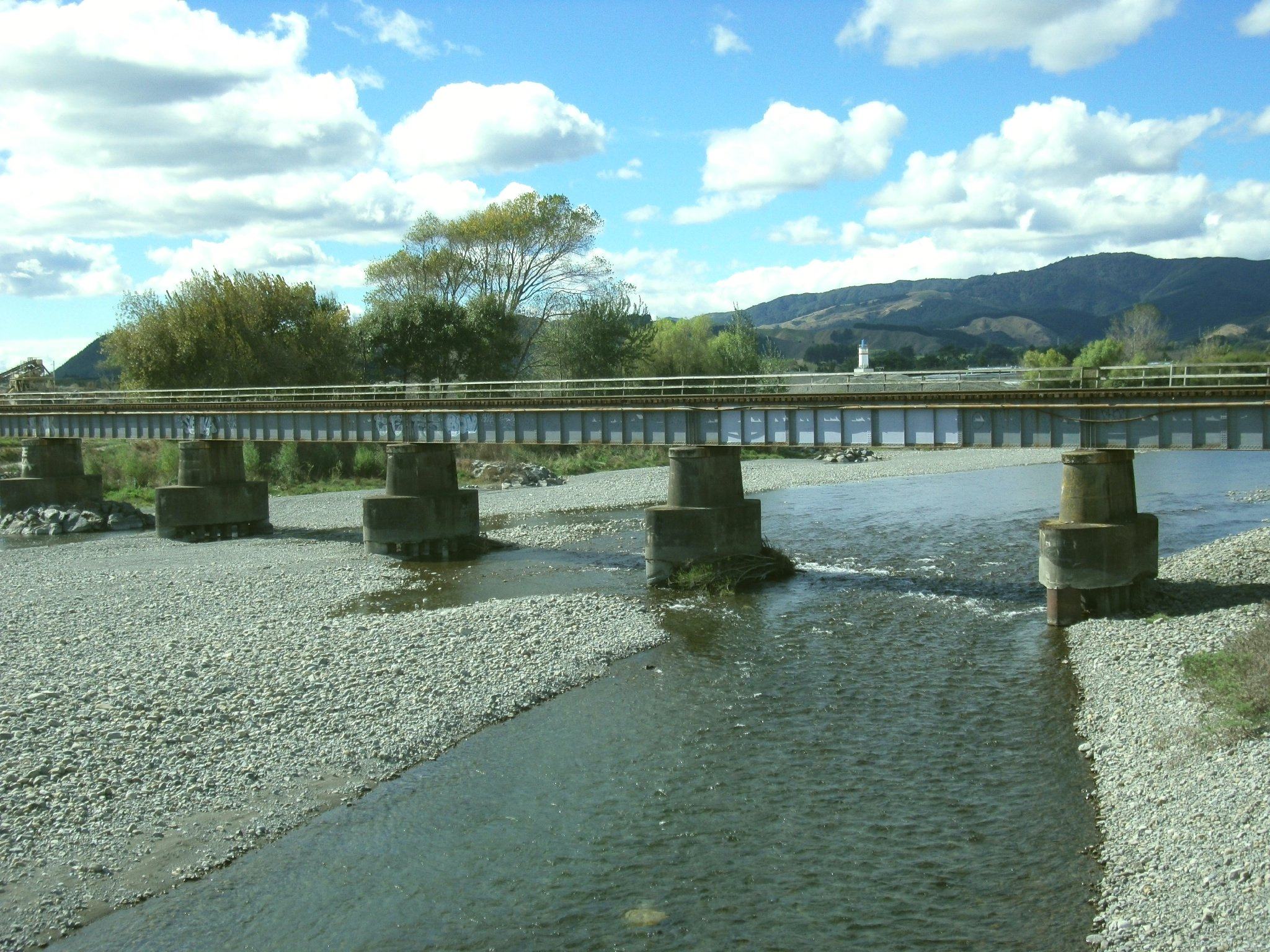
Main Trunk line bridge over the Ōtaki River

The town is situated at the northern end of the Kāpiti Coast, close to the banks of the Ōtaki River to the south and Waitohu Stream to the north.

The surrounding district includes Te Horo, Hautere, and Manakau and the beach settlement at Waikawa Beach. The district is agricultural, with market gardens and lifestyle blocks. The economy of the town includes service industries for the rural community. Ōtaki has two local newspapers – Ōtaki Today and the Ōtaki Mail, unusual for a small New Zealand town

== Features ==
Ōtaki is home to Te Wānanga o Raukawa a Tikanga Māori university. It also hosts the annual Māoriland Film Festival and Otaki Kite Festival. and is home of The Ōtaki-Māori Racing Club. established in 1886.

Ōtaki Forks is the main western gateway to the Tararua Forest Park. It offers recreational activities ranging from short walks, swimming, camping, rafting and kayaking to advanced tramps of 3 – 5 days duration, including the Southern Crossing that ends at Kaitoke 45 km northeast of Wellington.

Ōtaki Beach spans the stretch of coastline between the Ōtaki River and the Waitohu Stream, with a residential community of both permanent and holiday homes. The beach is popular for surfing, swimming, recreational fishing, horse riding, walking and photography.

== Sports ==
Otaki Golf Club established in 1901, is a links style 18 hole golf course located at the northern end of the historic Old Coach Road.

Other sports facilities include rugby, rugby league, netball, swimming, wakaama, water polo, football, squash, and tennis.

== Community ==
The Māoriland Film Festival which began in 2014 is held annually in Ōtaki with a focus on indigenous film content.

The Otaki Museum is located at 49 Main Street in the former BNZ building and provides access to local history collections, oral histories, photographs and documents.

== Infrastructure and services ==
Both State Highway 1 and the North Island Main Trunk railway passes through the town, connecting it with Paraparaumu and Wellington to the south and Levin, Palmerston North and ultimately Auckland in the north. The Peka Peka to Ōtaki section of the Kāpiti Expressway opened in December 2022, allowing State Highway 1 through traffic to bypass the town. Prior to the expressway opening, the highway through the town and especially the roundabout with Mill Road were a traffic bottleneck; at holiday periods, Wellington-bound traffic could queue for up to 4 kilometres (2.5 mi) north of the roundabout.

The historic Ōtaki railway station was opened in 1886 and is currently served by the Capital Connection train on a weekday basis. Upgrade work is underway and from 2029, new battery-electric trains will run multiple daily service from Ōtaki to Wellington.

Located south of the Otaki river (on Otaki Gorge Road) is the Otaki Aerodrome (NZOT) which consists of a single grass runway (16/34) of approximately 800 metres in length and has minimal facilities.

Electra operates the electricity distribution network in Ōtaki. The town is normally supplied from Transpower's national grid at its Paraparaumu substation, but can be switched to be supplied from the Mangahao substation near Shannon.

The town's fresh water supply is drawn from three groundwater bores.

== Education ==
All these schools are co-educational. Rolls are as of July 2026.

=== Early Learning Schools ===
Ōtaki Montessori School is a pre-school for children from ages 2–6.

Ōtaki Early Learning Centre is a pre-school for children of age 2 and above.

Ōtaki Kindergarten is a pre-school for children of age 2 and above.

Ōtaki Playcentre is an early childhood centre for children from birth to six years old.

=== Primary schools ===
Ōtaki School, also called Te Kura o Ōtaki, is a state primary school for Year 1 to 6 students. with a roll of 204. The school was established in 1878. It burned down in 1894 but was rebuilt.

Waitohu School is a state primary school for Year 1 to 6 students with a roll of 233. It opened in 1963.

St Peter Chanel School is a state-integrated Christian primary school for Year 1 to 8 students. with a roll of 20. It opened in 1894.

=== Kura Kaupapa ===
Te Kura Kaupapa Māori o Te Rito is a state Kura Kaupapa Māori school for Year 1 to 13 students, with a roll of 98 as of July 2026. It opened in 1991, but had origins in private homes, on a marae, and at Te Wānanga o Raukawa since 1990. In 1995, it expanded to include secondary education.

Te Kura-a-iwi o Whakatupuranga Rua Mano is a state Māori language immersion school for Year 1 to 13 students, with a roll of 204. It opened in 2002.

=== Secondary school ===
Ōtaki College is a state secondary school for Year 7 to 13 students, with a roll of 422 as of July 2026. It began in 1959 as Ōtaki District High School, and changed to a secondary school for Forms 1 to 7 in 1971.

=== Tertiary education ===
Te Wānanga o Raukawa is a Māori tertiary institute based in Ōtaki. It opened in 1981.

== Notable people ==
- Vincent Bevan, New Zealand and Wellington rugby-union player.
- Iain Hewitson, Australian TV chef.
- Carla Van Zon, artistic director.
- Renée (1929–2023), writer
- Sir William Walkley, oil-company executive.
- Inia Te Wiata
- Keeley O'Hagan, high jumper
- Shay Evans, Drag Entertainer
- Brent Wong, painter
