= Mitre (New Zealand) =

Mountain in North Island, New Zealand

Pukeamoamo / Mitre
- Pukeamoamo / Mitre seen from Peggys Peak

Highest point
- Elevation: 1,571 m (5,154 ft)
- Prominence: 1331 m
- Isolation: 113 km
- Coordinates: 40°48′S 175°27′E

Naming
- Native name: Pukeamoamo (Māori)

Geography
- Location within New Zealand
- Location: Carterton District, Wellington Region, New Zealand
- Parent range: Tararua Range

Pukeamoamo / Mitre is the highest mountain of the Tararua Range, situated in the lower North Island of New Zealand. It has a total height of 1,571 metres (5,154 ft).

The mountain was named after its double peak that resembles a bishop's mitre.
