= Tararua Forest Park =

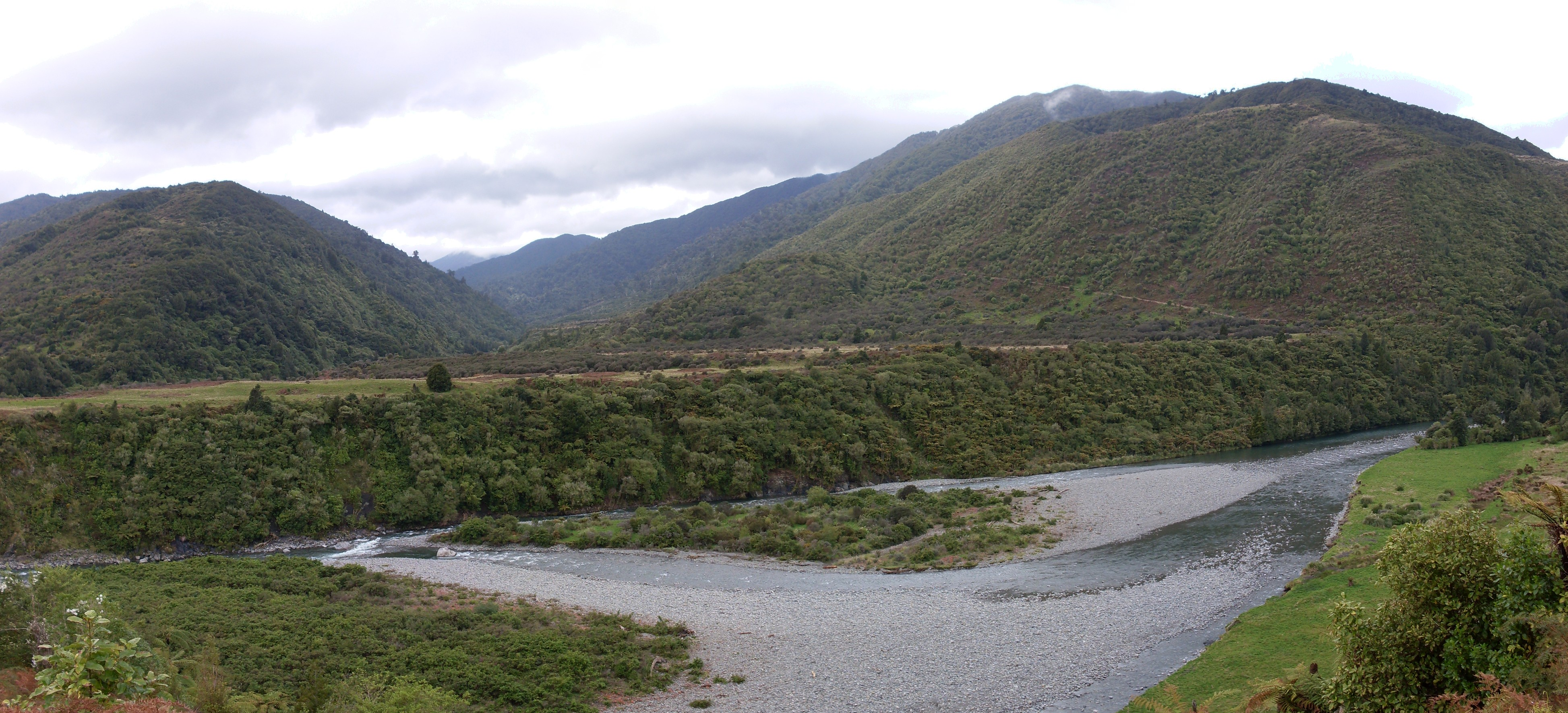
- Ōtaki River near Ōtaki Forks

- Location within New Zealand
- Location: North Island, New Zealand
- Nearest city: Palmerston North / Upper Hutt
- Coordinates: 40.83°S 175.39°E
- Area: 114,993 hectares (284,150 acres)
- Established: 1954
- Governing body: Department of Conservation

Tararua Forest Park, often called the Tararuas is a protected area in the Wellington region of New Zealand. Its area is 1,150 square kilometres (440 sq mi), and its highest point, a peak called Mitre, is at 1571 m above sea level. It was established in 1954, as New Zealand's first Forest Park, and is managed by the Department of Conservation (DOC) under the Conservation Act. Tararua Forest Park includes more than three-quarters of the Tararua Range, and its boundaries extend north from New Zealand State Highway 2.

== Project Kākā ==
A DOC project launched in 2010, named Project Kākā aims to reduce numbers of rats, stoats and possums over 22,000 ha of the park. The pests will be controlled by aerial drops of 1080 poison with the goal of restoring native plant, insects and birds including kākā, kākāriki and kererū. The project involves the use of sodium fluoroacetate (1080), trapping and wildlife monitoring. In 2013, DOC found that the programme had led to a "significant increase in the call counts of several bird species". However, further research indicates that rat numbers can be fully re-established within 30 months of poisoning.

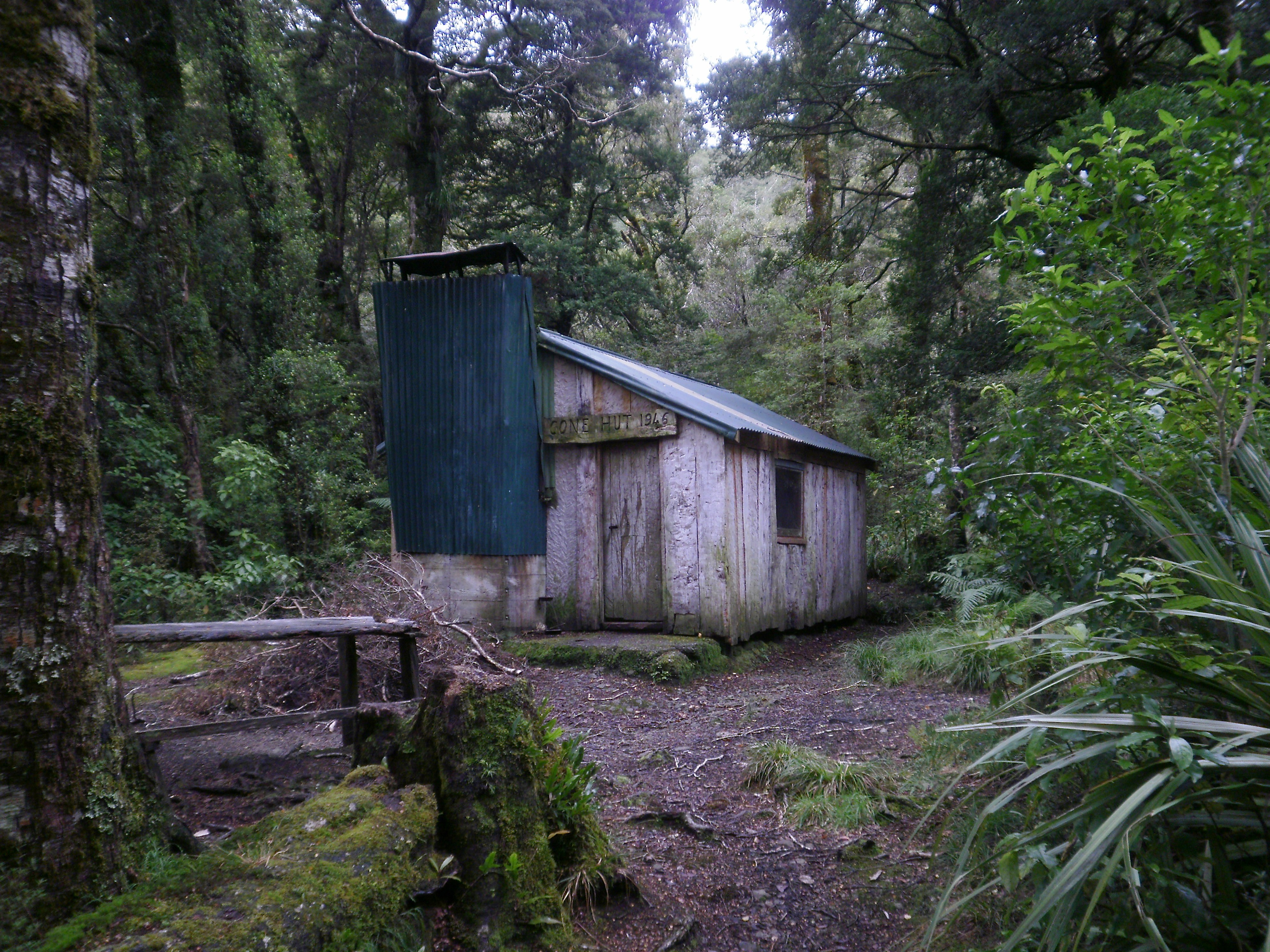
Cone Hut, one of the oldest huts in the Tararuas

== Shorman's-Kaitoke ==
Shorman's-Kaitoke is a tramping route within the Tararua Forest Park. It starts at Putara in the north-east, near a farm or track previously called Shorman and finishes at Kaitoke in the south. The classic route follows the tops of almost the entire Tararua main range, it is approximately 80 km long with 7000 to 8000 metres of ascent and descent. There is virtually no level ground nor straight sections of track and the whole route is very exposed to the frequent storms that sweep across the Tararuas. An unofficially recognised challenge amongst Wellington trampers is to complete this route in less than two days either supported or self-sufficient. An alternative route follows valleys along a fault line, the surface trace of the Tararua section of the Wellington Fault, to the east of the main range. This stays within the Tararua Forest Park but involves much less ascent and avoids bad weather on the mountaintops.

== Weather ==
Wind at higher elevations can be severe (more so than many other places in New Zealand). Trampers should be aware of this. Walking bent over with your hands close to the ground is one technique to deal with severe winds.

== See also ==
- Forest Parks of New Zealand
