= Motungārara Island / Fishermans Island =

Island in New Zealand

- Interactive map of Motungārara Island / Fishermans Island

Geography
- Coordinates: 40.88668°S 174.90067°E

Administration
- New Zealand

Motungārara Island / Fishermans Island, also known as Hiko's Island, Lewis's Island, or Rangihiroa's Island, is an offshore islet in the Rauoterangi Channel, between Kapiti Island and the North Island.

The New Zealand Ministry for Culture and Heritage gives a translation of "lizard island" for Motungārara.

== Geography ==
Motungārara Island / Fishermans Island is unlike its neighbouring islands, Tokomāpuna Island / Aeroplane Island and Tahoramaurea Island / Browns Island, in that it contains two clusters of buildings on the north end of the island; this includes one dwelling and associated accessory buildings. However, it still retains a high level of natural character, yet this is lower than the aforementioned islands and nearby Kapiti Island.

Motungārara Island / Fishermans Island is surrounded by considerable submerged platforms. The island, as well as Tahoramaurea Island / Browns Island, is located on the terrane boundary between the Rakaia and Waipapa terranes. The area between Motungārara Island / Fishermans Island and neighbouring Tahoramaurea Island / Browns Island contains a sandy bottom, with larger gravel areas closer towards the shore.

== Ecology ==
Like its neighbouring islands, Motungārara Island / Fishermans Island is an ecosite, and vegetation is mainly native, with exceptions regarding occasional species, such as boneseed and non-natural karo.

== History ==
In October 1837, the HMS Conway visited the surrounding area. Notes from Captain R.D. Bethune record that the island, along with Tahoramaurea Island / Browns Island, were collectively referred to as the Brothers.

The island was one of the many signing locations of the Treaty of Waitangi. The Ariel, carrying the treaty, sailed from Whanganui to Motungārara Island / Fishermans Island. There, on 4 June 1940, Te Rangihiroa (younger brother of Te Pēhi Kupe) and Te Ohu, who together occupied a partly fortified village on the island, signed the treaty, being the last two signatories of the Cook Strait (Henry Williams) copy. Henry Williams and Octavius Hadfield witnessed the signatures.

At one point, the island contained a shore whaling station under the command of Captain William Lewis, an American whaler, and his brother.
