= Tahoramaurea Island / Browns Island =

Island in New Zealand

- Interactive map of Tahoramaurea Island / Browns Island

Geography
- Coordinates: 40.88941°S 174.90272°E

Administration
- New Zealand

Demographics
- Population: 0

Tahoramaurea Island / Browns Island, also known as Mayhew's Island or Raupero's Island, is an uninhabited off-shore islet in the Rauoterangi Channel, between Kapiti Island and the North Island of New Zealand. The island is just under three hectares in area and access to it is restricted to permitted visitors.

== History ==
Before European arrival, the island was occupied by Māori. At one stage, Te Rauparaha had a kāinga and lived on the northern side of the island. In October 1837, the HMS Conway visited the surrounding area. Notes from Captain R.D. Bethune record that the island, along with Motungārara Island / Fishermans Island, were collectively referred to as the Brothers.

Following the sale of the island to William Mayhew, an American whaler, around 1839, Te Rauparaha continued to reside there, with Mayhew and other American whalers operating on the southern side. Mayhew operated a shore whaling station, on Tahoramaurea Island / Browns Island, and from him, the island got the name Mayhew's Island.

After Mayhew left the island, the whaling station was run by a man called Andrew Brown, who operated a store there until 1846. By April 1849, the island had been abandoned.

In June 1876, the island was the site of the Eliza McPhee wreck. The vessel, travelling from Oamaru to Whanganui sprung a leak, caused by a plank in her hull starting, and the ship was driven ashore.

Today, the island is home to archaeological remnants of the whaling stations, including stone walls, which indicate the sites of former whalers' houses.

== Geography ==
Tahoramaurea Island / Browns Island is largely intact with limited modification present, with it having a very high level of natural character. Like its neighbouring islands, Tokomāpuna Island / Aeroplane Island and Motungārara Island / Fishermans Island, Tahoramaurea Island / Browns Island is surrounded by extensive submerged platforms as a result of submerged rocky reefs. The island is also located within the terrane boundary between the Rakaia and Waipapa terranes.

The island's coastline is composed of predominantly gravel beaches with rock points. The northern coastline is relatively shallow and sheltered, which would have been useful for the whaling community when launching boats. The sea adjacent to the whaling stations were frequently used in the disposal of any unusable waste products, such as whale bone that was unable to be exported as a trade item.

The area between Tahoramaurea Island / Browns Island and neighbouring Motungārara Island / Fishermans Island contains a sandy bottom, with larger gravel areas closer towards the shore.

== Ecology ==
Like its neighbouring islands, Tahoramaurea Island / Browns Island is an ecosite, and vegetation is mainly native, with exceptions regarding occasional species, such as boneseed and non-natural karo. The island is surrounded by patches of reef, however, these are mostly obscured by seaweed and marine growth. The area around the island can reach up to six metres deep, which allows the presence of pāua.
