= Kapitia =

Conservation status
- Not Threatened (NZ TCS)

Scientific classification
- Kingdom: Animalia
- Phylum: Arthropoda
- Subphylum: Chelicerata
- Class: Arachnida
- Order: Araneae
- Infraorder: Araneomorphae
- Family: Oonopidae
- Genus: Kapitia
- Species: K. obscura

Binomial name
- Kapitia obscura Forster, 1956

Genus of spiders

Kapitia is a genus of spiders in the family Oonopidae. It was first described in 1956 by Forster. As of 2024, it contains only one species, Kapitia obscura.

== Taxonomy ==
This species was described in 1956 by Ray Forster from male and female specimens collected on Kapiti Island. It was redescribed in 2012. The holotype is stored at Canterbury Museum. It is the only oonopid spider in New Zealand.

== Description ==
This male is recorded at 1.26mm in length. The carapace, legs and abdomen are yellow coloured. The female is slightly larger at 1.63mm in length.

== Distribution ==
This species is known from scattered locations throughout the North Island of New Zealand, including Three Kings Islands.

== Conservation status ==
Under the New Zealand Threat Classification System, this species is listed as "Not Threatened" with the qualifiers of "Data Poor: Size", "Data Poor: Trend" and "Biologically Sparse".
