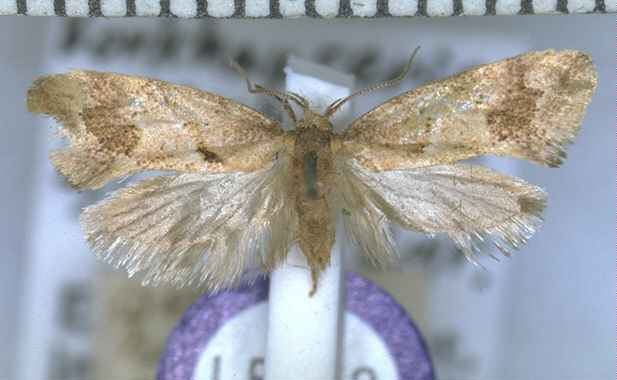
- Male lectotype

Scientific classification
- Kingdom: Animalia
- Phylum: Arthropoda
- Class: Insecta
- Order: Lepidoptera
- Family: Oecophoridae
- Genus: Tingena
- Species: T. penthalea

Binomial name
- Tingena penthalea (Meyrick, 1905)

Synonyms
- Borkhausenia penthalea Meyrick, 1905

= Tingena penthalea =

Species of moth, endemic to New Zealand

Tingena penthalea is a species of moth in the family Oecophoridae. It is endemic to New Zealand and has been observed in Wellington and the Tararua Range. The adults of this species are on the wing from December until February.

== Taxonomy ==
This species was first described by Edward Meyrick in 1905 using three specimens collected in Wellington. Meyrick originally named the species Borkhausenia penthalea. In 1915 Meyrick discussed this species under the same name. In 1926 Alfred Philpott discussed and illustrated the genitalia of the male of this species. In 1928 George Hudson also discussed and illustrated this species in his book The butterflies and moths of New Zealand. In 1988 J. S. Dugdale placed this species within the genus Tingena. The male lectotype is held at the Natural History Museum, London.

== Description ==
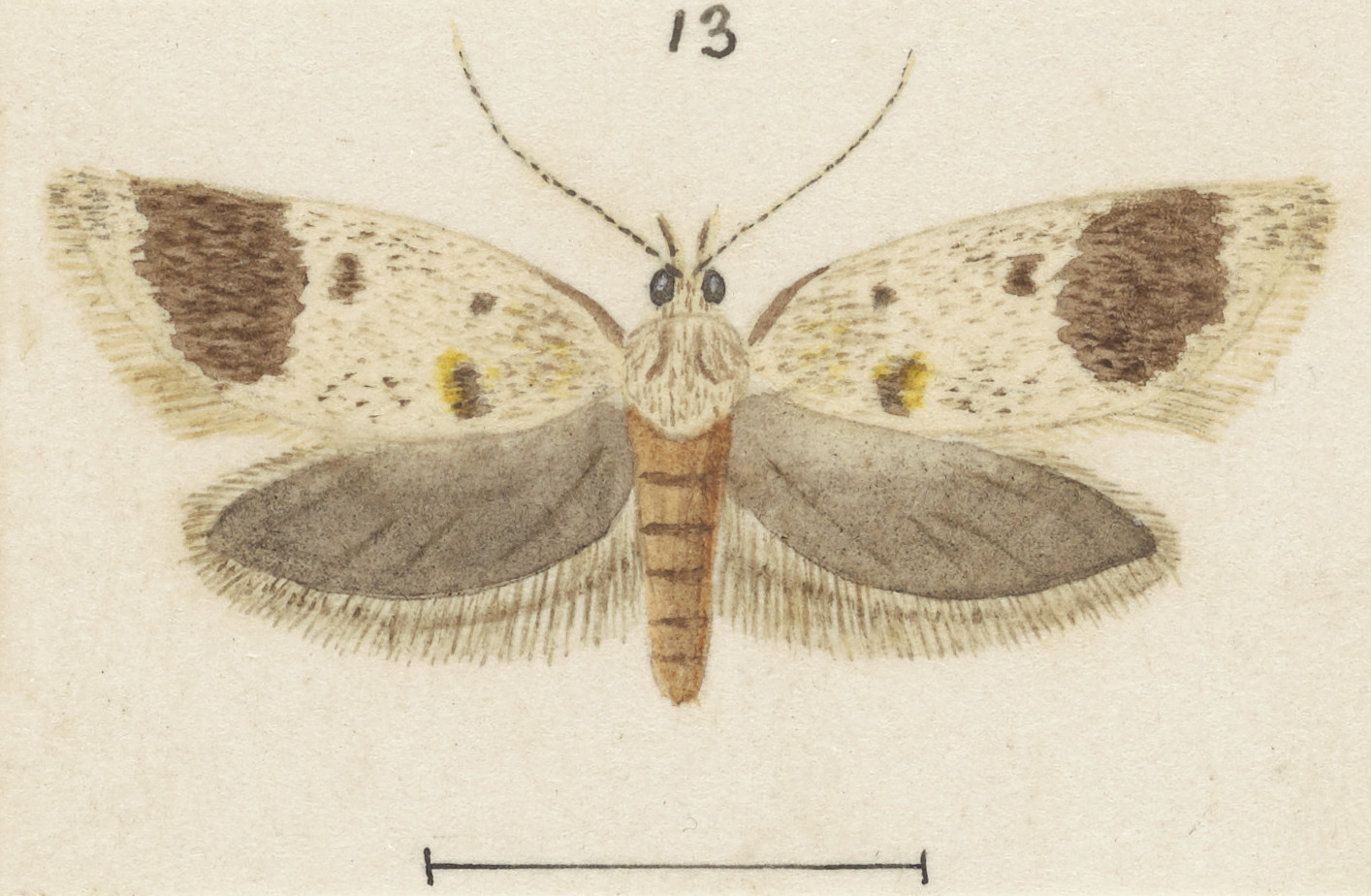
T. penthalea as illustrated by George Hudson.

Meyrick described this species as follows:

♂ ♀. 15-17 mm. Head pale brownish-ochreous, whitish-sprinkled. Palpi ochreous-whitish, second joint with basal half dark fuscous and a subapical ring of dark fuscous irroration, terminal joint with subbasal and subapical rings of dark fuscous irroration. Antennae grey, ciliations of ♂ 1. Thorax pale brownish-ochreous sprinkled with fuscous, anteriorly suffused with dark fuscous. Abdomen light grey. Fore-wings elongate, costa moderately arched, apex obtuse, termen very obliquely rounded; whitish-ochreous, irrorated with light brownish, with some dark fuscous scales towards margins, sometimes forming distinct patches of dark suffusion on costa at base, 1/4, and middle; an oblique dark fuscous mark above dorsum before middle; discal stigmata crescentic, dark fuscous, hollow beneath, often ill-defined; a moderately broad subterminal fuscous or brown fascia, irrorated with dark fuscous, narrowed towards costa and on tornus : cilia whitish-ochreous irrorated with fuscous, at tornus with a darker bar above a pale spot. Hind-wings light grey, darker towards apex; cilia grey-whitish, with grey basal shade.

This species variable in appearance with the brown patch of the forewings sometimes dividing into two distinct spots. The ground colour of this species also varies with some specimens being whiter than others. Also the discal spots may be more orange-brown coloured in some specimens.

== Distribution ==
This species is endemic to New Zealand and has been observed in Wellington, including on Kapiti Island, and in the Tararua Range. It was regarded by Hudson as a rare species.

== Behaviour ==
The adults of this species are on the wing from December until February.
