= Raumati Beach =

Settlement in Wellington Region, New Zealand

- Town
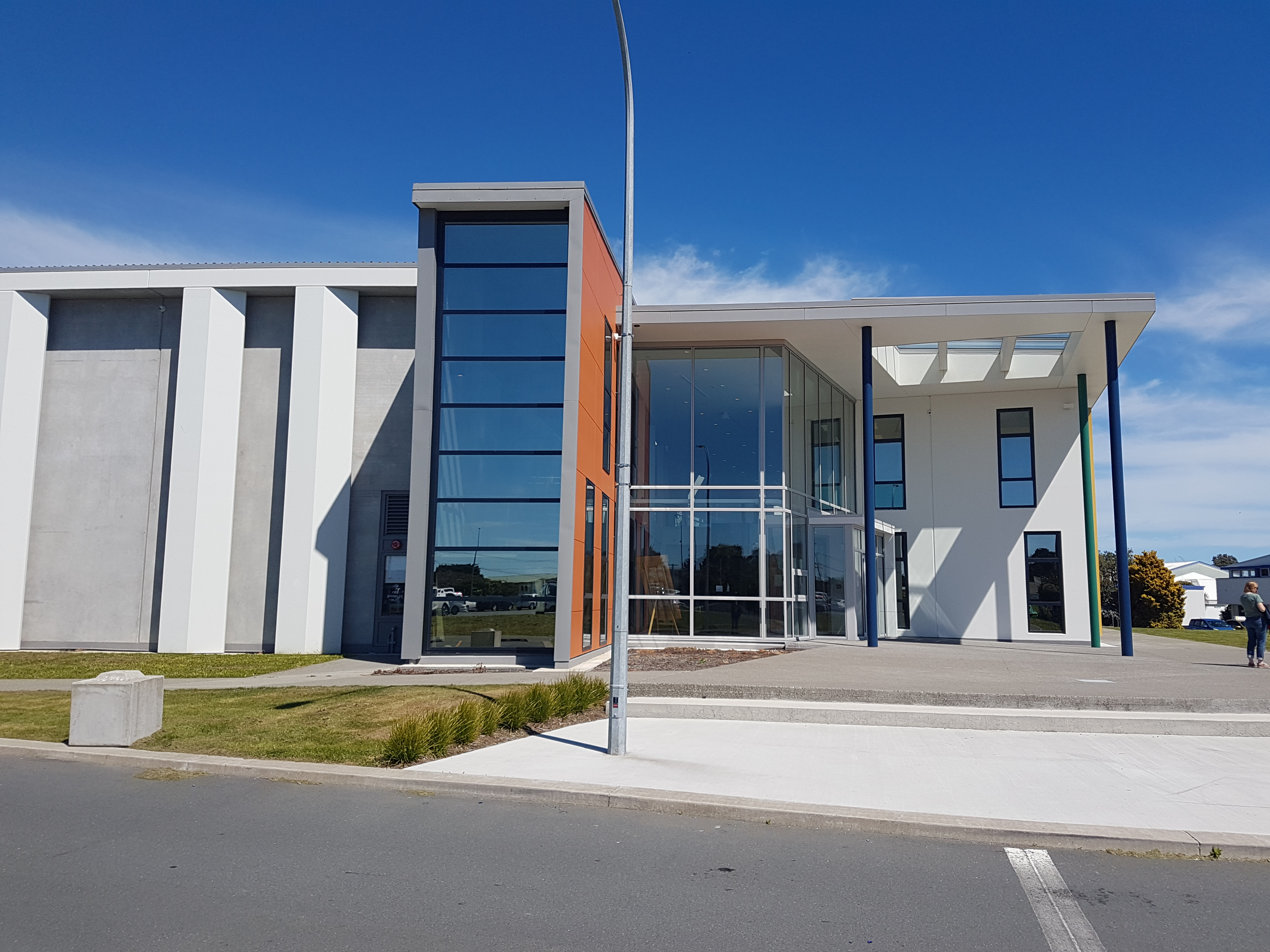
- Te Raukura ki Kāpiti - Performing Arts Centre
- Interactive map of Raumati Beach
- Coordinates: 40.918717°S 174.981143°E
- Country: New Zealand
- Region: Wellington Region
- Territorial authority: Kāpiti Coast District
- Ward: Paraparaumu Ward; Paekākāriki-Raumati Ward
- Community: Paraparaumu Community; Raumati Community
- Electorates: Kapiti; Te Tai Hauāuru (Māori)

Government
  - Territorial Authority: Kāpiti Coast District Council
  - Regional council: Greater Wellington Regional Council
  - Kāpiti Coast Mayor: Janet Holborow
  - Kapiti MP: Tim Costley
  - Te Tai Hauāuru MP: Debbie Ngarewa-Packer

Area
  - Total: 3.17 km^{2} (1.22 sq mi)

Population (June 2025)
  - Total: 5,420
  - Density: 1,710/km^{2} (4,430/sq mi)
- Postcode(s): 5032
- Area code: 04

Raumati Beach is a beach community on the Kāpiti Coast of New Zealand's North Island; located 60km north-west of Wellington, and about 2 km north of Raumati South. It is immediately to the south-west of the larger town of Paraparaumu. The Maungakotukutuku area is located immediately behind Raumati.

"Raumati" is the Māori language word for "summer".

Following the laying out of Raumati Beach as a seaside resort in 1908, the first general store was built in Raumati Beach in 1919.

The town has many landmarks including Kāpiti College, in which Peter Jackson (New Zealand filmmaker) and Christian Cullen (Rugby Union footballer) received their education, St. Mark's Church, the vast sandy beach (popular for walks, fishing and people on holiday), Raumati Beach Shopping Village, Kapiti Island and Weka Park.

The Wharemauku Stream meets the sea in Raumati Beach on the northern side of Raumati Marine Gardens. This park is a popular recreation location: it features a ridable miniature railway. The Beach offers a boat ramp and a tractor is on offer from the Raumati Fishing Club.

During the year several large events are held at Raumati Beach including the Raumati Beach Surf Casting competition which attracts hundreds of fisherman from all around New Zealand. The Kapiti Woman's Triathlon is also held annually within the Marine Gardens and attracts large crowds and is well supported.

== Demographics ==
Raumati Beach covers 3.17 km^{2} (1.22 sq mi) and had an estimated population of 5,420 as of June 2025, with a population density of 1,710 people per km^{2}.

Historical population
Year	Pop.	±% p.a.
2006	4,470	—
2013	4,848	+1.17%
2018	5,241	+1.57%
2023	5,253	+0.05%

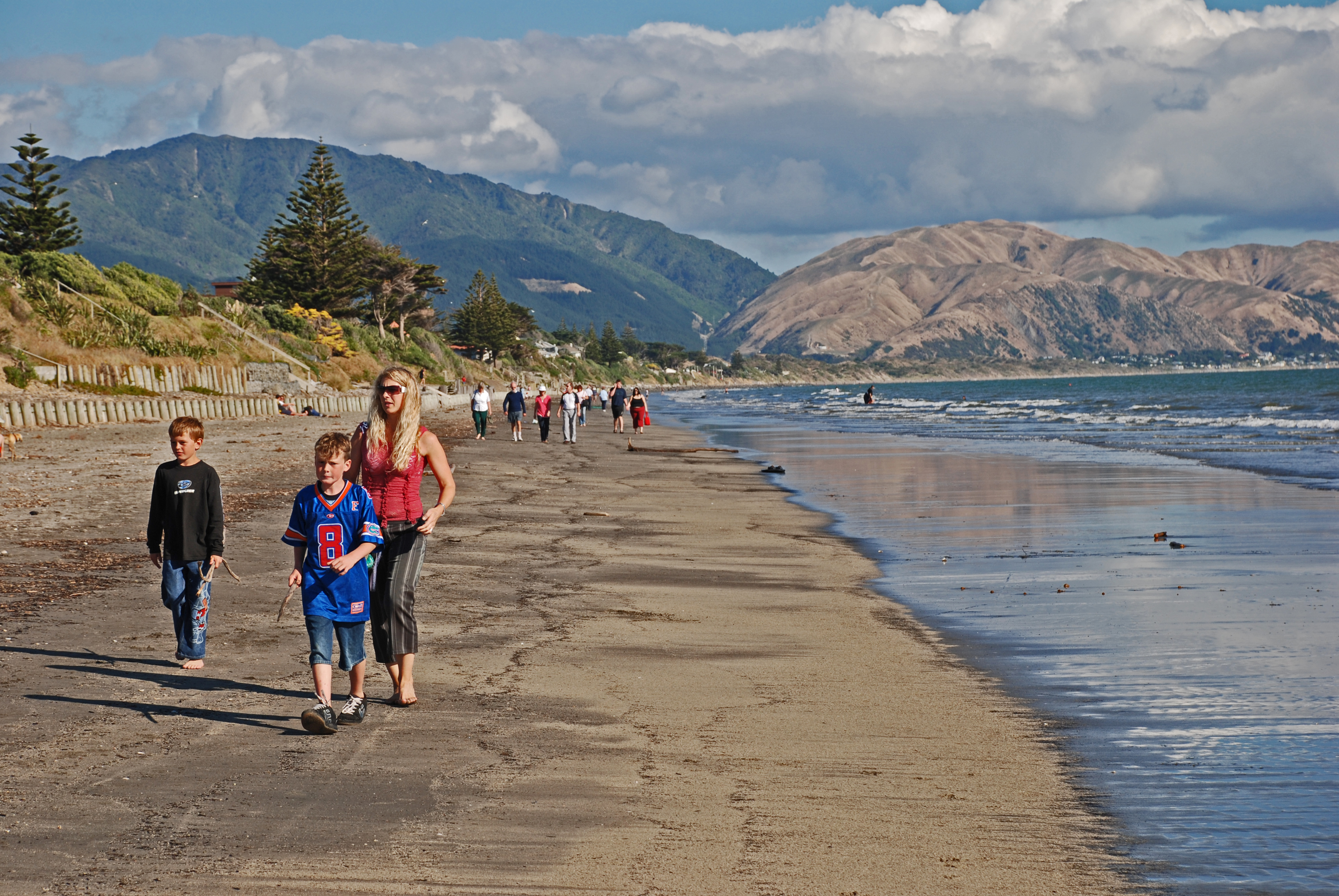
Raumati Beach facing south

Raumati Beach had a population of 5,253 in the 2023 New Zealand census, an increase of 12 people (0.2%) since the 2018 census, and an increase of 405 people (8.4%) since the 2013 census. There were 2,463 males, 2,775 females, and 21 people of other genders in 2,172 dwellings. 4.1% of people identified as LGBTIQ+. There were 906 people (17.2%) aged under 15 years, 786 (15.0%) aged 15 to 29, 2,292 (43.6%) aged 30 to 64, and 1,275 (24.3%) aged 65 or older.

People could identify as more than one ethnicity. The results were 89.8% European (Pākehā); 12.4% Māori; 3.1% Pasifika; 6.2% Asian; 1.0% Middle Eastern, Latin American and African New Zealanders (MELAA); and 2.9% other, which includes people giving their ethnicity as "New Zealander". English was spoken by 98.1%, Māori by 2.3%, Samoan by 0.5%, and other languages by 9.0%. No language could be spoken by 1.5% (e.g. too young to talk). New Zealand Sign Language was known by 0.8%. The percentage of people born overseas was 24.8, compared with 28.8% nationally.

Religious affiliations were 29.4% Christian, 0.5% Hindu, 0.5% Islam, 0.3% Māori religious beliefs, 0.7% Buddhist, 0.5% New Age, 0.2% Jewish, and 1.4% other religions. People who answered that they had no religion were 60.2%, and 6.6% of people did not answer the census question.

Of those at least 15 years old, 1,269 (29.2%) people had a bachelor's or higher degree, 2,277 (52.4%) had a post-high school certificate or diploma, and 807 (18.6%) people exclusively held high school qualifications. 726 people (16.7%) earned over $100,000 compared to 12.1% nationally. The employment status of those at least 15 was 1,965 (45.2%) full-time, 666 (15.3%) part-time, and 123 (2.8%) unemployed.

Individual statistical areas
Name	Area (km^{2})	Population	Density (per km^{2})	Dwellings	Median age	Median income
Raumati Beach West	1.75	2,934	1,677	1,194	45.6 years	$45,600
Raumati Beach East	1.42	2,319	1,633	978	47.2 years	$35,700
New Zealand					38.1 years	$41,500

The demographics for Raumati Beach are also incorporated in Paraparaumu#Demographics.

== Sports and parks ==
Weka Park is a public park in Raumati Beach. It is the home ground of the local soccer team, Kapiti Coast United. Cricket is also played at the park, and it has a children's playground. The Wharemauku Stream flows along the boundary of the park, and a walking track leaves the park and follows the stream to Rimu Road, a length of approximately 3 kilometres (2 mi).

The Kapiti Bears and Kapiti Coast Rugby League Club is on the border of Raumati South and Raumati Beach. The Club was founded in the 1970s and was the home of Kiwi and Melbourne Storm player, now Kiwi coach Stephen Kearney. The Club operates out of Matthews Park, Menin Road, and is affiliated to the Wellington Rugby League Zone.

The local football club, Kapiti Coast United, plays at Weka Park in Raumati Beach.

== Education ==
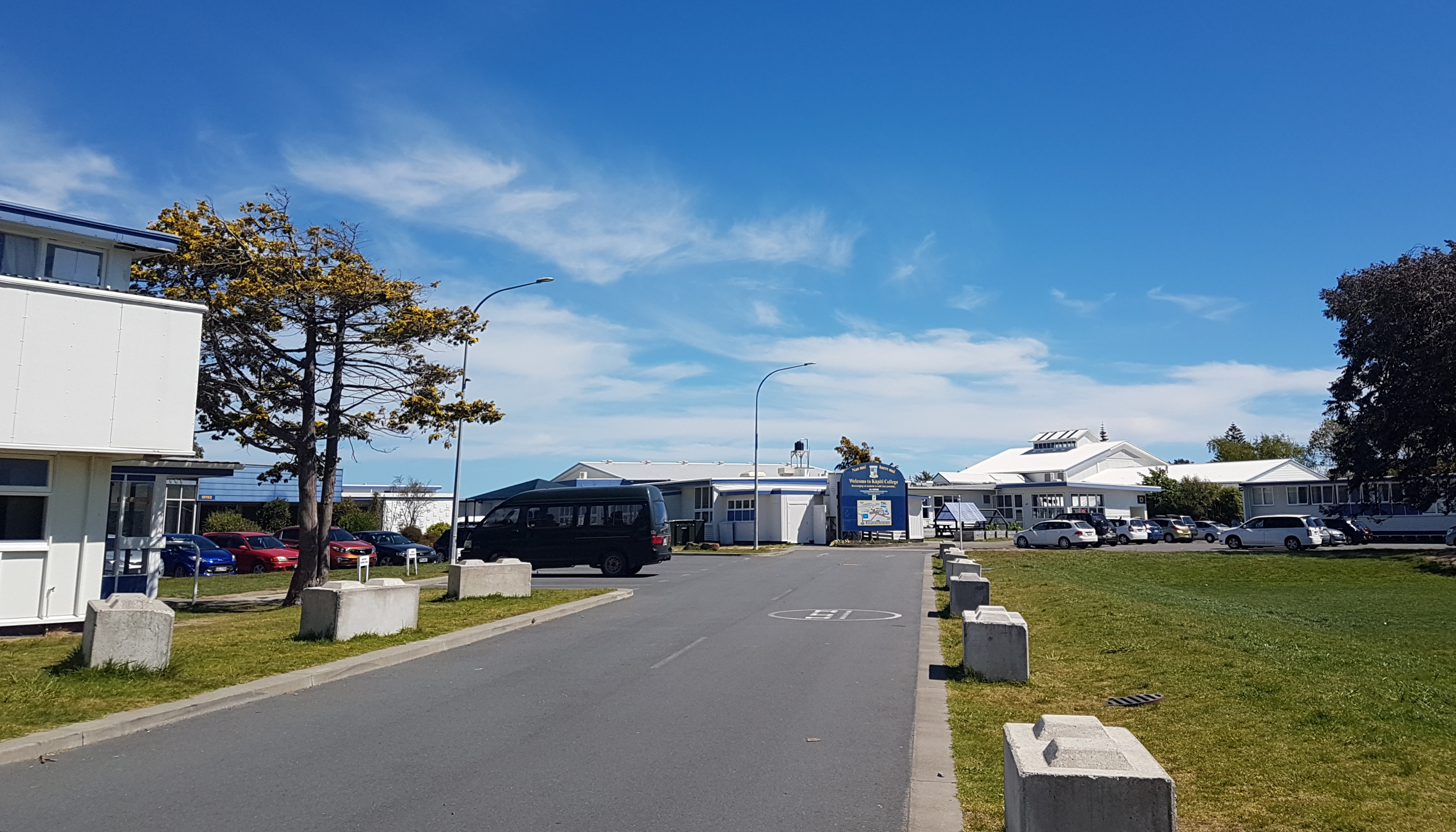
Kāpiti College

Raumati Beach School is a state primary school for Year 1 to 8 students, with a roll of 516 as of July 2026. A Raumati School opened in 1953.

Kāpiti College is a state secondary school for Year 9 to 13 students, with a roll of 1,389. It opened in 1954 as Raumati District High School, and renamed to Kāpiti College in 1958.

Both these schools are co-educational. Rolls are as of July 2026.
