= Raumati Marine Gardens =

Park in Raumati Beach, New Zealand

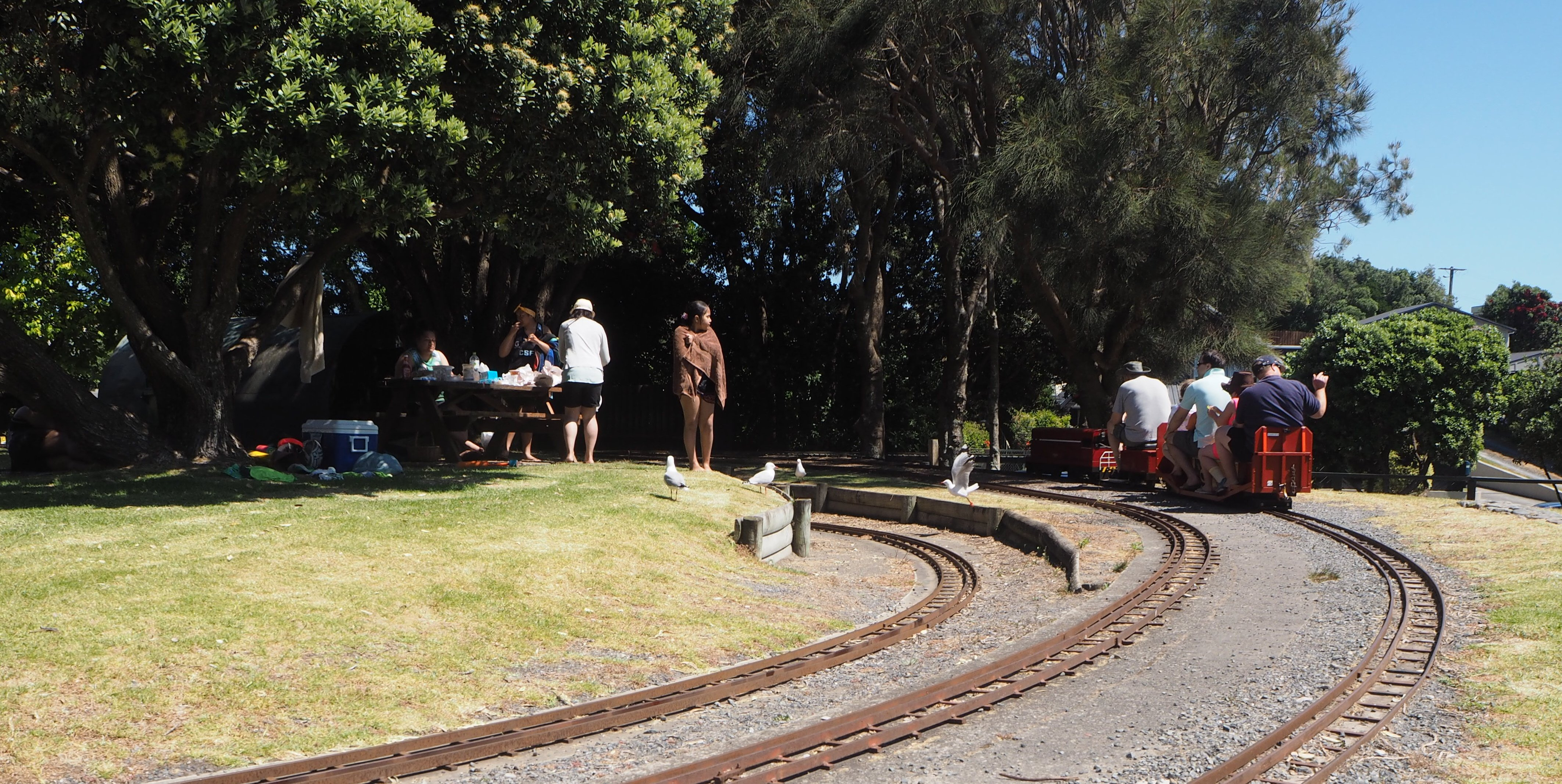
- Train tracks in Raumati Marine Gardens
- Interactive map of Raumati Marine Gardens
- Type: Public park
- Location: Raumati Beach, Kāpiti Coast District, New Zealand
- Coordinates: 40.9183°S 174.9799°E
- Operator: Kāpiti Coast District Council
- Status: Open year round

Raumati Marine Gardens is a public park in Raumati Beach on New Zealand's Kāpiti Coast. It is near the Tasman Sea just behind the beach, hence its name, and on the northern side of the park, the Wharemauku Stream reaches the ocean.

== Description ==
The Gardens are a popular recreation location for locals and visitors from nearby towns. The park includes an outdoor ridable miniature railway operated by Kapiti Miniature Railway and Associates. It features a dual gauge (5 inch and 7¼ inch) circuit that has been progressively upgraded and expanded over the years and features bridges and tunnels. Trains operate Sunday afternoons and motive power includes live steam, internal combustion, and battery electric. An indoor HO scale model railway was built beside the outdoor railway's main station in the early 1990s but was closed early in the 21st century.

The Gardens also contains a children's playground with splash pad. The heated indoor swimming pool complex that is the main public pools for Paraparaumu, Paraparaumu Beach, Raumati Beach, and Raumati South has moved to the Paraparaumu Aquatic Centre near the Coastlands Complex.
