= Wharemauku Stream =

Stream on New Zealand's North Island

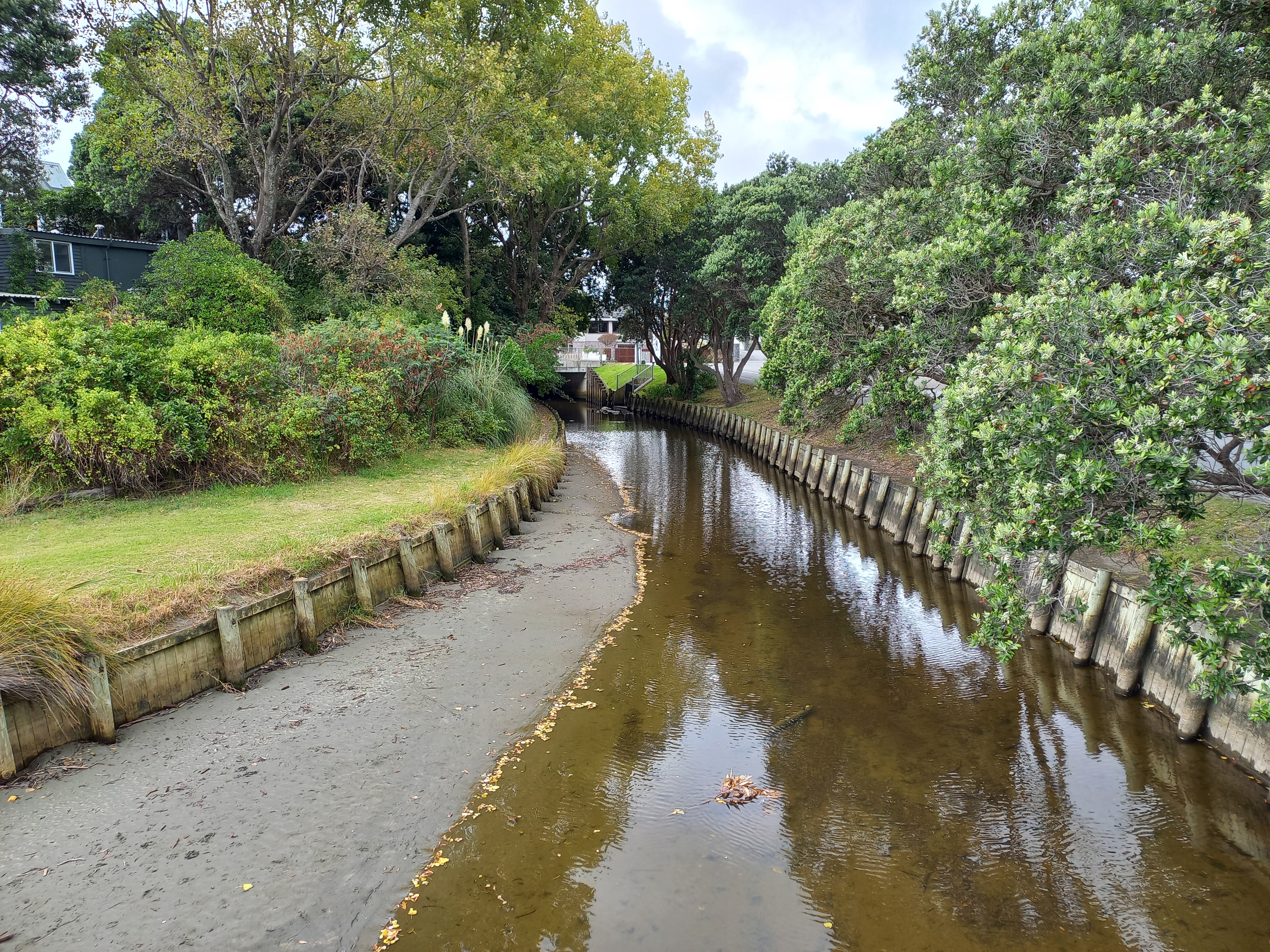
- Route of the Wharemauku Stream
- Mouth of the Wharemauku Stream Wharemauku Stream (North Island)
- Native name: Te Manga o Wharemaukū (Māori)

Location
- Country: New Zealand

Physical characteristics
- Source
  - location: Mataihuka
  - coordinates: 40.94391°S 174.99762°E
- Mouth
  - location: Rauoterangi Channel
  - coordinates: 40°55′02″S 174°58′41″E

Basin features
- Progression: Wharemauku Stream → Rauoterangi Channel → South Taranaki Bight → Tasman Sea
- Landmarks: Kaitawa Reserve, Paraparaumu, Raumati Beach

The Wharemauku Stream is a stream on the Kāpiti Coast of New Zealand's North Island. Its headwaters are in the Maungakotukutuku valley, and it flows through Paraparaumu and Raumati Beach before reaching the Tasman Sea on the northern side of Raumati Marine Gardens. From its headwaters to the sea, it passes through Kapiti Golf Course, Kaitawa Reserve, under the North Island Main Trunk railway and the former State Highway 1, Coastlands shopping centre, part of Paraparaumu Airport, and Weka Park. Many small nameless streams meet the Wharemauku Stream, and a walking track approximately 3 kilometres (2 mi) long follows it from Rimu Road to Weka Park.

== See also ==
- List of rivers of Wellington Region
- List of rivers of New Zealand
