= Rauoterangi Channel =

Strait between the North Island and Kapiti Island in New Zealand

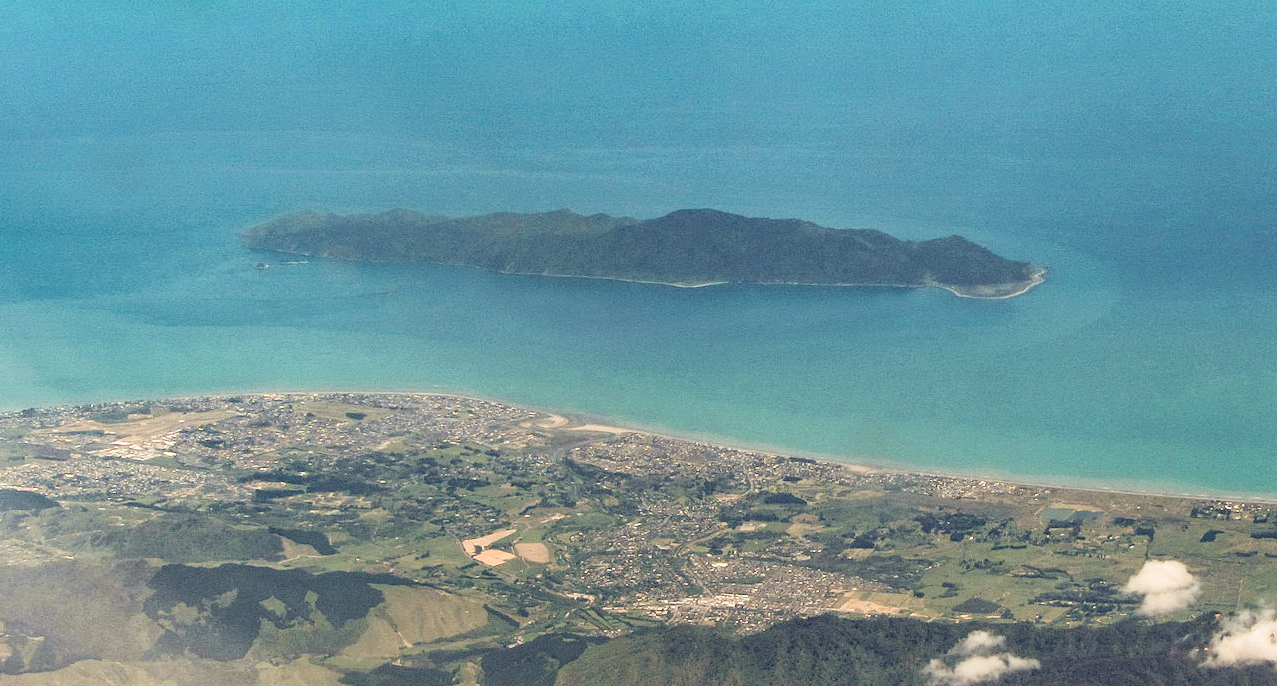
- Aerial view of the Rauoterangi Channel between Kapiti Island and the Kāpiti Coast

- Location within New Zealand
- Coordinates: 40.876°S 174.949°E
- Primary inflows: Waikanae River, Wharemauku Stream
- Basin countries: New Zealand
- Islands: Motungārara Island / Fishermans Island, Passage Rocks, Tahoramaurea Island / Browns Island, Tokomāpuna Island / Aeroplane Island, White Rocks

The Rauoterangi Channel, also known as the Otaheke Strait, is a channel that separates Kapiti Island from the Kāpiti Coast of the North Island in New Zealand.

== Geography ==
Rauoterangi Channel sits between Kapiti Island and the Kāpiti Coast settlements of Waikanae Beach and Paraparaumu Beach. The channel is 5.6 km (3.5 mi) wide, up to 70 m (230 ft) deep, and typically has strong ocean currents. The western side of the channel is dominated by rocky reefs, from which a number of small islands emerge. These include Motungārara Island / Fishermans Island, Passage Rocks, Tahoramaurea Island / Browns Island, Tokomāpuna Island / Aeroplane Island and White Rocks.

The modern channel began forming when sea levels began to rise after the end of the Last Glacial Maximum, approximately 7,000 years ago.

Much of the channel is situated in the Kapiti Marine Reserve.

== Biodiversity ==
The channel is known for whale migrations, and is a habitat for species including blue cod, butterflyfish, pāua and crayfish.

== History ==
The channel is named after Kahe Te Rau-o-te-rangi, a Ngāti Toa chieftainess who swam the length of the channel in 1824 in order to warn people on the mainland of a potential attack.

== Transport ==
The Kapiti Island Ferry traverses the Rauoterangi Channel, between Paraparaumu Beach and Kapiti Island.
