= Kapiti Island =

Island off the Kāpiti Coast of New Zealand

Te Waewae-Kapiti-o-Tara-rāua-ko-Rangitāne
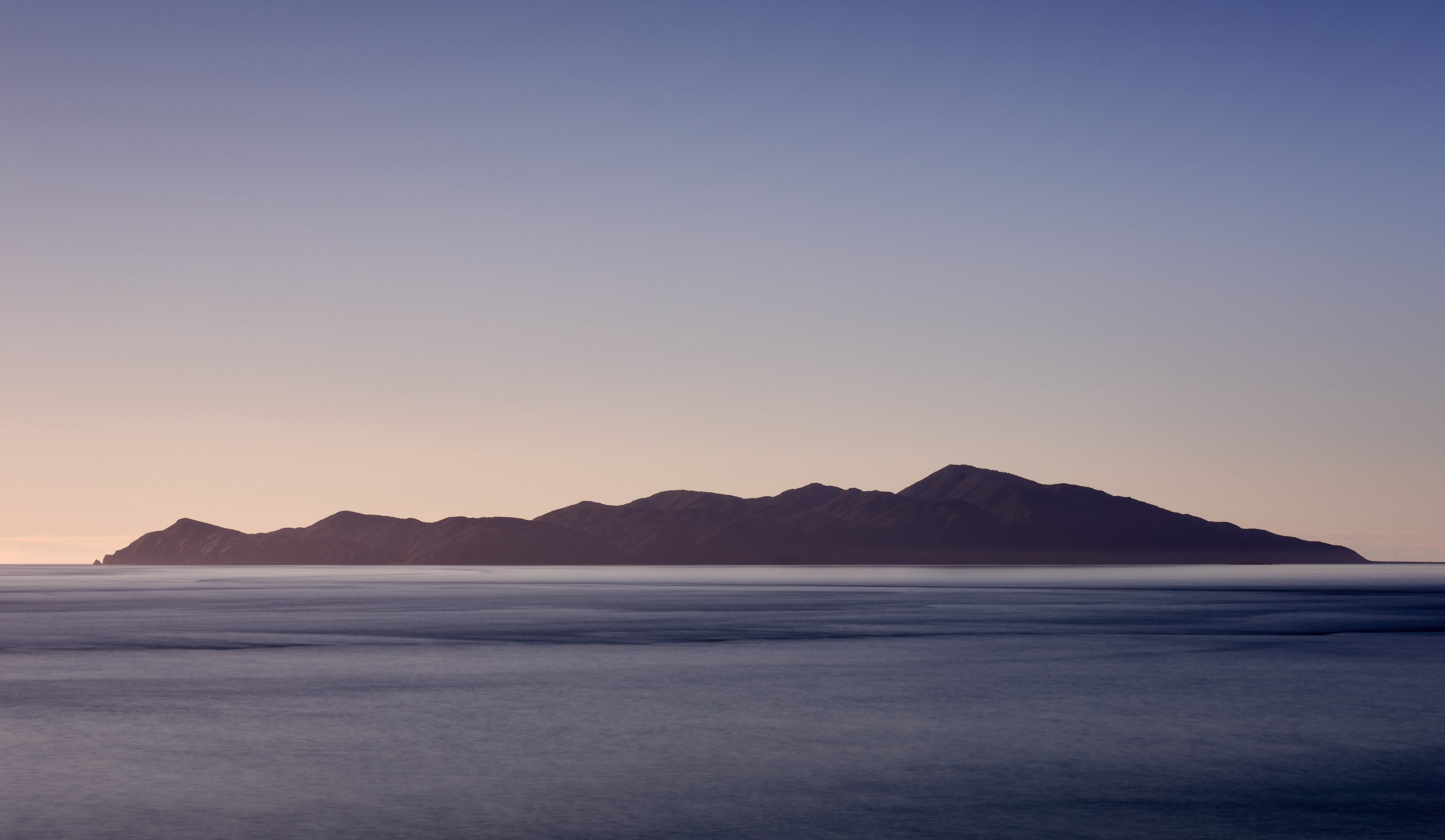
- View of Kapiti Island from Pukerua Bay

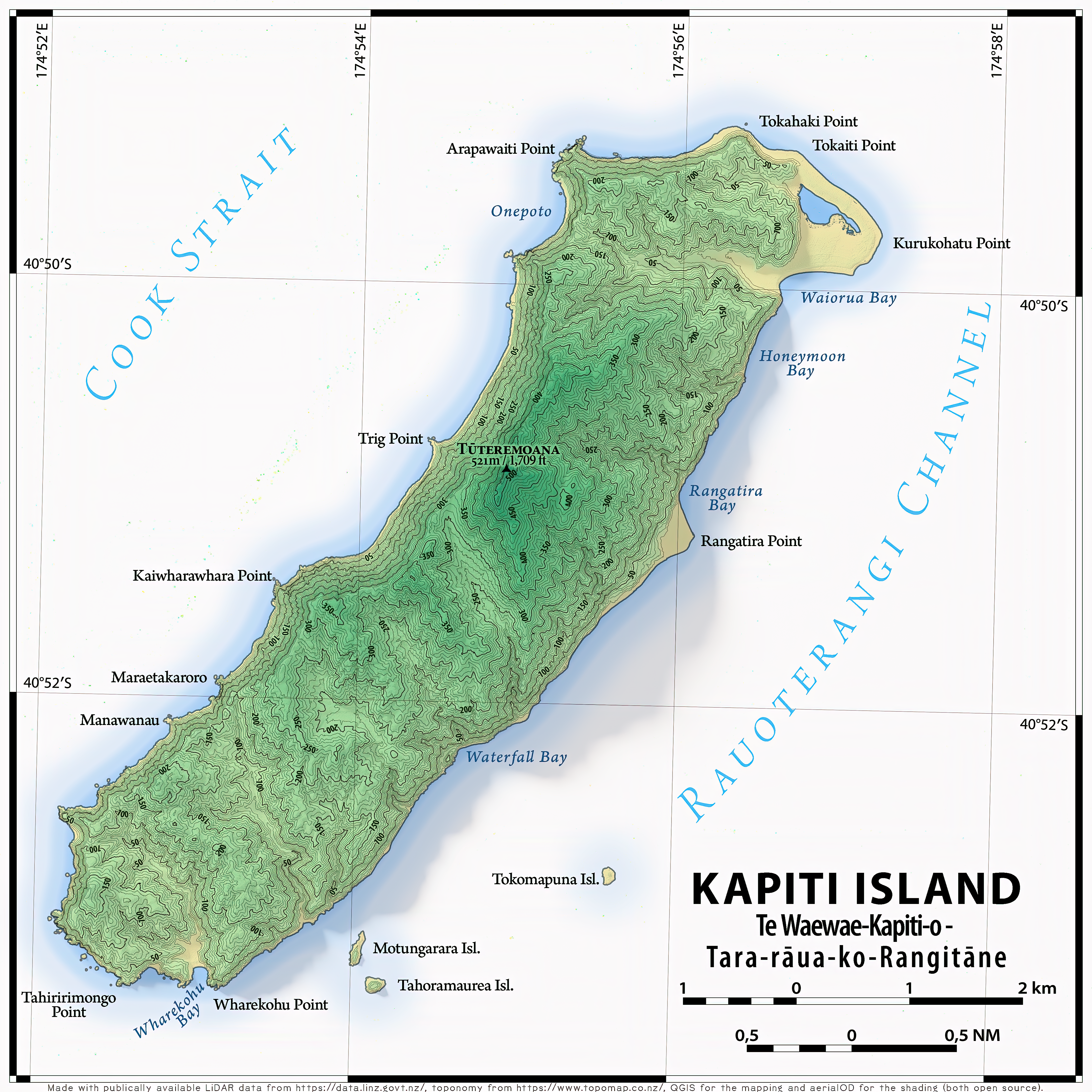
- Topographic map of Kapiti Island

- Location within New Zealand

Geography
- Location: Tasman Sea
- Coordinates: 40°51′18″S 174°54′54″E
- Area: 19.65 km^{2} (7.59 sq mi)
- Length: 8 km (5 mi)
- Width: 2 km (1.2 mi)
- Highest elevation: 521 m (1709 ft)
- Highest point: Tūteremoana

Administration
- New Zealand
- Region: Greater Wellington
- Territorial authority: Kāpiti Coast District

Kapiti Island ([kɑːpiti]), sometimes written as Kāpiti Island, is an island nature reserve located 5.6 km (3 mi) off the west coast of the lower North Island of New Zealand and within the Kāpiti Coast District. Parts of the island were previously farmed, but it is now a predator-free sanctuary for endemic birds, including many endangered birds. The island is 10 km (6.2 mi) long, running southwest/northeast, and roughly 2 km (1.2 mi) wide, being more or less rectangular in shape, and has an area of 19.65 km^{2} (7.59 sq mi).

The island is separated from the North Island by the Rauoterangi Channel. The highest point on the island is Tūteremoana, 521 m (1,709 ft). The seaward (west) side of the island is particularly rocky and has high cliffs, some hundreds of metres high, that drop straight into the sea. The cliffs are subject to very strong prevailing westerly winds and the scrubby vegetation that grows there is low and stunted by the harsh environmental conditions. A cross-section of the island would show almost a right-angled triangle, revealing its origins from lying on a fault line (part of the same ridge as the Tararua Range). The island's vegetation is dominated by scrub and forest of kohekohe, tawa, and kanuka. Most of the forest is regenerating after years of burn-offs and farming, but some areas of original bush remain, with 30 m (98 ft) trees.

== Name and etymology ==
The full original name for the island is Te Waewae-Kapiti-o-Tara-rāua-ko-Rangitāne, meaning "the boundary of Tara and Rangitāne" and referring to it as a place where the rohe (territories) of Ngāi Tara (now known as Muaūpoko) and Rangitāne (descendents of Whātonga) iwi adjoined each other. The word kapiti (meaning 'to be joined') is spelt without a macron, and is unrelated to the word kāpiti (cabbage). The island does not have an official name, but is recorded on topographical maps and hence in the New Zealand Gazetteer as Kapiti Island. In 2010 the Māori Language Commission acknowledged that, while the ordinary word kapiti does not have a macron, iwi of the Kāpiti region have evidence from history and local pronunciation that the place name is a variant form of āpiti, and that Kāpiti (with a macron) is correct. In the past, it was sometimes spelt Capiti Island.

The island also became known by Māori as Motu Rongonui, or the "famous island". When James Cook visited New Zealand during his 1770 survey, he called it Entry Island or Entry Isle, but Cook's name did not come into common use.

== History ==
The Kāpiti Coast region has been occupied by Māori since the 12th century. Around the year 1150, Māori navigator Whātonga of the waka Kurahaupō divided the country into two sections: land from the southern tip of Kapiti Island north was given to his son Tautoki and his ancestors, who became Rangitāne iwi, and from the southern tip south was given to his son Tara and ancestors (Ngāi Tara, now known as Muaūpoko). The traditional name for the island refers to this division between Ngāi Tara and Rangitāne.

The island was surveyed in 1770 during the first voyage of James Cook. In the early 1800s, the island was in the rohe of Muaūpoko. Te Rauparaha of Ngāti Toa saw the advantage of settling on Kapiti Island, after noticing how Western ships frequented the Cook Strait area, who would be good trading partners. In 1821, amid pressure from tribes in the Waikato, Te Rauparaha led a migration of Ngāti Toa from Kawhia Harbour to the Cook Strait, and went on to settle on the Kapiti Coast and Waikanae in 1822, securing it and the island from Muaūpoko in 1823. The tribe regularly sailed in canoes on raiding journeys up to the Whanganui River and down to Marlborough. In response to these actions, several local iwi combined forces and attempted to drive Ngāti Toa from the area. This culminated in the 1824 Battle of Waiorua, in which Ngāti Toa destroyed a combined fleet from local iwi who had landed at the northern end of Kapiti in an attempt to capture the island.

Te Rauparaha encouraged European ships to visit Kapiti, which by 1830 became a centre for the New Zealand flax trade. By 1850, no members of Ngāti Toa permanently lived on the island, but occasionally visited for the island's resources.

=== Ownership ===
Ownership of the island, and nearby Mana Island, reverted to Ngāti Toa on 31 December 2024 under a Treaty of Waitangi settlement.

=== Whaling ===
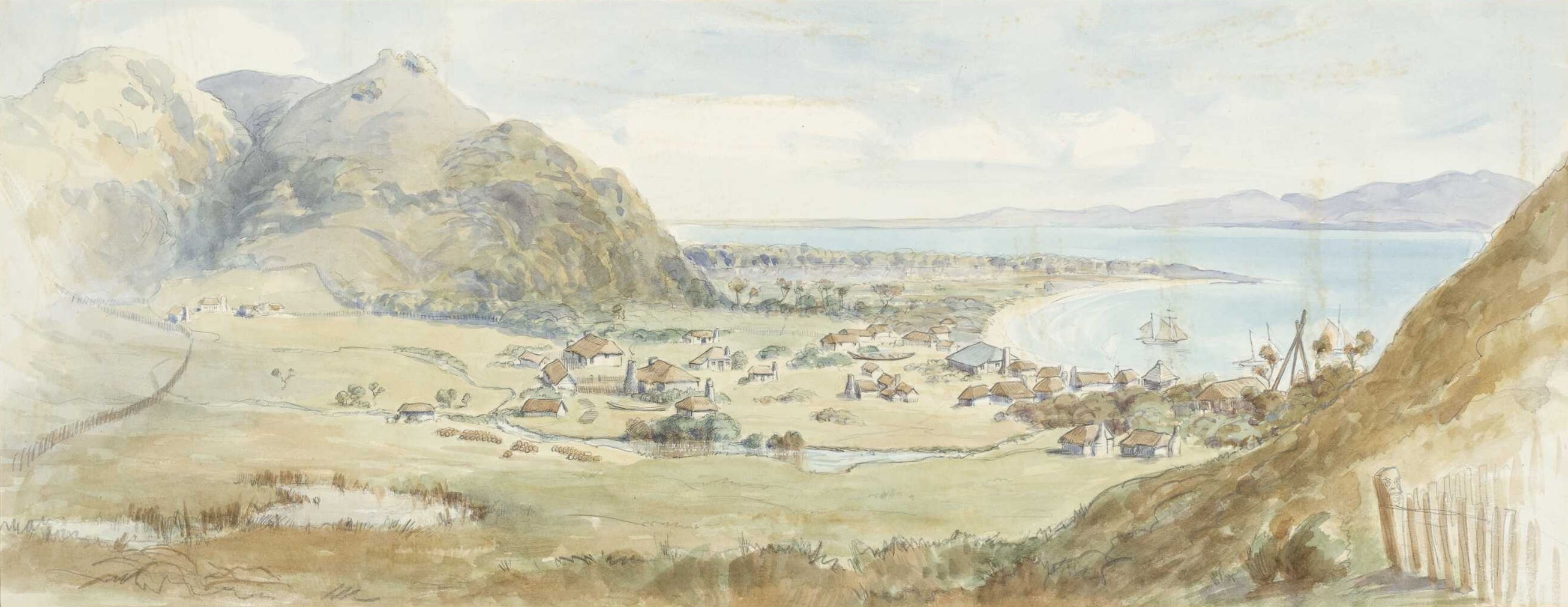
View of Jillett's Whaling Station on Waiorua Beach in 1844. Drawn by Walter Armiger Bowring in 1907, based on an original sketch by John Alexander Gilfillan

In the 1830s and 1840s, the island became one of the most developed areas in the country for whaling, due to the South Taranaki Bight and Cook Strait being whale nurseries. During whaling times 2,000 people were based on the island. There were seven whaling stations in and around Kapiti Island. Oil was melted from the blubber and shipped to America for use in machinery before petroleum was used. Five whaling stations were established on Kapiti, with three additional stations on the offshore islets of Tokomāpuna Island / Aeroplane Island, Motungārara Island / Fishermans Island and Tahoramaurea Island / Browns Island to the south-east. The whaling station on Waiorua Bay was surrounded by a "rough township".

After the collapse of the whaling industry in the 1840s, whalers and their families left the island.

=== Deforestation and farming ===
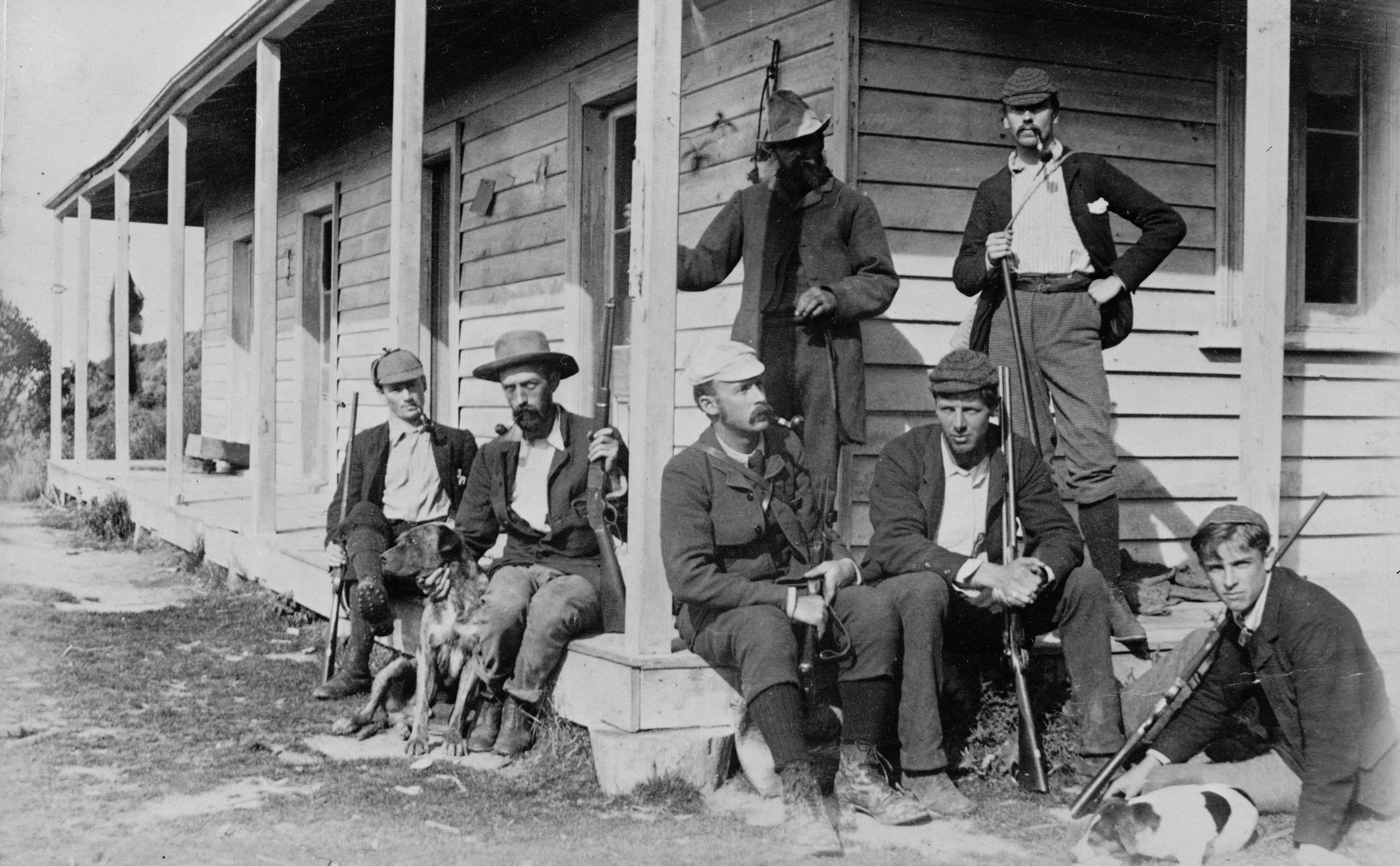
Hunters on Kapiti Island in the 1890s

The island was originally forested with rātā, kahikatea and rimu. Between 1825 and 1840 part of the island's vegetation was burned to allow for farming. Between 1874 and the 1890s, the Māori Land Court partitioned the island into blocks, primarily owned by Western Maori MP Wiremu Parata and his family members. In the 1890s, the Wellington Acclimatisation Society requested that Alfred Ross, a leaseholder and sheep farmer on the island, turn his farm into a game reserve, releasing quail, pheasants and later brushtail possums onto the island.

By the 1900s, most of the island had been acquired by the New Zealand government for the reserve, except for a section in the north. As the land at the north end could no longer be leased to European farmers, it was farmed directly by Ngāti Toa as a sheep farm by the Webber family. The Webber family continued to farm on the island until the 1950s, most land being sold in 1967, however Ngāti Toa retain some land and rights of access to the island.

=== Wildlife reserve ===
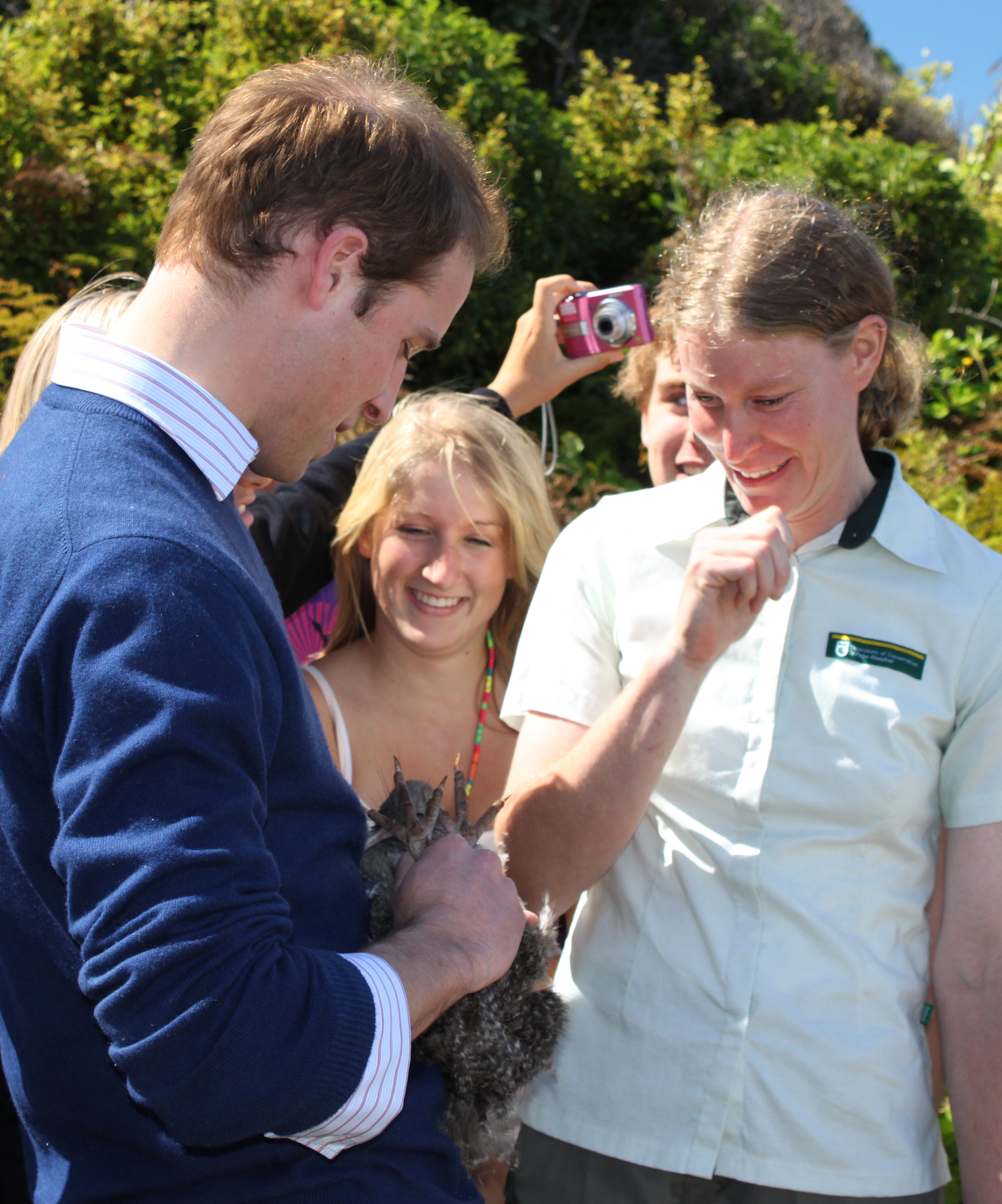
William, Prince of Wales holding a kiwi at a Department of Conservation event in 2010

Kapiti Island was identified in 1870 as a possible site for creating a bird sanctuary. By 1895, the government had begun considering making Kapiti Island into a wildlife reserve, due to the losses in native flora and fauna caused by introduced predators and deforestation across mainland New Zealand. Parata and his family members protested these plans, and in 1896 stated that they had no intention of selling the land to the government – by this time, Kapiti Island was the only part of the Ngāti Toa rohe still in Māori ownership. The Kapiti Island Public Reserve Act 1897 prohibited any further private sales of land on the island, and provided the basis for the island being acquired by the Crown, to be set aside as a nature reserve, with the exception of land still held by original Māori owners or their descendants.

In 1893 a pair of the now-extinct huia were going to be sent to Kapiti Island, but were instead taken to England as a present for Lord Rothschild. Suggestions were also made to move now-extinct South Island piopio to Kapiti Island, or another island, but this did not happen due to difficulty capturing the birds.

In 1924, the New Zealand Native Birds Protection Society (predecessor of the Royal Forest and Bird Protection Society), reported that there had been a significant improvement in the condition of the island, following a reduction in the number of animals. In 1928, goats were eradicated, which was followed by the eradication or eviction of cats, deer, sheep, cattle, pigs, and dogs.

In 1987 the Department of Conservation (DOC) took over administration of the island. In the 1980s and 1990s efforts were made to return the island to a natural state. First, sheep and possums were removed (over 22,500 possums were killed), then, in an action few thought possible for an island of its size, rats were eradicated by an aerial application of brodifacoum through September and October 1996. Ranger Peter Winston Daniel, who between 1980 and 1987 coordinated the programme which eradicated the pests, was recognised in the 1990 New Year Honours. The island was declared free of mammalian predators in 1999. In 2003 the anonymous Biodiversity Action Group claimed to have released 11 possums on the island, but no evidence of such were found.

Ngāti Toa Rangatira and Ātiawa ki Whakarongotai work with the Department of Conservation to guide conservation efforts on the island.

== Flora and fauna ==
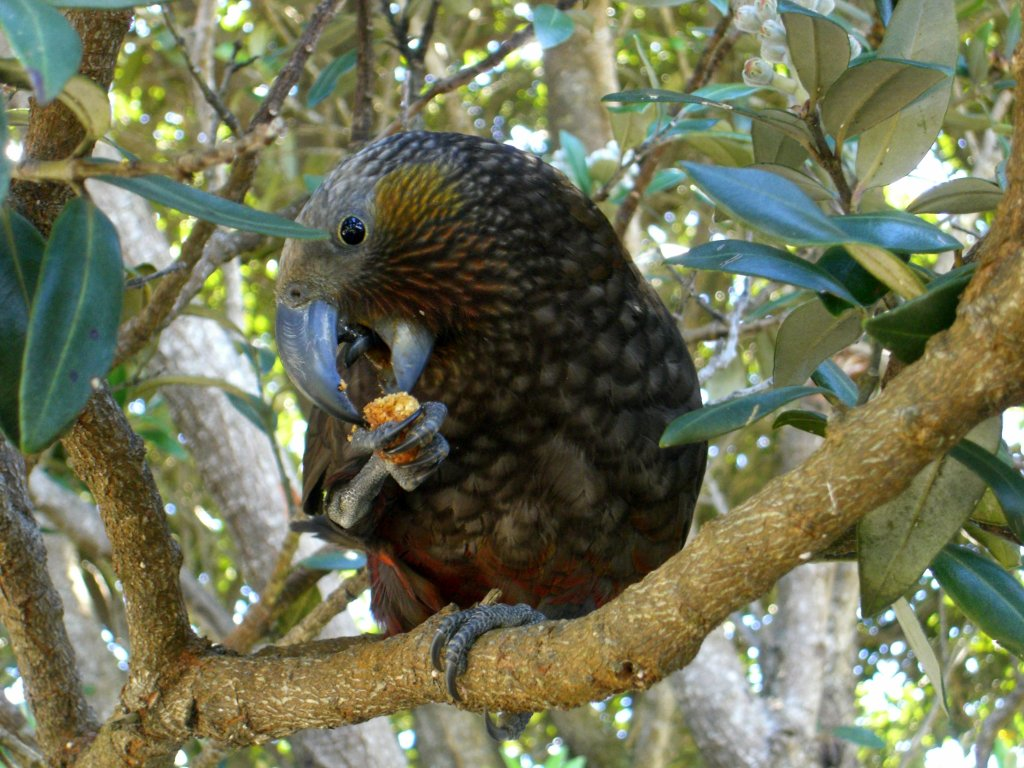
A kākā on Kapiti Island

=== Forest and vegetation ===
Currently 28% of Kapiti Island's land area is covered by mixed forest and another 22% is covered by kanuka scrub forest. The most widespread forest types are kohekohe and tawa.

On 14 June 2007, one of the buildings at the Department of Conservation ranger station caught fire, sparking a major emergency operation to prevent the spread of fire to the native bush. Thirty firefighters were flown to the island and managed to contain the blaze, preventing serious damage to the ecosystem.

=== Birds ===
The island is home to a number of native bird species, mostly re-introduced. These include the takahē, North Island kōkako, brown teal (pāteke), stitchbird (hihi), North Island saddleback (tīeke), tomtit (miromiro), fantail (piwakawaka), morepork (ruru), North Island robin (toutouwai) and a hybrid population of North Island and western weka. Five little spotted kiwi were translocated from the South Island to Kapiti Island in 1912. There are currently 1,200 little spotted kiwi on Kapiti Island, which until recently were thought extinct on the mainland. On 12 October 1912, three kākāpō were released on Kapiti Island. Rat eradication has led to increases in red-fronted parakeets, North Island robins, bellbirds, and saddlebacks. The island is considered one of New Zealand's most important sites for bird recovery, and a breeding site for seabirds such as the sooty shearwater (tītī). However, sooty shearwaters have been under threat on the island because of predation by weka. Other birds that use the island for breeding include the spotted shag.

Kapiti Island is home to a small population of hybrid brown kiwi. In 1908, Richard Henry released a pair of tokoeka onto the island. Later in 1923, 7 kiwi were released from the Whanganui region, with a further two North Island brown kiwi being released. The brown kiwi have subsequently hybridized and have formed a small population between 50-100 birds.

Kapiti Island is one of Wellington region's "coastal habitats of significance for indigenous birds". It provides predator-free nesting habitat to little blue penguins, red-billed gulls, white-fronted terns and reef herons. A further four Nationally Threatened or At Risk species occur on the coast of Kapiti Island – the black shag, Caspian tern, pied shag and variable oystercatcher.

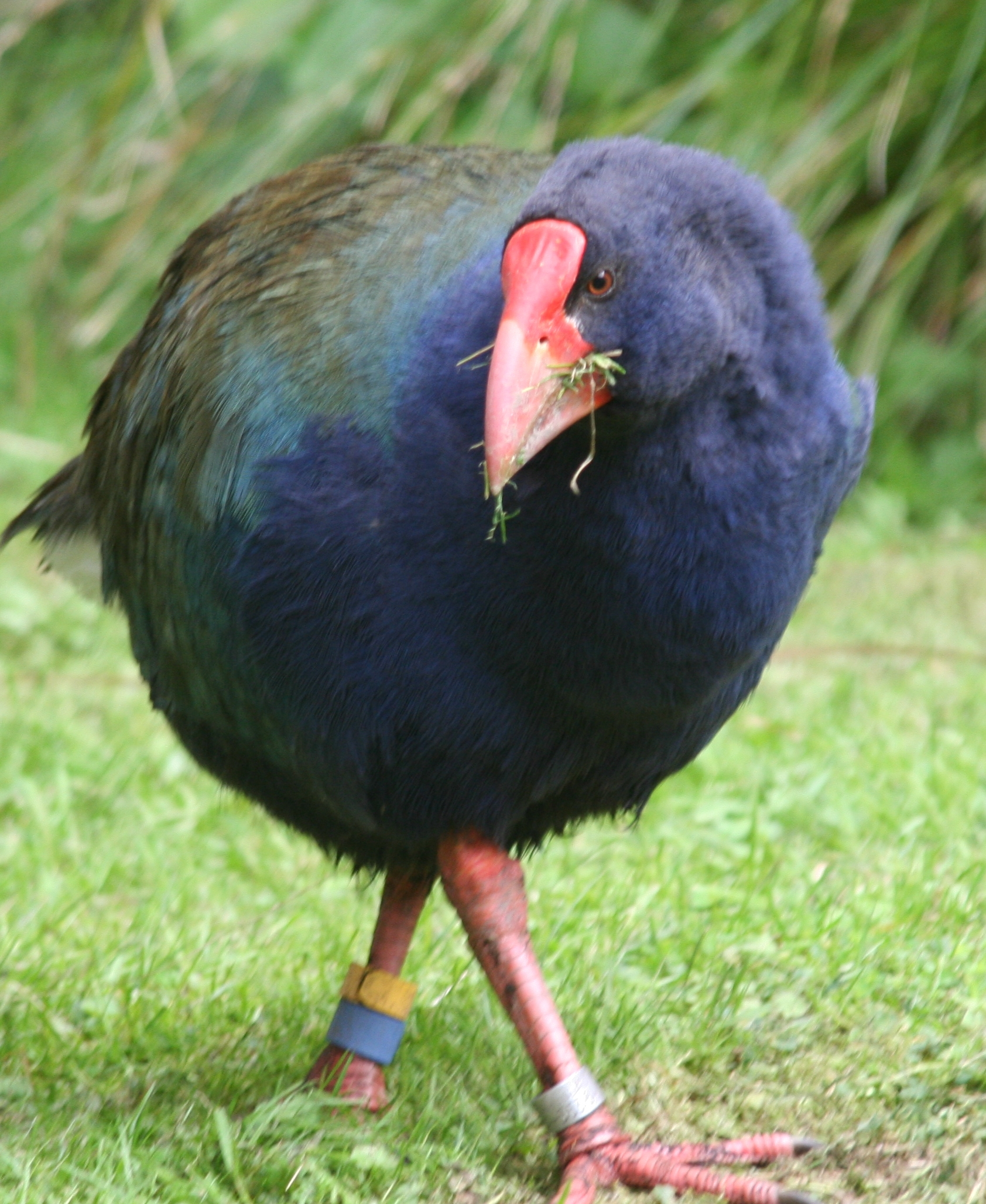
Takahē on Kapiti Island

North Island saddlebacks have been translocated from the Hauraki Gulf to Kapiti Island since 1981. The mean annual population growth rate for saddlebacks on Kapiti Island since 1998 has been 33%.

Between 1991 and 1997, 32 North Island kōkako were translocated to Kapiti Island. Between December 1991 and April 1994, 12 adults came from Te Rauamoa (four), Hauturu (one), Manawahe (five), and Makino (two). Between June 1995 and March 1996, seven kōkako came from Little Barrier Island. Five came from Mapara Wildlife Reserve in 1996, and eight came from the breeding programme of Pukaha / Mount Bruce National Wildlife Centre between 1994 and 1997. All the birds were banded. Five years later, the population of kōkako on the island was 39, and 10 of 32 translocated kōkako had survived. Between 2021 and 2023, a further 35 kōkako were translocated to the island, in an attempt to increase the population's genetic diversity.

=== Lizards ===
The island is home to a number of lizard species, including the Oligosoma polychroma, brown skink, copper skink, common gecko, ornate skink, forest gecko, and Wellington green gecko. After the eradication of pests, the population of some of these multiplied by rates between 2 times and 28 times. Gold-striped geckos were discovered on Kapiti Island in 2013.

=== Bats ===
New Zealand long-tailed bats live on Kapiti. Twenty southern lesser short-tailed bats were translocated from the Tararua Range to Kapiti Island by the Department of Conservation in April 2005, but they suffered health problems and the translocation was unsuccessful. As of 1969, bats have only been observed in the eastern side of the island. In February 1969 an attempt was made to locate the long-tailed bat colony. For four nights, mist nets were placed in the Te Rere burial caves, and hollow trees were examined along with more burial caves. These efforts went unsuccessful, and the colony was not found, despite sightings of bats in this time period.

=== Invertebrates ===
Invertebrates on the island include cave wētā, Kapiti ground wētā, cicada, Lycaena salustius, pūriri moth, tunnel web spider, stick insect, ngāokeoke and the giraffe weevil.

=== Introduced predators ===
In 1999, the Minister of Conservation declared that the island was free of rats and other mammalian predators. The island has over 200 traps for rodents and mustelids.

A stoat, an introduced mustelid responsible for decimating the bird life in New Zealand, was seen on the island in December 2010, and by August the next year the Department of Conservation had removed three of them. It is believed that they reached Kapiti Island by a combination of drifting and swimming from the mainland.

=== Marine reserve ===
The Kapiti Marine Reserve was established in 1992. No fishing is allowed in this reserve, but swimming, diving and snorkelling are permitted. The reserve is split into eastern and western sections. The eastern section is 1,825 ha (4,510 acres) and extends from Kapiti Island to the Waikanae Estuary Scientific Reserve. There is a 70 m deep channel with strong currents between the island and the Waikanae coast. Whales were regularly seen in the passage until the 20th century. The western section of the reserve is an area of 342 ha (850 acres) to the west of Kapiti Island, and is known for its pāua and rock lobsters. Other marine life around Kapiti Island includes the common dolphin, New Zealand fur seal, orca, and the eagle ray.

== Climate ==
A weather station at Rangatira Bay measures rainfall, wet and dry-bulb temperatures, wind speed and direction, cloud cover, and visibility. On average, the island experiences 1,064 mm of annual rainfall. February is the warmest month with a mean temperature of 16.9 °C, July is the coldest with a mean of 8.9 °C. Kapiti Island only experiences an average of 0.4 frosts per year. Most wind comes from the north-west. Kapiti's tawa forest is often covered by a cloud cap which causes increased precipitation and soil moisture in the area, and decreased temperature and sunlight.

Climate data for Kapiti Island (1971–2000 normals, extremes 1931–1987)
Month	Jan	Feb	Mar	Apr	May	Jun	Jul	Aug	Sep	Oct	Nov	Dec	Year
Record high °C (°F)	30.3 (86.5)	27.8 (82.0)	27.6 (81.7)	25.6 (78.1)	20.6 (69.1)	18.9 (66.0)	16.7 (62.1)	17.8 (64.0)	21.0 (69.8)	25.8 (78.4)	28.6 (83.5)	26.8 (80.2)	30.3 (86.5)
Mean maximum °C (°F)	25.3 (77.5)	24.9 (76.8)	23.3 (73.9)	20.4 (68.7)	17.6 (63.7)	15.9 (60.6)	14.3 (57.7)	14.8 (58.6)	17.0 (62.6)	18.9 (66.0)	21.1 (70.0)	24.0 (75.2)	26.1 (79.0)
Mean daily maximum °C (°F)	20.9 (69.6)	21.2 (70.2)	19.5 (67.1)	17.0 (62.6)	14.4 (57.9)	12.3 (54.1)	11.7 (53.1)	12.3 (54.1)	14.0 (57.2)	15.8 (60.4)	17.3 (63.1)	19.3 (66.7)	16.3 (61.3)
Daily mean °C (°F)	17.7 (63.9)	18.0 (64.4)	16.6 (61.9)	14.5 (58.1)	12.2 (54.0)	10.3 (50.5)	9.6 (49.3)	10.0 (50.0)	11.4 (52.5)	12.9 (55.2)	14.4 (57.9)	16.3 (61.3)	13.7 (56.6)
Mean daily minimum °C (°F)	14.5 (58.1)	14.8 (58.6)	13.7 (56.7)	12.0 (53.6)	10.0 (50.0)	8.4 (47.1)	7.5 (45.5)	7.6 (45.7)	8.7 (47.7)	10.0 (50.0)	11.4 (52.5)	13.2 (55.8)	11.0 (51.8)
Mean minimum °C (°F)	10.2 (50.4)	10.6 (51.1)	9.4 (48.9)	8.0 (46.4)	5.4 (41.7)	4.3 (39.7)	3.9 (39.0)	4.0 (39.2)	4.6 (40.3)	5.8 (42.4)	7.3 (45.1)	9.0 (48.2)	3.3 (37.9)
Record low °C (°F)	6.1 (43.0)	5.6 (42.1)	3.6 (38.5)	4.7 (40.5)	1.1 (34.0)	−0.6 (30.9)	−0.6 (30.9)	1.1 (34.0)	1.4 (34.5)	2.4 (36.3)	3.9 (39.0)	5.1 (41.2)	−0.6 (30.9)
Average rainfall mm (inches)	62.9 (2.48)	83.0 (3.27)	71.8 (2.83)	90.4 (3.56)	102.4 (4.03)	111.4 (4.39)	97.4 (3.83)	87.9 (3.46)	90.3 (3.56)	104.8 (4.13)	88.5 (3.48)	97.8 (3.85)	1,088.6 (42.87)
Source: NIWA (rain 1981–2010)

== Geology and geography ==
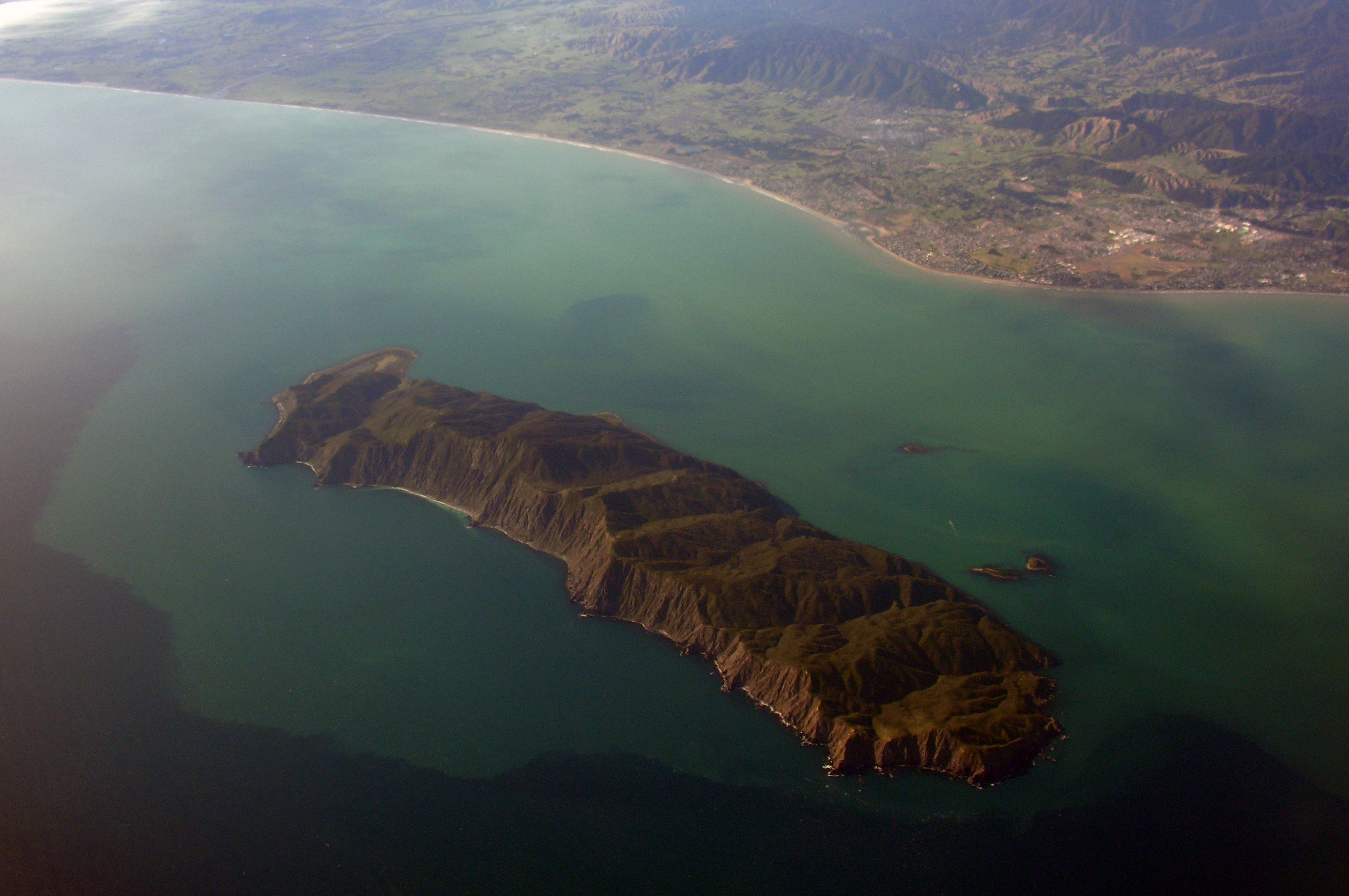
Aerial view of Kapiti Island, with Paraparaumu in the background

Kapiti Island is 10 kilometres (6.2 mi) long and 2 kilometres (1.2 mi) wide, with an area of 1,965 ha (4,860 acres). It is 30 kilometres north of Wellington, and separated from the mainland by the Rauoterangi Channel. Several islets are located in the channel close to island, including Tokomāpuna Island / Aeroplane Island, Tahoramaurea Island / Browns Island and Motungārara Island / Fishermans Island.

There are multiple active fault lines around both sides of Kapiti Island. The western side of Kapiti Island has steep cliffs which were created due to uplift from an offshore fault and waves causing erosion on the island. A submarine canyon called the Kapiti Seavalley runs parallel to the island, approximately seven kilometres to the west. On the north of the island is a freshwater lake called Ōkupe Lagoon. There are several streams which travel eastwards. The highest point on the island is named Tūteremoana, which is 521 metres (1,709 ft) above sea level.

Most of the island in owned by the Crown, with a small part owned by Māori. The islets surrounding Kapiti are also Māori-owned.

== Heritage sites ==
Kapiti Island has several sites recognised by Heritage New Zealand.

One such building is named 'The Whare', which is located around the centre of the island. It is the oldest building on Kapiti Island and is New Zealand's oldest building associated with conservation. The construction date of this building is not known, but evidence suggests that it was built in 1880 or earlier. The building was used to accommodate people involved with the farming of sheep on the island at the time. After the island became a nature reserve, the Whare housed caretakers and conservationists, including Richard Henry. After a building specially made for caretakers was constructed in the early 20th century, the Whare was used to house guests of the island instead.

Another heritage site is Te Kahuoterangi Whaling Station, a whaling station built between the 1830s and 1840s. It is about a kilometre south of Waiorua Bay and is under coastal forest and dense scrub. It is not known when operation of the station started, but evidence suggests that the station was in operation in 1839 and ended in 1843. In 1843 it was the station of multiple boats. The remains of the station are considered to be some of the most intact shore stations in New Zealand. In 1910, twenty stone hearths had been found.

== Tourism ==
Kapiti Island is a predator-free nature reserve and access is restricted. Visitors must have a permit to land on the island, and this is usually arranged via tourism operators. Access to Rangatira, a location half-way along the eastern shore is limited to a maximum of 100 visitors per day, and access to the north end is limited to 60 visitors per day. Visitors are not allowed to stay overnight in the area around Rangatira managed by the Department of Conservation. However, there is a private lodge at Waioura Bay on the north end of the island, operated by Kapiti Island Nature Tours where visitors can stay overnight.

Walking tracks for visitors landing at the Rangatira area include the Rangatira Loop Track which is 1.8 km (1.1 mi) and takes approximately 90 minutes. This is a loop and goes through regenerating forest, coastal shrubland, and the Rangatira wetland via a boardwalk. This track allows visitors to see trypots previously used for rendering whale blubber, and the historic Whare. The Wilkinson Track is 3.8 km (2.4 mi) one way, and takes approximately 2 hours to complete. It passes through a picnic area and a feeding station for hihi on the route to the summit of the island. The Trig Track is 2 km (1.2 mi) one way, and ascends to near the summit, taking approximately 2 hours to complete. The Okupe Valley Loop Track is 4.8 km (3.0 mi) and takes approximately 90 minutes, going to cliffs on the west of Kapiti Island. The Boulder Bank Loop Track is 2 km (1.2 mi) and takes approximately 45 minutes, following the coastline around the boulder bank. It is closed between October and March to prevent people disturbing nesting birds.

== Film and television ==
A film for television Island of Spirits, was made by Alistair Te Ariki Campbell in 1973, exploring the history of the island from the time of it being a base for Māori chief Te Rauparaha, to being the site of whaling stations and then its transition to a bird sanctuary. The 2005 film King Kong was filmed partly on Kapiti Island. The island was used as a filming location alongside other parts of the Kāpiti Coast in a film called Poppy (2021), about a girl with Down syndrome.

== Gallery ==
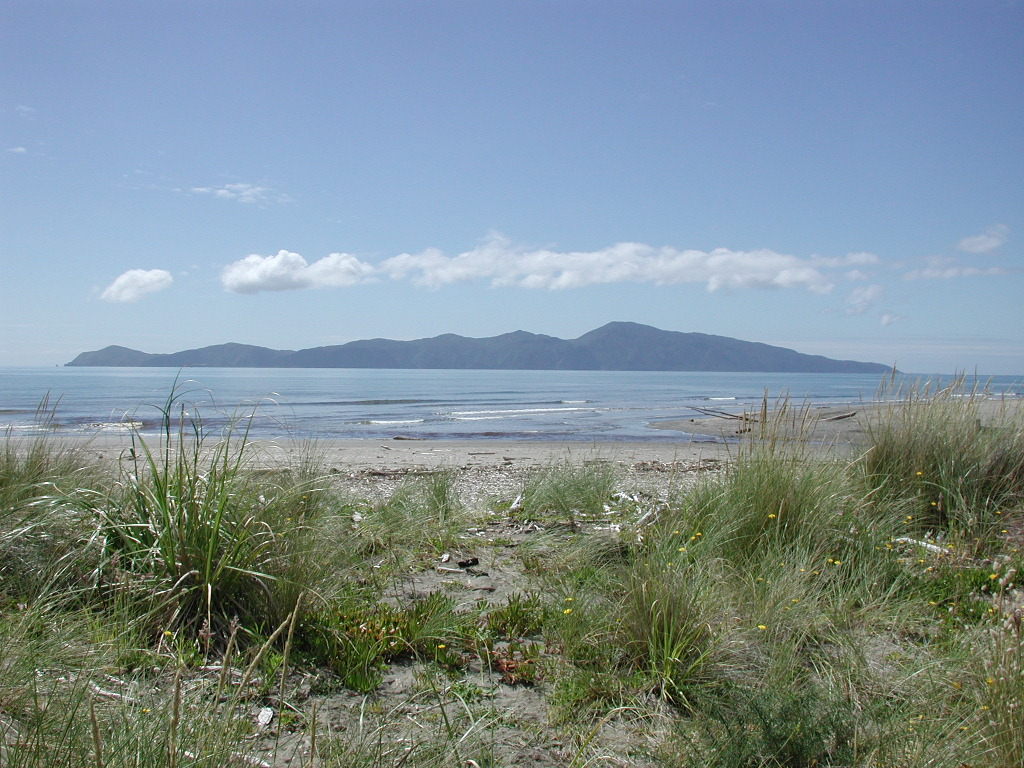
Kapiti Island from Queen Elizabeth Park

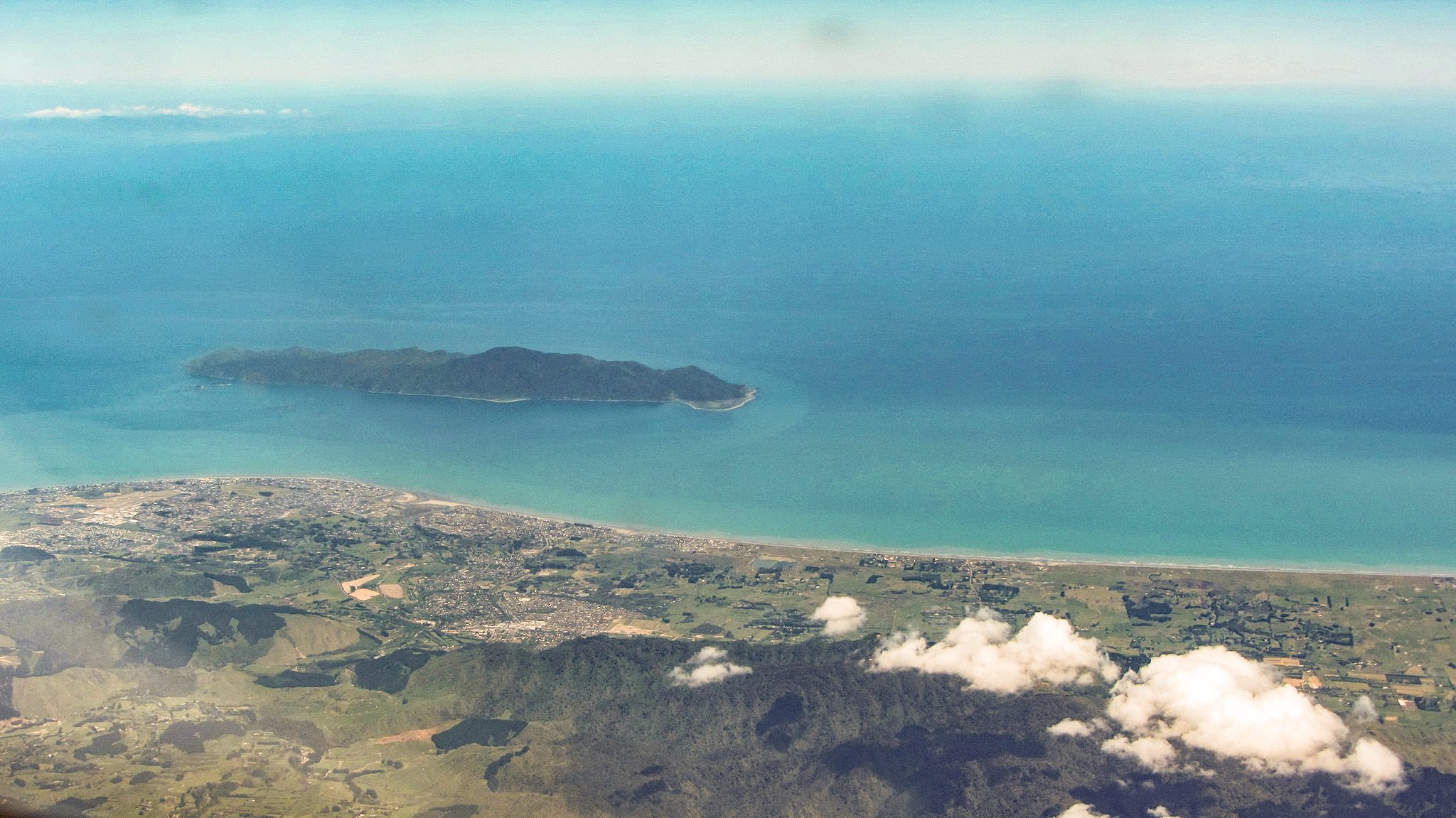
Aerial view of Kapiti Island

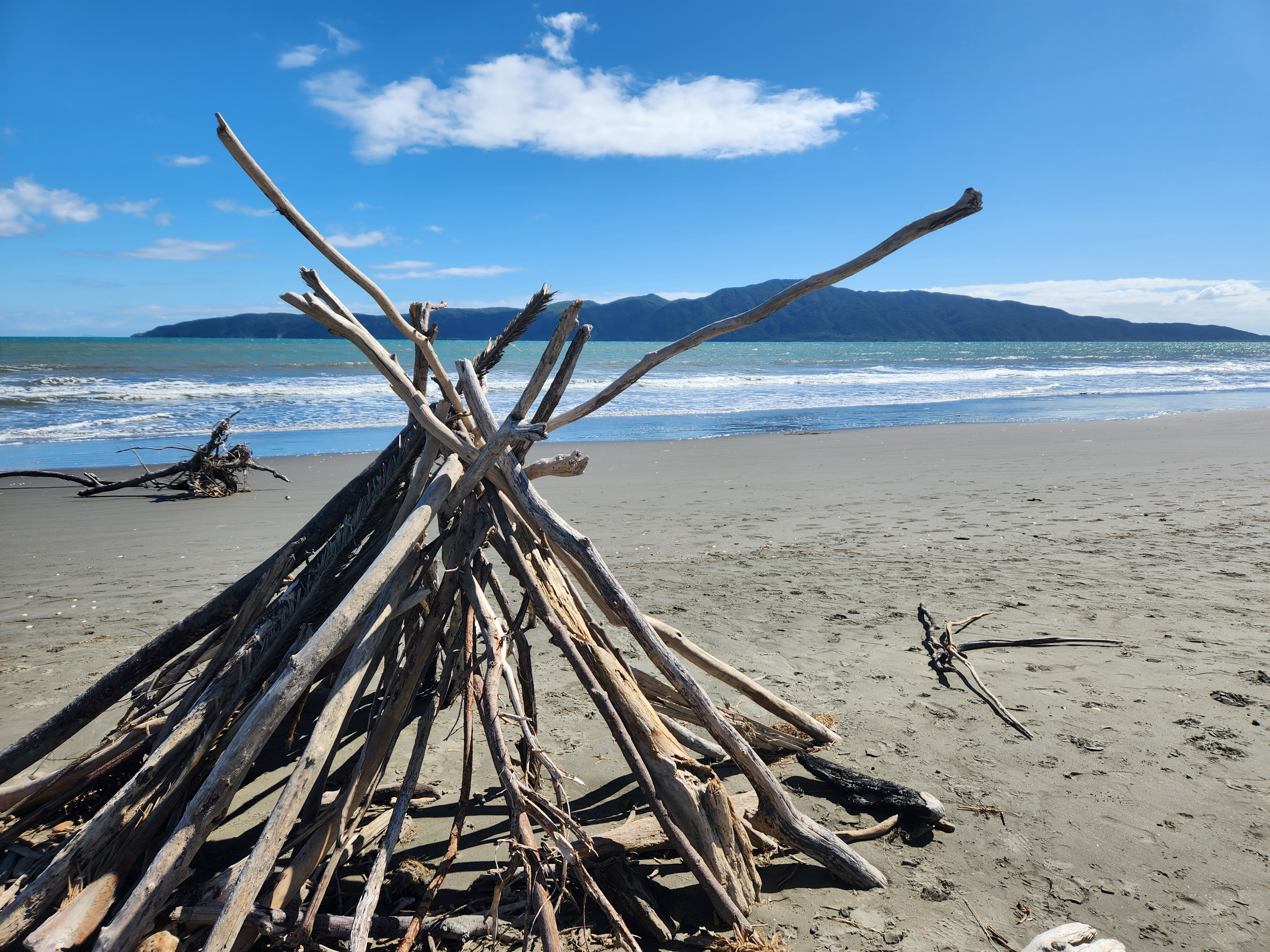
Driftwood fort with Kapiti Island in the background

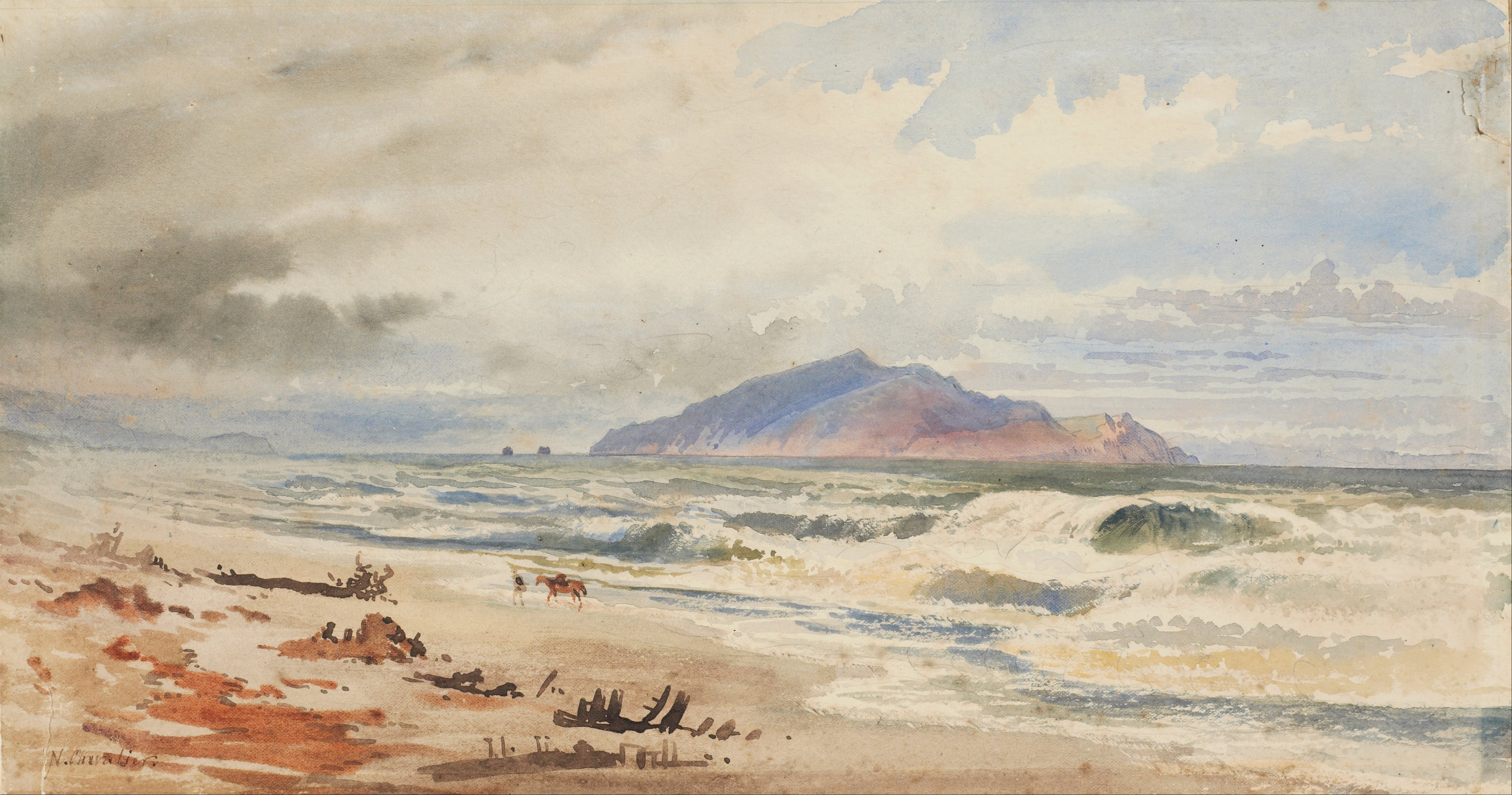
Kapiti (c. 1868), watercolour by Nicholas Chevalier

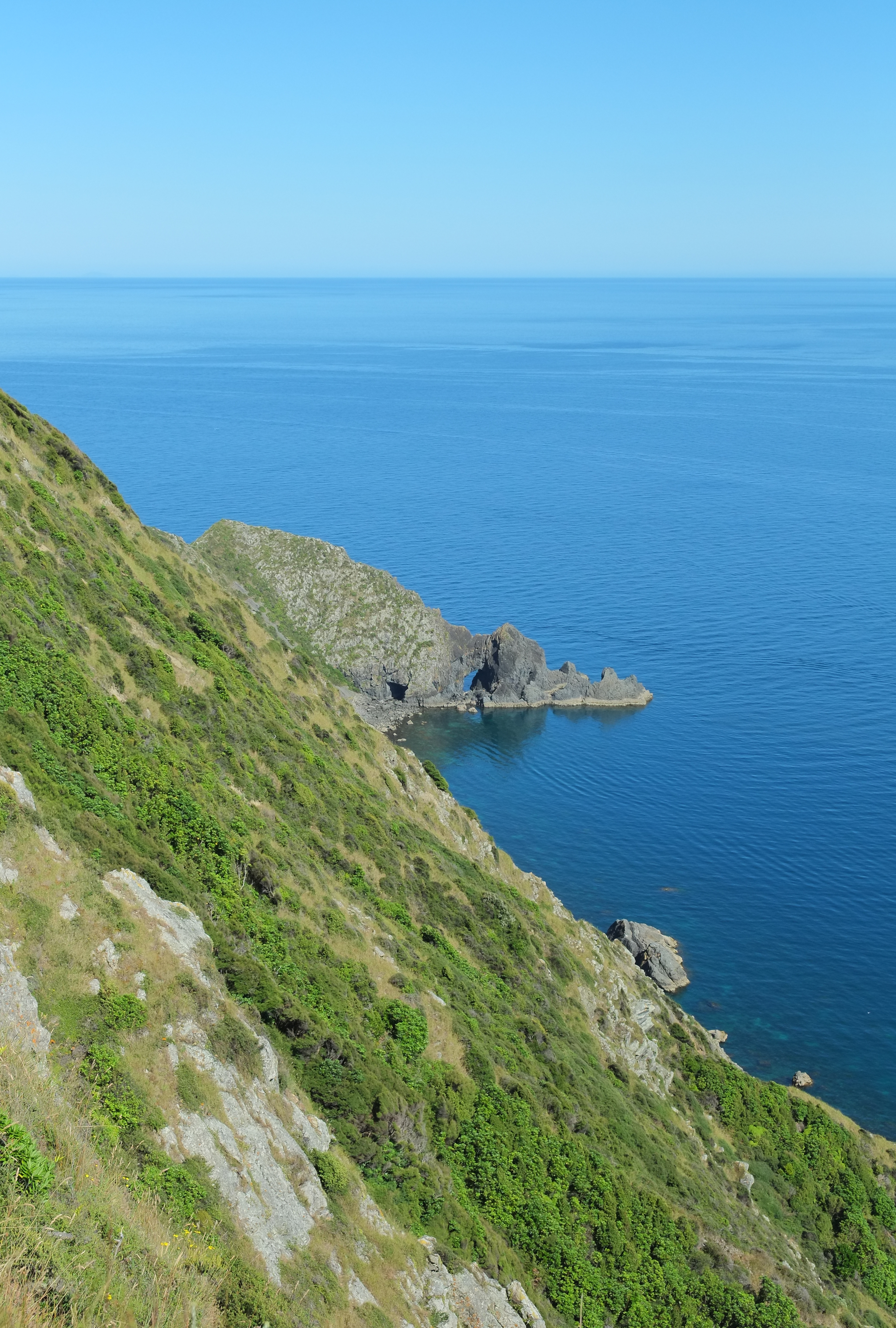
View of Arapawaiti Point and the steep cliffs on the north side of the island

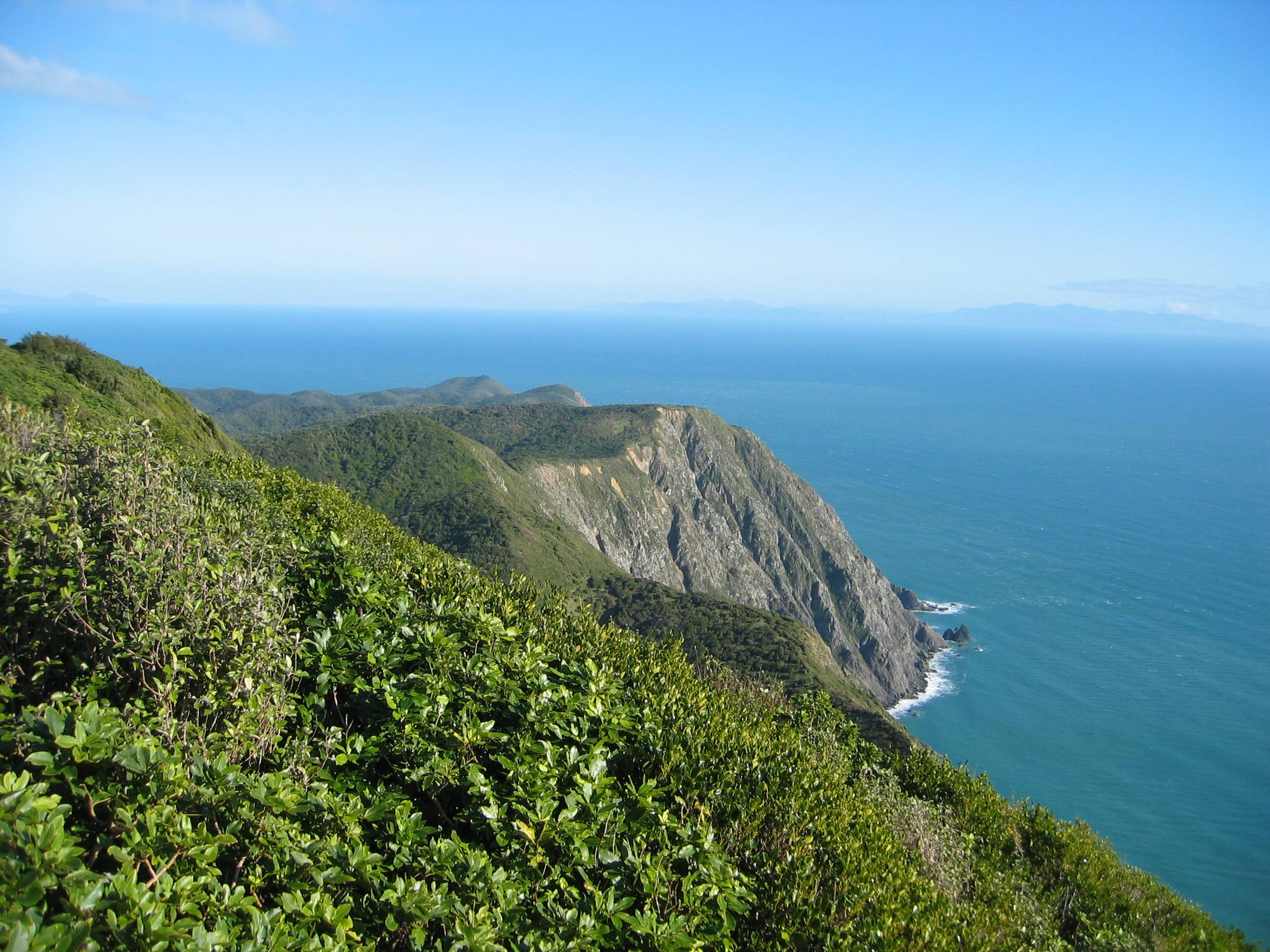
View from Tūteremoana, looking south along the steep cliffs towards Kaiwharawhara Point

== See also ==
- List of islands of New Zealand
