= Tokomāpuna Island / Aeroplane Island =

Island in New Zealand

- Interactive map of Tokomāpuna Island / Aeroplane Island

Geography
- Coordinates: 40.8803°S 174.9270°E

Administration
- New Zealand

Demographics
- Population: 0

Tokomāpuna Island / Aeroplane Island, also known as Evan's Island or Hummock Island, is an uninhabited islet located off the west coast of the lower North Island of New Zealand and off the east coast of Kapiti Island, in the Rauoterangi Channel.

== Geography ==
Tokomāpuna Island / Aeroplane Island is largely intact with limited modification present, with it having a very high level of natural character. Submerged rocky reefs result in the island having considerable submerged platforms. The platform surrounding the island encompasses the shoals of Passage Rocks, in the north-west, and the islets of White Rocks, in the south-east. The island is part of the Rakaia terrane, and is surrounded by strong currents.

== Ecology ==
Tokomāpuna Island / Aeroplane Island is an ecosite, and vegetation is mainly native, with exceptions regarding occasional species, such as boneseed and non-natural karo. Spearfishing is prohibited in Tokomāpuna Island / Aeroplane Island's vicinity.

== History ==
Tokomāpuna Island / Aeroplane Island was occupied by Māori before the arrival of Europeans. A small group of Ngāti Koata lived there in the 1830s and Te Rauparaha had stayed there from time to time. At one point, the island was owned and occupied by Ngāti Toa chief Tūngia. In October 1837, the HMS Conway visited Tokomāpuna Island / Aeroplane Island. Notes from Captain R.D. Bethune recorded the island as Hummock Island. Between the 1830s and 1840s, Thomas Evans operated a shore whaling station.

Many Ngāti Toa moved back to the mainland after the signing of the Treaty of Waitangi in 1840. Thomas Evans moved to Long Point, Kapiti Island, in 1841, so it was likely that 1840 was the last year of operation for the whaling station. Today, archaeological remnants associated with the station remain on the island. In 1934, a cannon, a broken trypot, and a few whalebones were reported on the island, and in 1982, these remnants included a trypot stand, a number of stone hearths, as well as a grave on the southern end of the island.

In 2017, a radio tower, complete with a transmitter, was erected on the island. It was built to track the triggering of individual predator traps. The tower also contains a webcam, used to dissuade poaching and to track sea conditions for local kayakers. The project was initiated and funded by the Kapiti Coast Biodiversity Project, which, in turn, was funded by the Ministry for the Environment.
