= Manawahe =

Rural settlement in Bay of Plenty Region, New Zealand

- Locality
- Interactive map of Manawahe
- Coordinates: 37.999°S 176.643°E
- Country: New Zealand
- Region: Bay of Plenty
- Territorial authority: Whakatāne District
- Ward: Rangitāiki General Ward
- Community: Rangitāiki Community
- Electorates: East Cape; Waiariki (Māori)

Government
  - Territorial authority: Whakatāne District Council
  - Regional council: Bay of Plenty Regional Council
  - Mayor of Whakatāne: Nándor Tánczos
  - East Cape MP: Dana Kirkpatrick
  - Waiariki MP: Rawiri Waititi

Area
  - Total: 267.00 km^{2} (103.09 sq mi)

Population (June 2025)
  - Total: 1,240
  - Density: 4.64/km^{2} (12.0/sq mi)
- Postcode(s): 3073

Manawahe is a rural area south of Matatā within the Whakatāne District and Bay of Plenty region of New Zealand's North Island. It is based in hills to the west of the Rangitaiki plain.

== Demographics ==
Manawahe statistical area covers 267.00 km^{2} (103.09 sq mi) and had an estimated population of 1,240 as of June 2025, with a population density of 4.6 people per km^{2}.

Historical population
Year	Pop.	±% p.a.
2006	822	—
2013	888	+1.11%
2018	996	+2.32%
2023	1,209	+3.95%

Manawahe had a population of 1,209 in the 2023 New Zealand census, an increase of 213 people (21.4%) since the 2018 census, and an increase of 321 people (36.1%) since the 2013 census. There were 618 males and 594 females in 477 dwellings. 2.0% of people identified as LGBTIQ+. The median age was 48.4 years (compared with 38.1 years nationally). There were 213 people (17.6%) aged under 15 years, 144 (11.9%) aged 15 to 29, 612 (50.6%) aged 30 to 64, and 243 (20.1%) aged 65 or older.

People could identify as more than one ethnicity. The results were 83.6% European (Pākehā); 25.3% Māori; 1.7% Pasifika; 2.0% Asian; 0.2% Middle Eastern, Latin American and African New Zealanders (MELAA); and 5.0% other, which includes people giving their ethnicity as "New Zealander". English was spoken by 97.5%, Māori by 5.7%, and other languages by 5.0%. No language could be spoken by 1.7% (e.g. too young to talk). New Zealand Sign Language was known by 0.2%. The percentage of people born overseas was 12.7, compared with 28.8% nationally.

Religious affiliations were 24.1% Christian, 1.0% Hindu, 0.2% Islam, 1.7% Māori religious beliefs, 0.2% Buddhist, 1.0% New Age, and 0.5% other religions. People who answered that they had no religion were 64.8%, and 7.2% of people did not answer the census question.

Of those at least 15 years old, 186 (18.7%) people had a bachelor's or higher degree, 588 (59.0%) had a post-high school certificate or diploma, and 219 (22.0%) people exclusively held high school qualifications. The median income was $41,700, compared with $41,500 nationally. 129 people (13.0%) earned over $100,000 compared to 12.1% nationally. The employment status of those at least 15 was 495 (49.7%) full-time, 180 (18.1%) part-time, and 30 (3.0%) unemployed.

== Education ==
Manawahe School was operating by 1912 but closed in 2010 due to a falling roll and problems with governance. The school building became a base for the Manawahe Kokako Trust.
