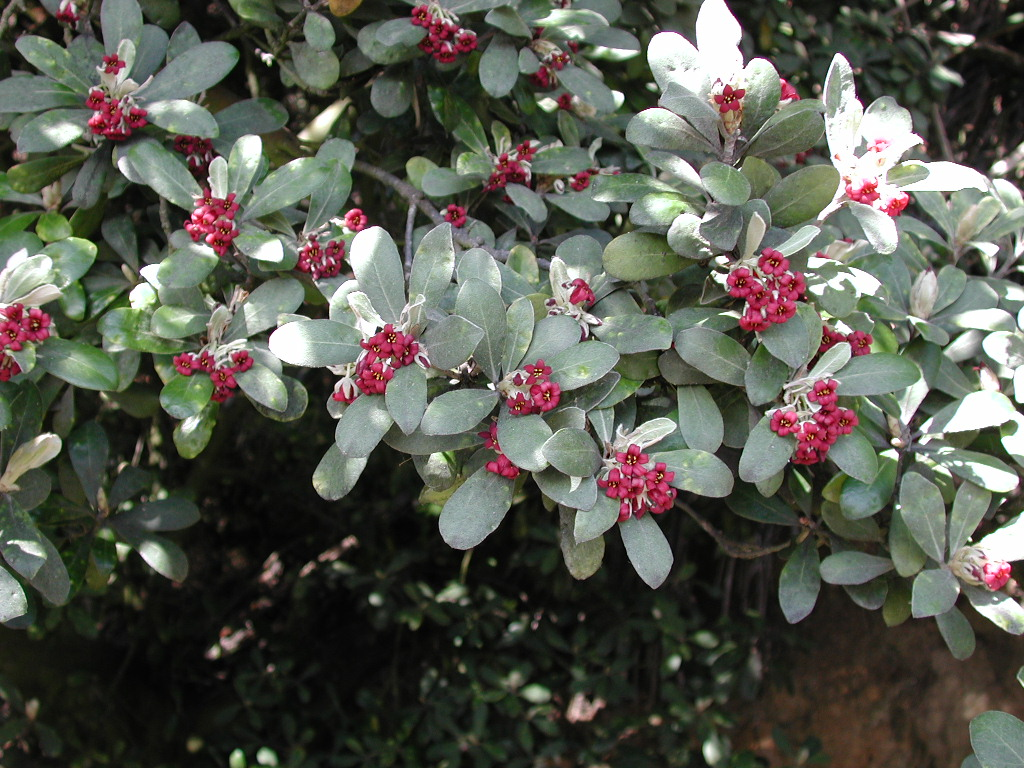

Conservation status
- Not Threatened (NZ TCS)

Scientific classification
- Kingdom: Plantae
- Clade: Tracheophytes
- Clade: Angiosperms
- Clade: Eudicots
- Clade: Asterids
- Order: Apiales
- Family: Pittosporaceae
- Genus: Pittosporum
- Species: P. crassifolium

Binomial name
- Pittosporum crassifolium Banks & Sol. ex A.Cunn.

= Pittosporum crassifolium =

Species of tree endemic to New Zealand

Pittosporum crassifolium, karo, stiffleaf cheesewood, kaikaro or kihiki is a relatively fast-growing large shrub or small tree with an erect, fastigiate growth habit. It is endemic to New Zealand.

This species is self-supporting with a simple form that can grow up to 10 m tall. Pittosporum crassifolium is part of the wider Pittosporaceae family, which has over 160 species in the southern hemisphere.

== Description ==
The leaves on this species are approximately 5-10x2-3cm and are oval shaped, dark green and leathery with grey tomentum (fine hairs) on the undersides of the leaves including the petioles and inflorescences. This tomentum provides protection against coastal winds by preventing salt damage and moisture loss.

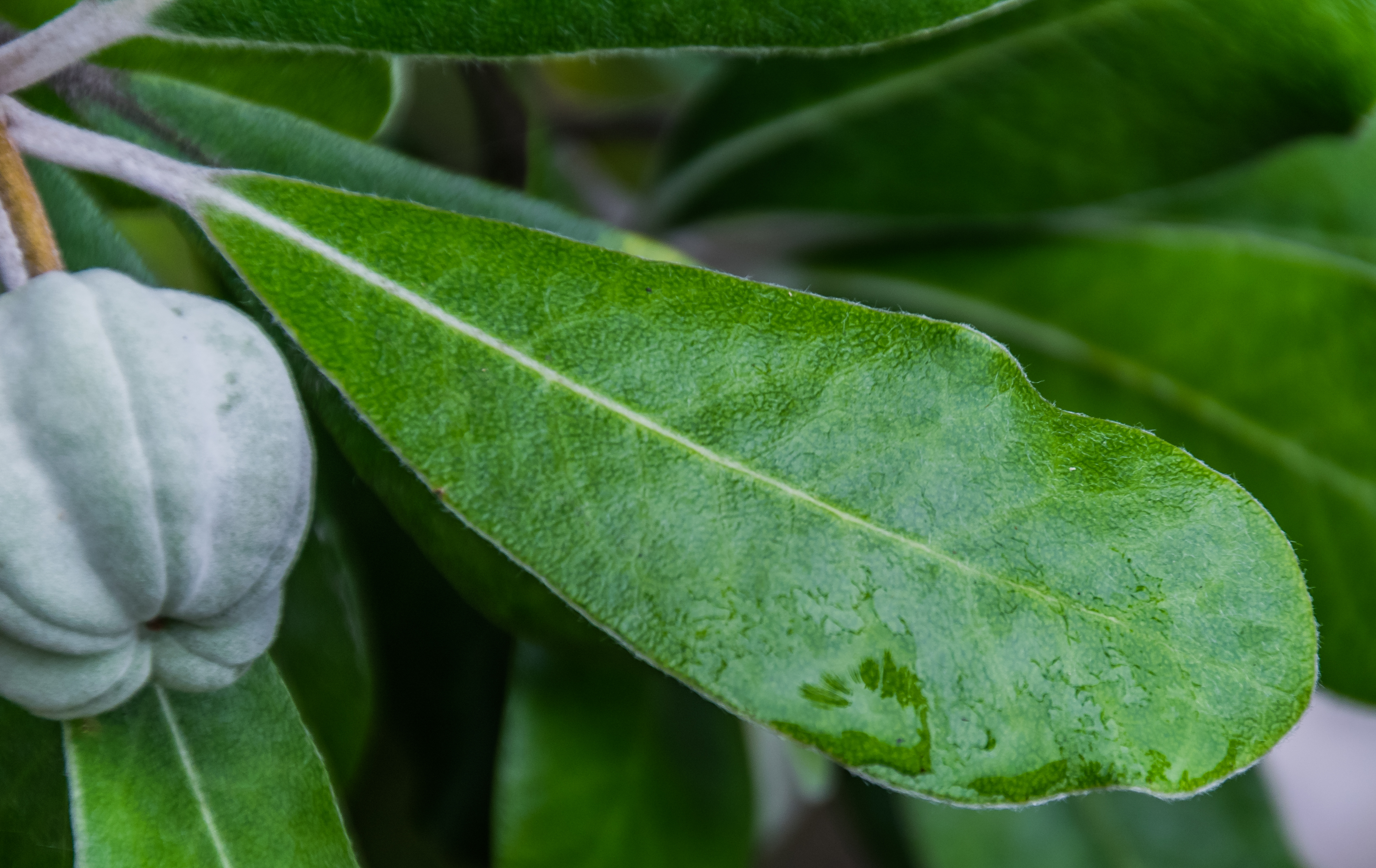
Leaf shape and green capsules of Pittosporum crassifolium

The leaves are simple and are alternately arranged and are very dense at the furthest point away from the stem. The leaf margins are recurved, thick and leathery (hence the name crassifolium which translates from Latin to "thick leaf") and they often show signs of insect damage. The apex of the leaf can vary from being obtuse (blunt and rounded) to acute (sharp and tapered) The petioles are the stalk between the leaf and the stem, and they measure approximately 4-14x1-3mm.

When in ideal growing conditions, karo can grow into small trees (up to 5 metres (16 ft)) with multiple trunks. The bark on karo is dark brown and black and has distinct lenticels which allow for breathing. Juvenile plants often appear different from the adult form as the branchlets are covered with tomentum until they mature and become darker.

During the spring to early summer, karo produce fragrant burgundy red flowers that are around 10cm long with long stalks and are borne in terminal umbels meaning that they grow in clusters, similar to the shape of an umbrella. These terminals are also hairy, unlike the flowers which gives this plant extra protection from salt spray. The flowers of the karo are unisexual, meaning each terminal produces between 5-10 male flowers and up to 5 female flowers. A distinct feature of the karo flowers is the fragrance which “pervades the evening air”. The sepals of the flower (the green part below the flower bud) measure approximately 7-11mm x 1.5-3mm and they have small cilia (hairs) and brown tomentose along the margin.

After the karo has flowered, it produces green capsules, that then develop into woody seed pods with black seeds that are sticky and shiny and are protected inside a trigonous capsule (three angled) which measures approximately 25mm x25mm and is filled with black glutinous matter.

Although endemic to the upper North Island of New Zealand, this species has now spread both nationally and internationally and is now considered a weed in areas where it is non-endemic.

The main way of distinguishing Pittosporum crassifolium from other native New Zealand pittosporums such as Pittosporum tenuifolium and Pittosporum eugenioides is the distinct grey tomentum on the underside of the leaves which differs from these other species. The leaves of Pittosporum crassifolium also have less undulation than these other species.

== Range ==
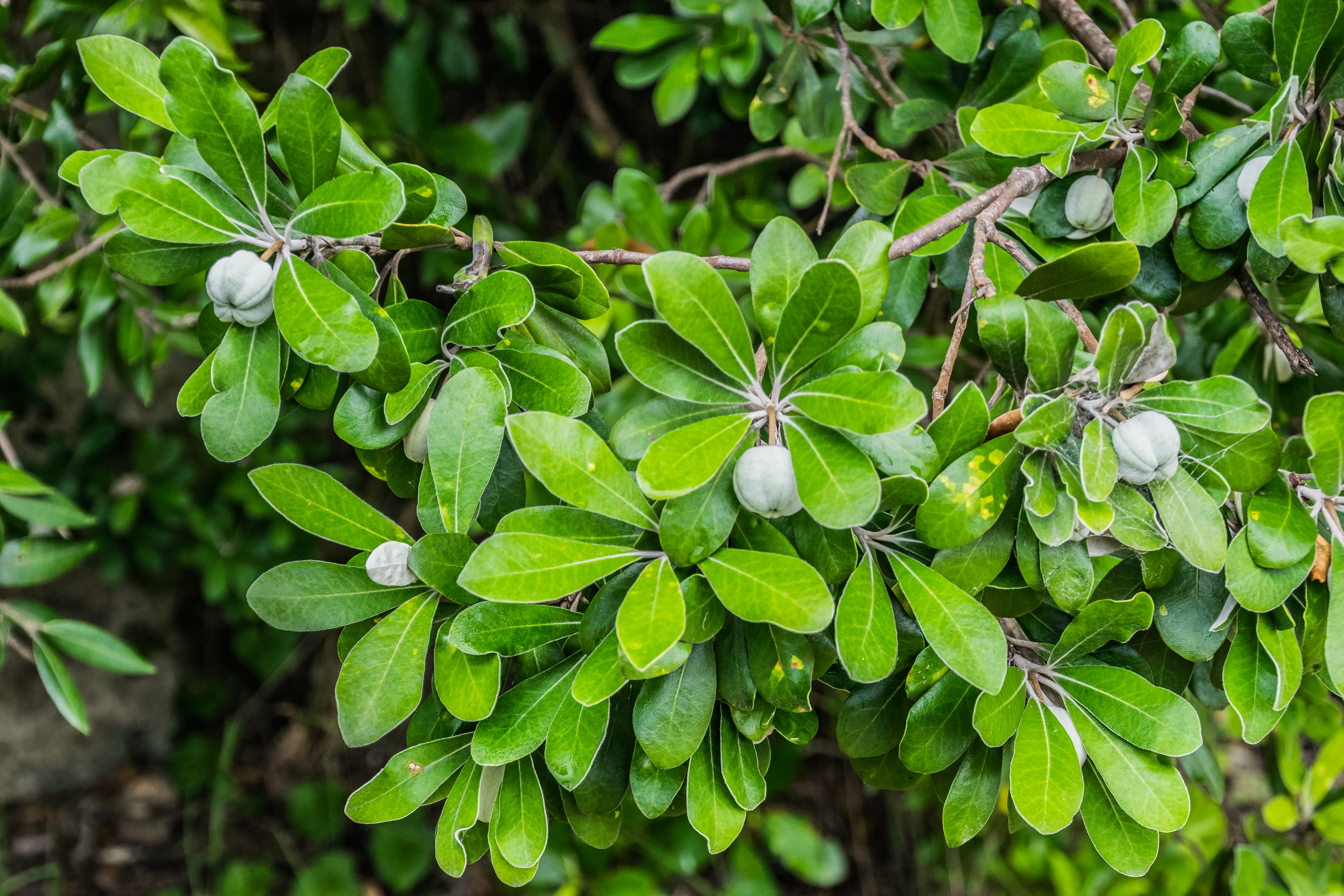
Pittosporum crassifolium, Coromandel Peninsula, New Zealand

Karo's original distribution was generally the top half of the North Island, although now it has naturalised throughout New Zealand and overseas in Norfolk Island, Hawaii and the Isles of Scilly. This species has been recorded on iNaturalist in many other countries. The Integrated Taxonomic Information System has compiled a list of these countries which includes South Africa, Portugal, England and America. These areas where it has been found are all coastal, which has allowed this species to handle the conditions due to the natural adaptations it has.

Karo is endemic to the north part of the North Island and is found from North Cape to Poverty Bay and in the Kermadec and Chatham Islands. This species has naturally spread through bird dispersal throughout New Zealand and is now a reasonably common species in the South Island, Chatham and Stewart Islands. Because this species wasn’t endemic to the South Island it is now considered an urban weed. It has been widely dispersed by exotic and indigenous birds.

== Habitat ==
Karo can be found in a variety of habitats including forest margins, cliff faces, streamside and rocky areas. The tomentum on the leaf undersides allow for this species to thrive in coastal conditions because the fine hairs help reduce salt damage and prevent moisture loss. Because karo are mainly found in coastal areas and near the sea, they have been referred to as the most tolerant species of New Zealand's tree pittosporums of coastal conditions.

== Ecology ==
=== Life cycle and phenology ===
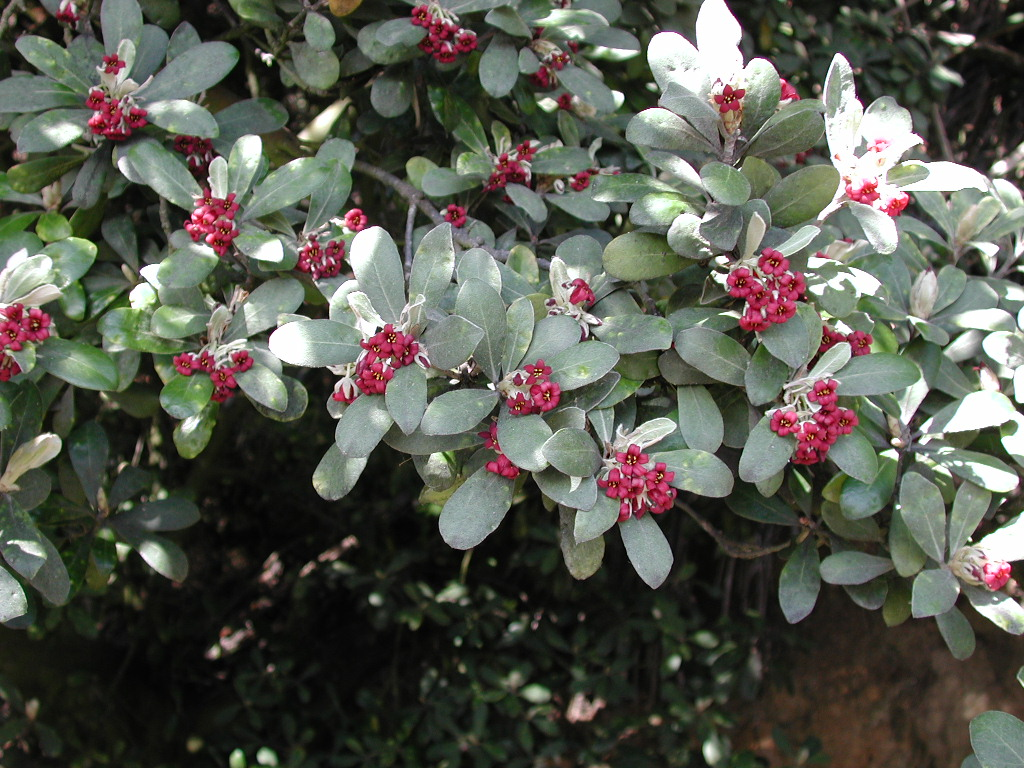
Foliage and flowers of Pittosporum crassifolium during the flowering period

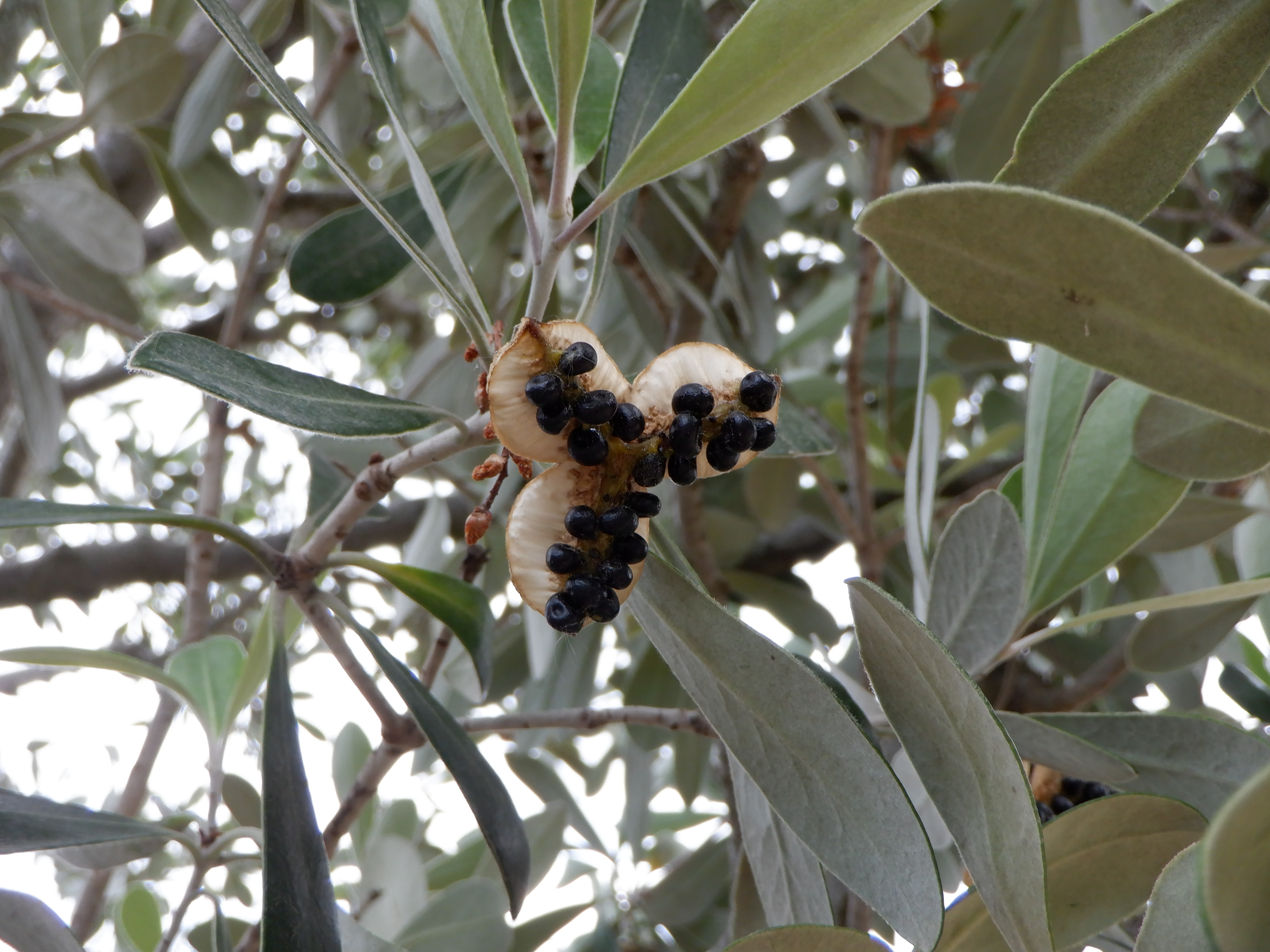
Seeds inside the split capsule of the Pittosporum crassifolium

The karo produces dark red flowers with a fragrant smell from August to October. Towards the end of the flowering period, this species produces green capsules which develop into seedpods with black seeds within. In September, when the fruit is ripe, the capsule splits into three or four valves which have an orange colouring on the inside.

These fruits are then consumed by many different species including rats and possums. The ripe seed is on the shrub for approximately six months and ripens in winter which allows plenty of time for dispersal via birds and other animals. During spring, this species produces pale green leaves with white tomentum, which creates contrast against the old foliage with the dark leaves and red flowers.

=== Growth habit ===
Karo prefer to be planted in dry and free draining soil. This species is happy in sun or shade; however, the height of this species will depend on its exposure to sunlight. When planted in shade karo will stretch to try and find light; however, in a full sun position it tends to have a compacted habit. When in sun, this species can grow up to 3m tall; meaning in a more sheltered environment it can grow up to 6m tall. Although this species isn’t fussy about the soil type, if a karo is in waterlogged soil it can lose its leaves and it will become weakened. Karo are also frost sensitive whilst juvenile; however, they are able to tolerate frost and snowfalls once mature. In order for this species to thrive and have optimal plant growth and health, it should be pruned back to the leaf node at least once a year.

=== Predators, parasites and diseases ===
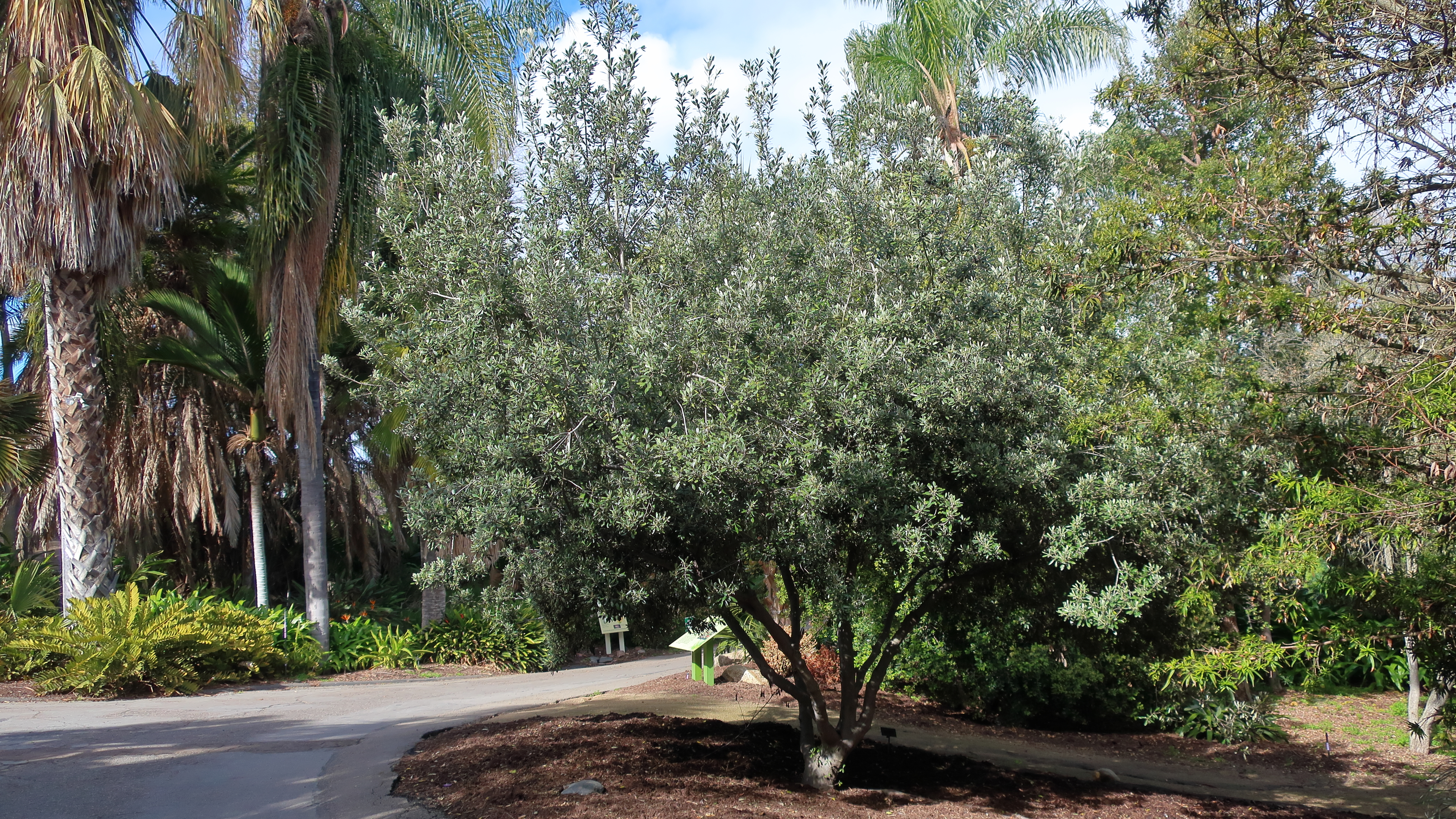
Pittosporum crassifolium planted as a specimen tree in the New Zealand garden at the San Diego Botanic Gardens

Karo is a tolerant plant that is mainly pest free. It can be susceptible to psyllids, but this only causes aesthetic damage to the plant. However, karo does attract many animals and insects that eat the leaves and fruits. The ITIS has found that some of the main predators are; tūī (Prosthemadera novaeseelandiae), silvereye (Zosterops lateralis), western honey bee (Apis mellifera), common brushtail possum (Trichosurus vulpecula), black tailed bumblebee (Bombus melanopygus) and the New Zealand bellbird (Anthornis melanura). A study has also been conducted into a new parasite found on Pittosporum crassifolium. This parasite was identified as Zeatylenchus pittosporum and it was identified on the species due to the distinct yellow and brown discolouration on the leaves of the karo.

== Additional information ==
Although karo can be considered a pest, this species can be planted as a specimen tree and is also useful planted as a hedge or as a windbreak.

Karo are often mistaken for a feijoa when they are juvenile. This is because they have a very similar form when they are first putting out new growth as the plant appears almost completely grey.

Pittosporum crassifolium is considered to be a "weed in cultivation" in California, where this species is being kept under observation to ensure it does not become invasive.

A study in 2021 tested Pittosporum crassifolium for antimicrobial potential and it was found that it can be used as a traditional remedy.
