= List of historic places in the Kāpiti Coast District =

The following list of historic places in the Kāpiti Coast District contains buildings, structures and areas within the district that are listed by Heritage New Zealand.

The Kāpiti Coast District is a territorial authority of New Zealand located in the lower North Island in the northwestern Wellington Region. The population is concentrated in a chain of settlements along the coast stretching from Paekākāriki in the south to Ōtaki in the north, while the district also includes Kapiti Island. The region was first inhabited by Māori, including the iwi of Muaūpoko, while Ngāti Raukawa and Ngāti Toa later moved into the area in the mid nineteenth century. In the same period, Pākehā (European) settlers began to arrive in the region, including some of the earliest settlers as whalers on Kapiti Island and Christian missionaries in Ōtaki. The region's earliest surviving structures date from this period, while others date from the region's time as a significant link in the North Island Main Trunk railway line or as a base for United States Marine Corps forces in the Second World War.

Heritage New Zealand classification of sites on the New Zealand Heritage List / Rārangi Kōrero, in accordance with the Heritage New Zealand Pouhere Taonga Act 2014, distinguishes between Category 1 ("places of special or outstanding historical or cultural significance") and Category 2 ("places of historic or cultural significance"). Sites containing a number of related significant places are listed as Historic Areas. Additionally, sites important to Māori communities are given special classifications, including wāhi tapu for sites of spiritual, traditional, or ritual importance. Thirty-nine places located within the Kāpiti Coast District are included on the New Zealand Heritage List, including nine category 1 historic places, twenty-four category 2 historic places, one historic area, two wāhi tapu and two wāhi tapu areas. One further site, Ngatiawa Bridge in Waikanae, was formerly a Category 2 historic place but collapsed in 2017.

== List of historic places ==
Historic places in Kāpiti Coast District
Name	Classification	Location	Constructed	Registered	List #	Image and notes
Field Hut	Category 1	Tararua: Tararua Forest Park	1924	2024	9821	New Zealand's earliest-surviving purpose-built public use tramping hut.
Ōtaki Children’s Health Camp (Former)	Category 1	Ōtaki: 29 Health Camp Rd	1932	2020	4098	New Zealand's first permanent children's health camp.
Paekakariki Railway Yard Water Vats	Category 1	Paekākāriki: 219 State Highway 59	1901	1986	4705	Rare remaining examples of the railway water vats from the steam locomotive era. Relocated to Paekākāriki in 1975. Part of the Paekākāriki Railway Station Historic Area.
Scottish Kirk	Category 1	Reikorangi: 5 Akatarawa Road	1862	1998	7422	Presbyterian Church that was also constructed to be used as a defensive blockhouse during the New Zealand Wars.
South End Signal Box	Category 1	Paekākāriki: Paekakariki railway station, North Island Main Trunk/State Highway 59	1909	1986	4706	Rare remaining example of signal box in New Zealand, remained in use until 1985 and was restored in 2007. Part of the Paekākāriki Railway Station Historic Area.
St Mary's Church (Catholic)	Category 1	Ōtaki: Convent Road	1859	1986	4701	New Zealand's oldest Catholic church still in use.
Te Kahuoterangi Whaling Station	Category 1	Kapiti Island	1839	2006	7662	One of the most intact remains of shore whaling stations in New Zealand. Known to have operated from at least 1839.
Te Rauparaha Memorial and Jubilee Monument	Category 1	Ōtaki: Te Rauparaha St and Hadfield St	1880	1989	4103	A memorial to Te Rauparaha and a monument commemorating 40 years since the arrival of Christianity in Ōtaki, both erected in 1880. The original wooden Jubilee Monument was replaced with the present concrete obelisk in 1927.
World War Two Fuel Tank Blast Wall	Category 1	Paekākāriki: Te Puka Stream, State Highway 59	1942	2023	9869	Blast wall constructed by the Public Works Department during the Second World War, intended to house an aviation fuel depot for the United States Marine Corps which was ultimately never constructed.
Arapawaiti	Category 2	Paraparaumu Beach: 10 Hana Udy Place	1840	1985	4967	Oldest surviving building in Kāpiti region, one of few surviving ferry inns in New Zealand.
Cottage	Category 2	Ōtaki: State Highway 1		1985	4093	"The cottage with café signage"
Kildoon House	Category 2	Waikanae: 48 Winara Ave	1912	1985	4104	Home built for Hemi and Huria Matenga, who gained national prominence after saving the crew and passengers of a founded ship.
Kildoon Stables	Category 2	Waikanae: 48 Winara Ave	1912	1985	4105	Stables built for Hemi and Huria Matenga, who gained national prominence after saving the crew and passengers of a founded ship.
Mirek Smíšek Beehive Kilns	Category 2	Te Horo: 990 State Highway 1	1970	2023	9722	Two pottery kilns constructed and used by potter Mirek Smíšek.
Otaki BNZ (Former)	Category 2	Ōtaki: 49 Main St	1918	2004	7534	Former Bank of New Zealand branch office and Kāpiti Coast District Council office, currently home to the Ōtaki Museum. One of the oldest surviving buildings in Ōtaki and one of few surviving small town bank buildings.
Paekākāriki Railway Station	Category 2	Paekākāriki: North Island Main Trunk/State Highway 59	1909	1985	4959	One of the oldest extant island railway stations in New Zealand. Part of the Paekākāriki Railway Station Historic Areas.
Paraparaumu Airport Control Tower (Former)	Category 2	Paraparaumu: 227 Kapiti Rd	1947	2003	7532	Former air traffic control tower for Paraparaumu Airport, constructed when this was the main airport for Wellington City.
Lovat House	Category 2	Te Horo: Hadfield Rd		1985	4095	
Māori School (next to Rangiātea Church)	Category 2	Ōtaki: Te Rauparaha St		1985	4968	"The school entrance"
Māori University Building (Formerly Māori College Hostel)	Category 2	Ōtaki: Tasman Rd	1909	1985	4096	Hostel for Māori College that operated in Ōtaki from 1853–1939. Part of Te Wananga o Raukawa from 1981.
Ōtaki Railway Station	Category 2	Ōtaki: Arthur Street	1911	1985	4099	One of the diminishing number of railway stations following George Troup's Type B design.
Pits	Category 2	Paekākāriki		1986	6139	Archaeological remains of Māori pits.
Pits	Category 2	Paekākāriki		1986	6140	Archaeological remains of Māori pits.
Pukekaraka Presbytery	Category 2	Ōtaki: Convent Rd	1897	1985	4100	Catholic presbytery located near St Mary's Church.
Rahui Factory Social Hall	Category 2	Ōtaki: 35 Rahui Rd		1985	4101	
Rahui Milk Treatment Station	Category 2	Ōtaki: 35 Rahui Rd		1985	4102	
Railway House	Category 2	Ōtaki: 206 Mill Rd		1985	4955	
Railway House	Category 2	Ōtaki: 208 Mill Rd		1985	4956	
Raised-rim Pits	Category 2	Paekākāriki: Paekakariki Hill Road	1850?	1986	6138	Archaeological remains of a series of clusters of square and rectangular raised-rim pits, approximately 23 in total. Largest known collection of pits in the Wellington Region, well-preserved.
The Whare	Category 2	Kapiti Island	1880	1996	7342	Oldest surviving building on Kapiti Island and New Zealand's oldest building associated with nature conservation.
Union Parish Church (Former)	Category 2	Waikanae: 20-24 Reikorangi Rd		1983	939	Relocated from Manaia in Taranaki.
US Marines' Commissary Shed (Former)	Category 2	Paekākāriki: 219 State Highway 59	1942	1985	4961	Constructed for United States Marine Corps base in Paekākāriki during the Second World War. Later known as "Rail-Air Shed", served as a sorting depot for goods flown from Blenheim for distribution across Wellington Region.
Waikanae Post Office (Former)	Category 2	Waikanae: 9 Elizabeth St	1907	1993	7125	Representative of the nationwide expansion of postal services in early twentieth-century New Zealand. Now the Kāpiti Coast Museum.
Paekākāriki Railway Station and Yard Historic Area	Historic area	Paekākāriki: North Island Main Trunk/State Highway 59	1886	1985	7026	Includes South End Signal Box, Paekākāriki Railway Station and island platform, US Marines' Commissary Shed (Former), Paekākāriki Railway Yard Water Vats, and the station turntable.
Ruakōhatu Urupā	Wāhi tapu	Waikanae: 4 Pehi Kupa St		2013	7825	Urupā (burial ground) set aside for the descendants of Wi Parata.
Te Rua Tūpāpaku o Te Rangihiroa	Wāhi tapu	Kapiti Island		2017	9792	Grave in Waiorua Bay of Kapiti Island.
Takamore	Wāhi tapu area	Waikanae Beach: Flaxmere St, Gates Rd, Weggery Dr, Waikanae River, Kauri Rd, & Puriri Rd		1995	7263	Contains a range of interrelated cultural, historical and archaeological sites.
Te Pou o Tainui	Wāhi tapu area	Ōtaki: Convent Rd		2000	7506	Includes hauhau flagpole and totara tree planted by King Tāwhiao.
Ngatiawa Bridge	Former Category 2 historic place	Reikorangi: Mangaone South Rd	1913		7189	Truss bridge with a 27m span. Used until a new bridge was built downstream circa 1980. Collapsed in 2017.
