= New Zealand dabchick =

Conservation status
- Least Concern (IUCN 3.1)

- Nationally Increasing (NZ TCS)

Scientific classification
- Kingdom: Animalia
- Phylum: Chordata
- Class: Aves
- Order: Podicipediformes
- Family: Podicipedidae
- Genus: Poliocephalus
- Species: P. rufopectus

Binomial name
- Poliocephalus rufopectus (Gray, 1843)

Species of bird

The New Zealand dabchick (Poliocephalus rufopectus), also known as the New Zealand grebe or by its Māori name weweia, is a member of the grebe family endemic to New Zealand.

== Taxonomy ==
Poliocephalus rufopectus is an aquatic diving bird in the grebe order Podicipediformes.

Poliocephalus rufopectus was originally described by the English ornithologist George Robert Gray as Podiceps rufopectus G.R.Gray, 1843 (in the subgenus Poliocephalus). The type specimen was collected by British botanist and scientific collector Andrew Sinclair in New Zealand. P. rufopectus is one of two species in the genus Poliocephalus, the other being the hoary-headed grebe (Poliocephalus poliocephalus) which is native to Australia.

== Description ==
The New Zealand dabchick has dark brown plumage, a small black head with fine silver feathers, a black pointed bill and characteristic yellow eyes. It grows to about 29 cm (11 in), and weighs about 250 g (8.8 oz). Non-breeding individuals have a paler plumage and females tend to be a bit lighter, smaller and have a slightly shorter bill than males.

== Distribution and habitat ==
This grebe species inhabits mainly shallow freshwater lakes, ponds and sheltered inlets. Currently it is found mainly in the North Island, where it is well distributed on the coastal lakes of the western coast from North Cape to Pukekohe and from Taranaki to Paraparaumu, as well as on ponds at the Volcanic Plateau, Gisborne, Hawke's Bay and the Wairarapa. The species was also present in the lowland lakes of the South Island, but underwent a rapid decline, for unknown reasons, in the 19th century – the last regular breeding record in the South Island was in 1941. In 2012 a pair bred near Tākaka for the first time in recent history.

== Behaviour ==
These freshwater diving birds usually fly only at night. During the day they are always found in the water, swimming on the surface and frequently diving to feed. If they are in danger or are disturbed at daytime they do not flee by flying, but swim or dive away. During autumn and winter they form flocks, while during the breeding season they are mostly seen in monogamous pairs. They show aggressive territorial behaviour towards intruders and the otherwise silent species give short calls throughout the breeding season and when in danger.

== Diet ==
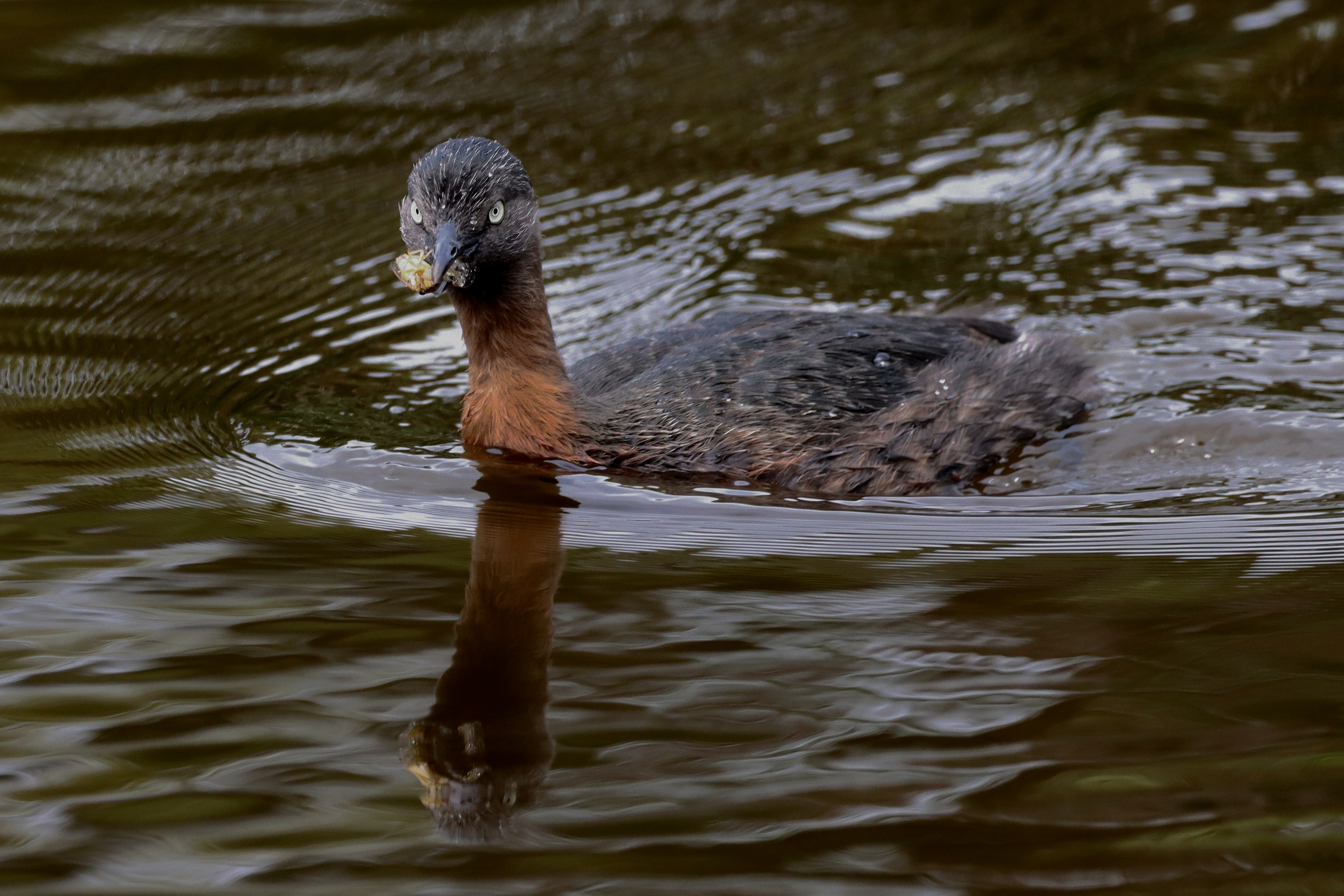
Adult dabchick with insect

Their diet consists mostly of aquatic insects and their larvae, as well as small molluscs such as freshwater snails. Bigger prey such as fish and freshwater crayfish are sometimes eaten too. Thus, their bill, being short and pointed, is adapted to their mainly invertebrate diet. They catch their prey during dives and feeding underwater or pick it from the water surface.

== Breeding ==
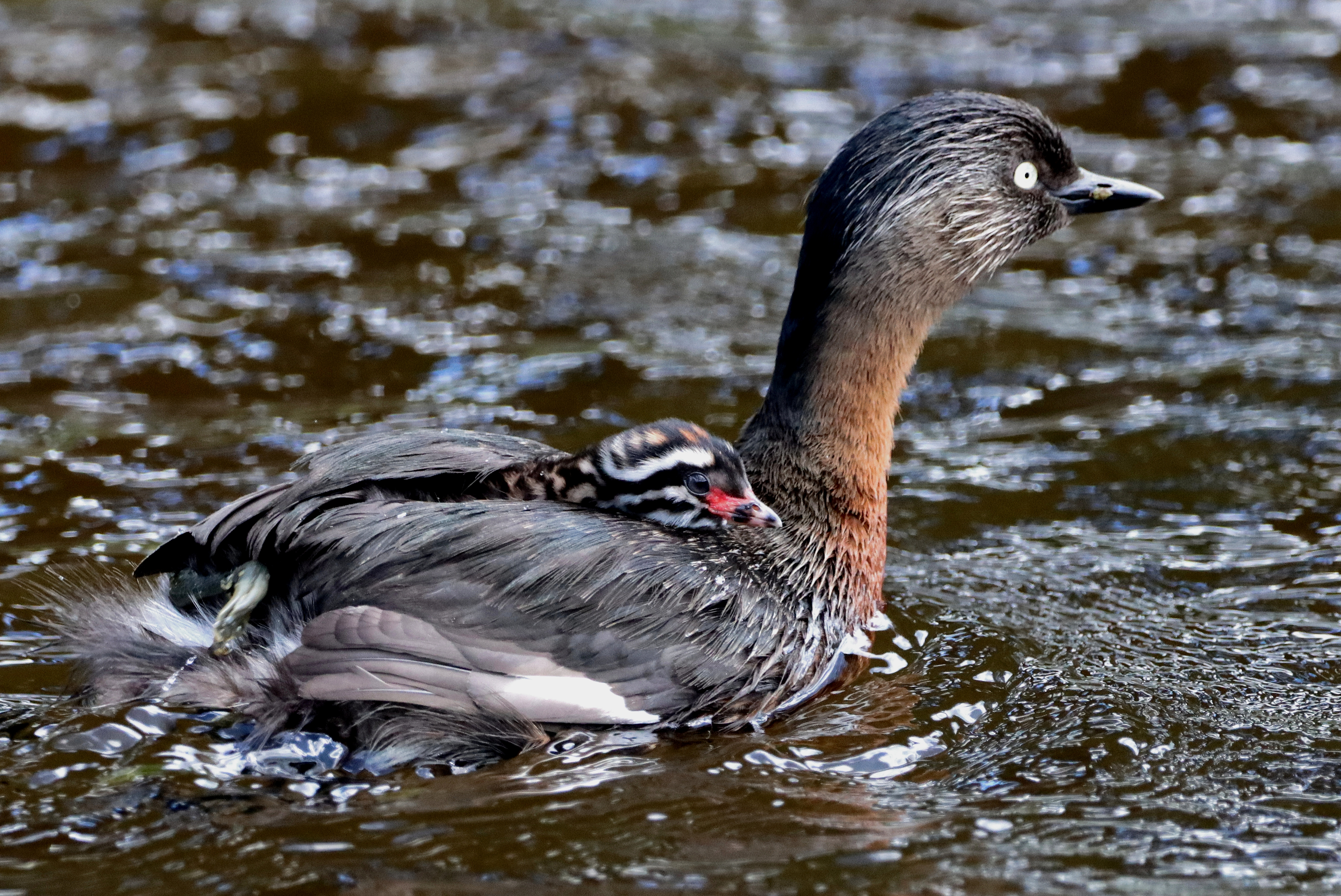
Adult with young chick

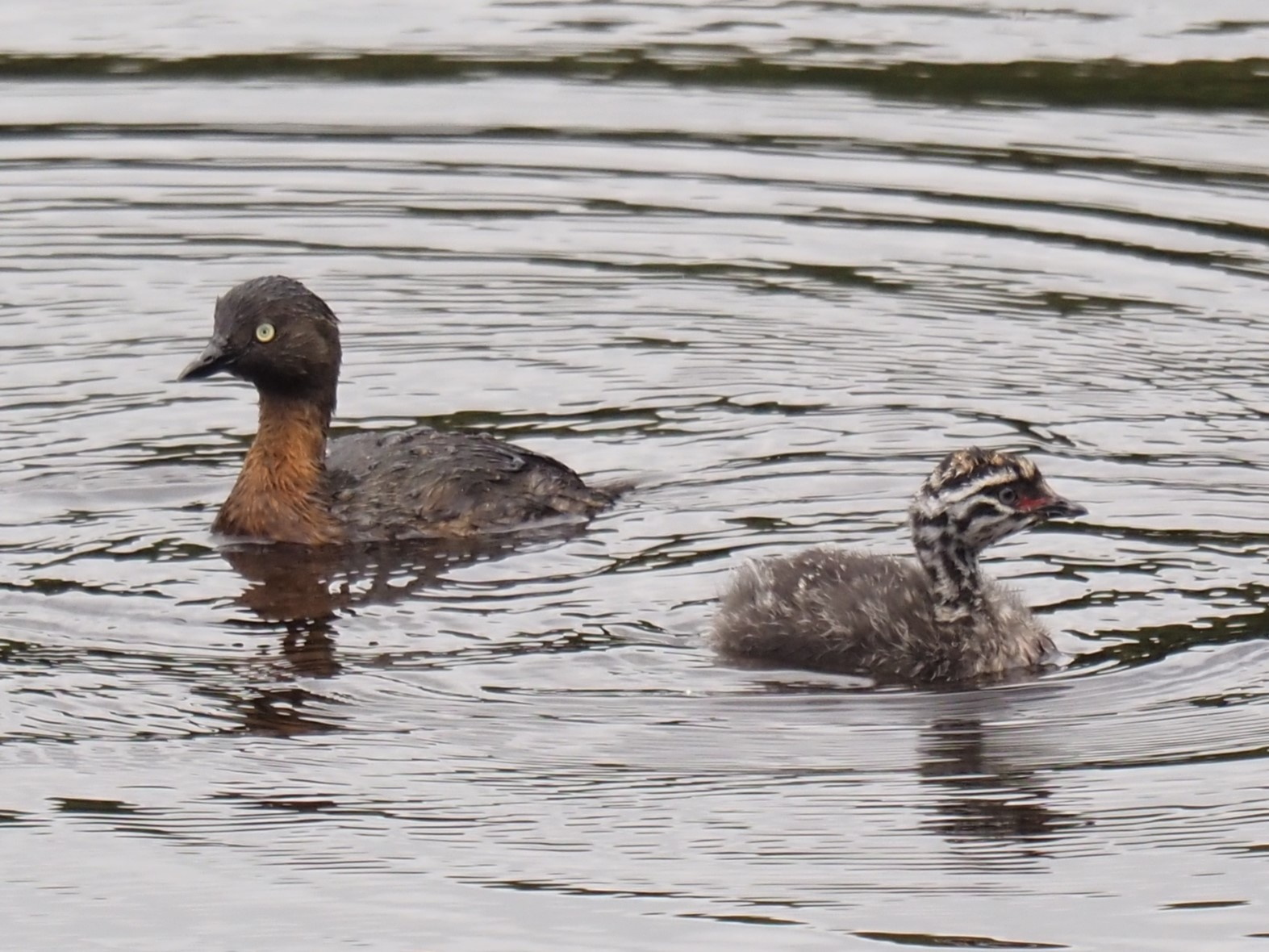
Adult and chick at Queen Elizabeth Park, Kāpiti Coast District

The breeding season is from June to March. On average 2–3 eggs are laid and incubated 22–23 days by both female and male, in a nest. The nest is mostly made out of surrounding vegetation, including floating plant material. Hatched chicks are precocial, although being flightless for the first few weeks they can swim and dive. Both parents assist in rearing and feeding their young for up to 70 days after hatching. Until the adult plumage develops, the chick has irregular striped markings on head and neck and the bill is black.

== Conservation ==
This species is endemic to New Zealand and is nowadays only found in the North Island. In 1994, the IUCN classified the New Zealand dabchick as Endangered, but due to conservation actions including habitat management, its population has recently increased to around 1,900–2,000 birds and was reclassified as Near Threatened in 2016, and to least concern in 2022. Human activity currently has a net benefit as artificial habitat, including farm dams and ponds formed for stock water supplies, increases the area of occupation for the grebes. So although the population is still quite small it is thought to no longer be in decline.
