= Wellington tramway =

Wellington tramway may refer to:

- Wellington tramway system, operated from 1878 to 1964 in New Zealand's capital city
- Wellington Tramway Museum, established in 1965 after the closure of the Wellington tramway system

== See also ==
- Trams in New Zealand
