= Raumati =

Raumati is a New Zealand place name and may refer to:

- Raumati Beach, Kapiti Coast, New Zealand
- Raumati South, Kapiti Coast, New Zealand
- Raumati Hearts, a former name of Kapiti Coast United, a New Zealand association football club
- Raumati railway station, a proposed station on the Kāpiti Line
- Raumati, Tasman, a locality
