= Pharazyn Reserve =

Public reserve in New Zealand

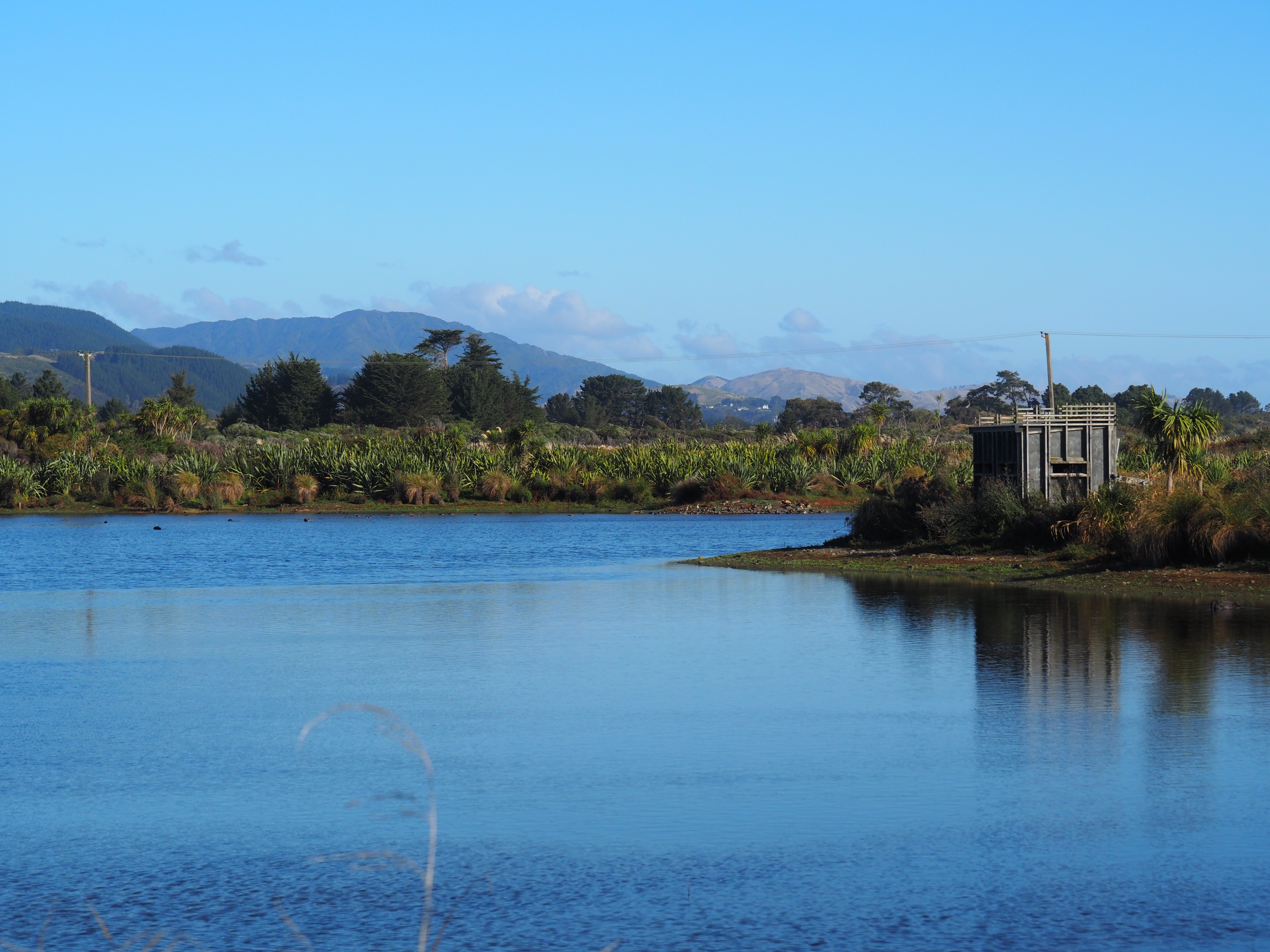
- Pond and bird hide
- Interactive map of Pharazyn Reserve
- Location: Waikanae, New Zealand
- Coordinates: 40°50′55.32″S 175°2′45.6″E
- Area: 41 hectares (100 acres)
- Operator: Kapiti Coast District Council
- Open: 24 hours
- Website: Pharazyn Reserve

Pharazyn Reserve is a public reserve located north of Waikanae, on the Kapiti Coast of the North Island of New Zealand. It is located adjacent to the Te Harakeke Swamp, a regionally significant area of harakeke and raupō wetland. The reserve covers an area of 41 ha (100 acres), and is managed by the Kapiti Coast District Council. The site was originally established as a sewage treatment plant in the 1970s, but was decommissioned in 2002. A long term environmental restoration project was commenced to restore the site as a recreation and wildlife reserve. The site is now described as one of the top 10 birdwatching sites in the Wellington Region. Recreational facilities in the reserve include walking paths, a children's playground with a flying fox, toilets and a bird hide overlooking one of the ponds.

== Toponymy ==
The reserve is named after Noel Pharazyn. In 1919, Pharazyn married Lydia Field, who was the daughter of a wealthy farming family with land in the Waikanae area. The couple had no surviving children, and on his death in 1980, the family wealth was transferred to the W N Pharazyn Trust that supports environmental and humanitarian causes in New Zealand. The present site of Pharazyn Reserve was originally part of the Field family farm.

== History ==
The site was originally developed in the 1970s as a sewage treatment plant serving Waikanae. Two oxidation ponds were constructed in a wetland area and a spray irrigation site established on dunes near to the beach. There were multiple issues with the performance of the Waikanae sewage treatment plant including seepage into neighbouring waterways. In 1999, a decision was made to decommission the plant, and pump Waikanae sewage to Paraparaumu for treatment and disposal. The objective was to eliminate the long-standing problems with the existing treatment plant, and transform the area into a recreation reserve.

In 2001, a project commenced to build a 7 km (4.3 mi) pipeline to carry sewage from Waikanae to an upgraded treatment facility at Paraparaumu. The upgraded plant began treating sewage from Paraparaumu and Waikanae in March 2002, and discharges to the Waikanae pond ceased. The facility was decommissioned in 2002, and a long-term project commenced to restore the site as a passive recreation area and wildlife reserve.

In 2018 the Kapiti Coast District Council classified Pharazyn Reserve as a local purpose reserve under the Reserves Act 1977.

== Environmental restoration ==
The adjacent Te Harakeke Swamp is a regionally significant area of harakeke and raupō wetland.

In 1999, work commenced to remove the invasive species Manchurian wild rice from around the treatment plant and the adjacent swamp. This was expected to take two years and was part of preparatory work to return the area of the sewage treatment plant to a more natural state.

Environmental restoration work at the site began around 2007. Much of the work has been carried out by community volunteers who engage with the Kapiti Coast District Council through the Pharazyn Reserve Focus Group. The restoration work has included plantings of native species, with a focus on plantings by local primary school groups on each Arbor Day. Species planted have been selected from akeake, kānuka, harakeke, ngaio, toetoe, taupata and red matipo (or māpou).

Invasive weeds are considered the greatest threat to the ecology of the dune areas of the reserve. The Greater Wellington Regional Council controls invasive weed species in the coastal area such as pampas, boxthorn, gorse and blackberry. There are also annual surveys and control measures for Manchurian wild rice.

== Birds ==
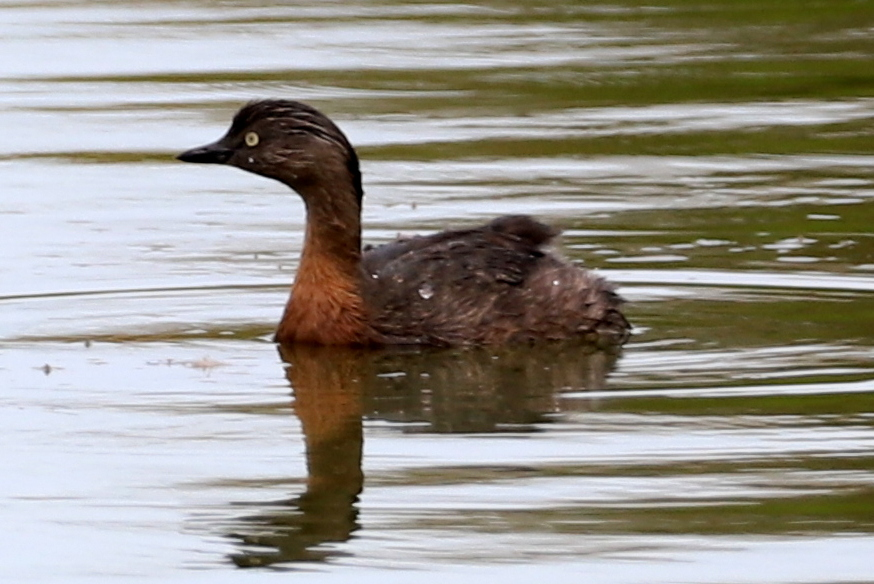
New Zealand dabchick

The reserve has been described as one of the top 10 birdwatching sites in the Wellington region. Birds that may be seen at the reserve include New Zealand scaup, New Zealand dabchick, Royal spoonbill, and several species of shag.

== Recreation facilities ==
As part of the plan to transform the area into a reserve, recreational facilities have been established, including walking paths, a children's playground with a flying fox, toilets and a bird hide overlooking one of the ponds.

== Gallery ==
Pharazyn Reserve

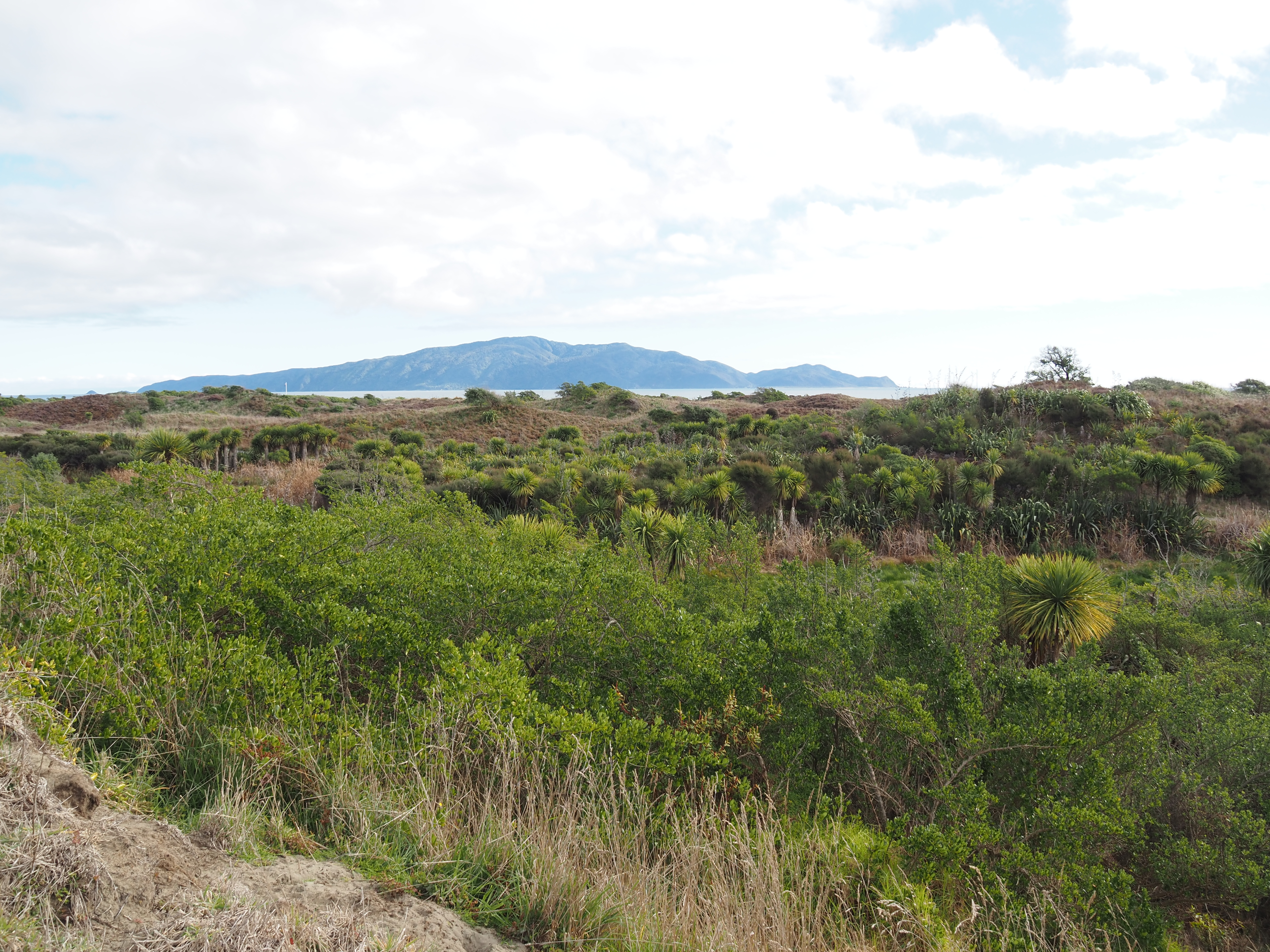
View of Kapiti Island from dunelands

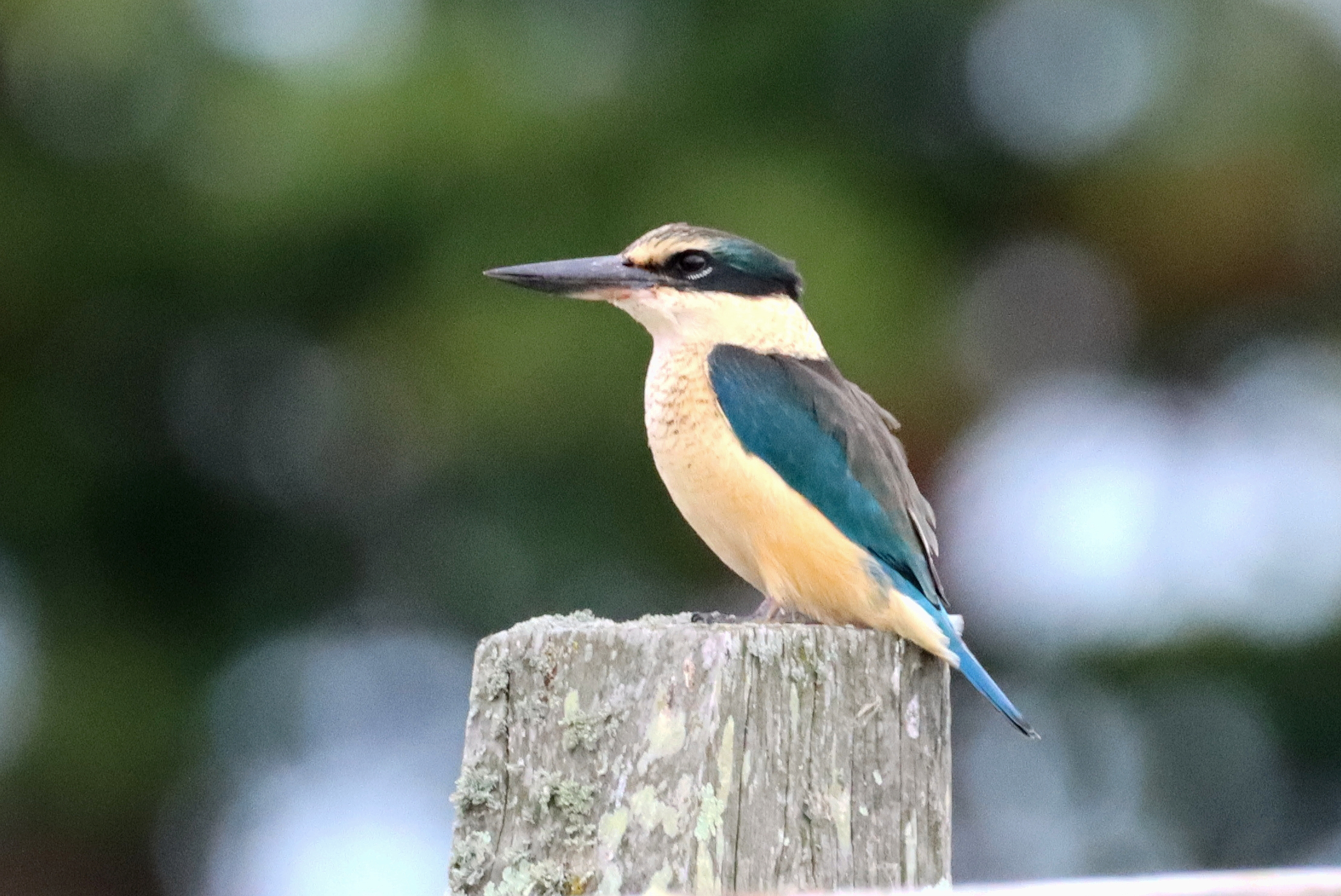
Sacred kingfisher

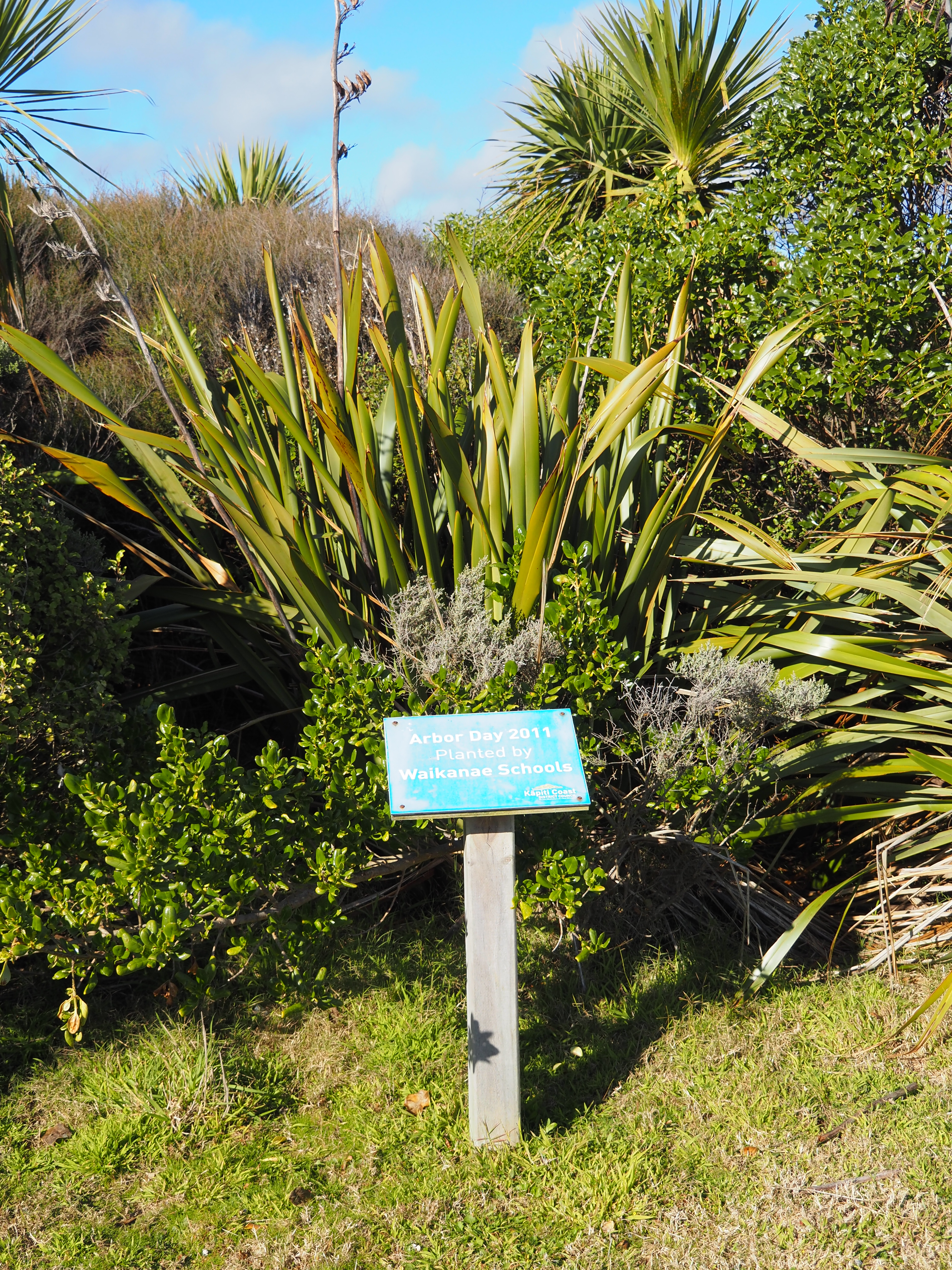
Restoration planting by Waikanae Schools (2011)

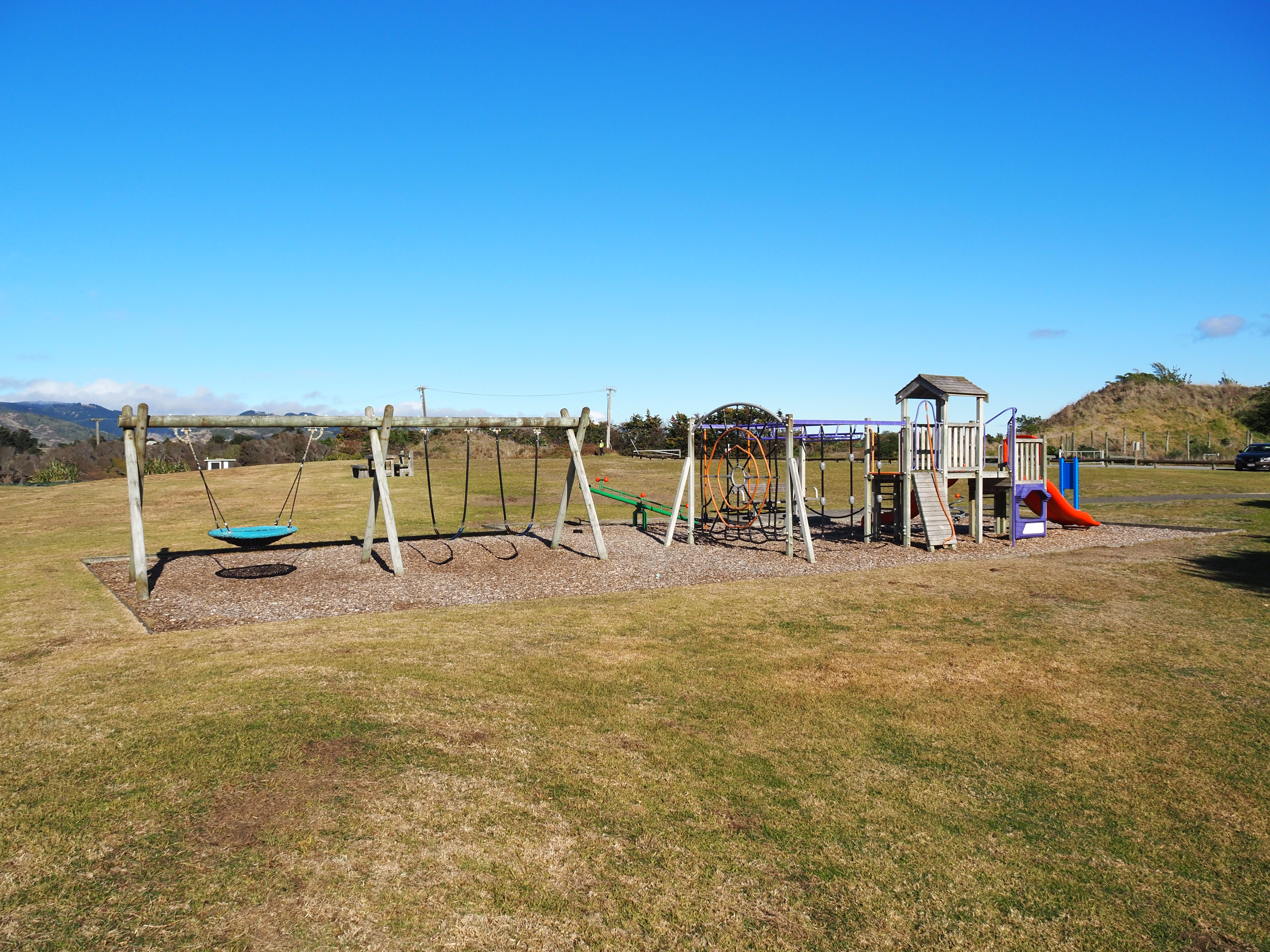
Children's playground

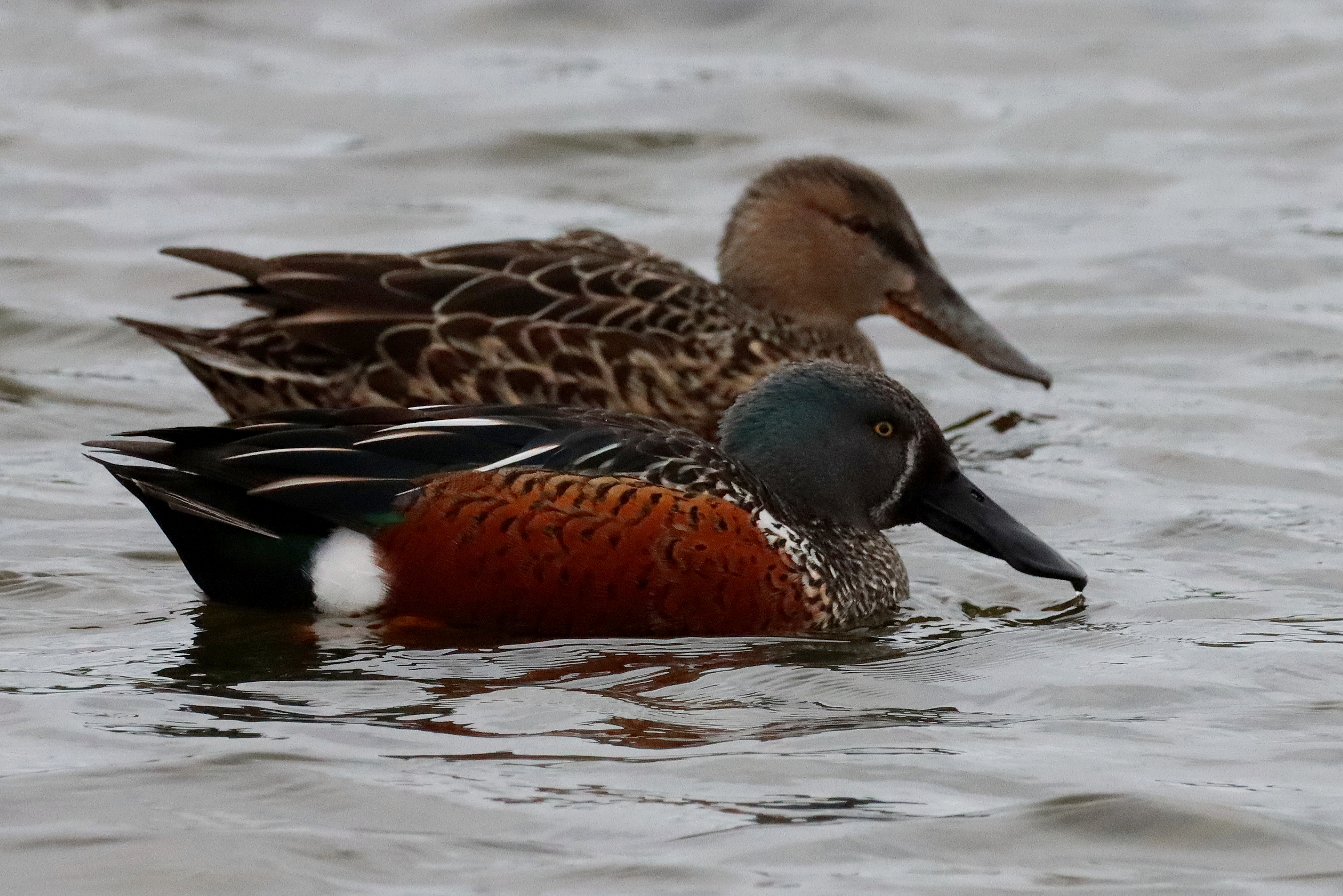
Male and female shoveler

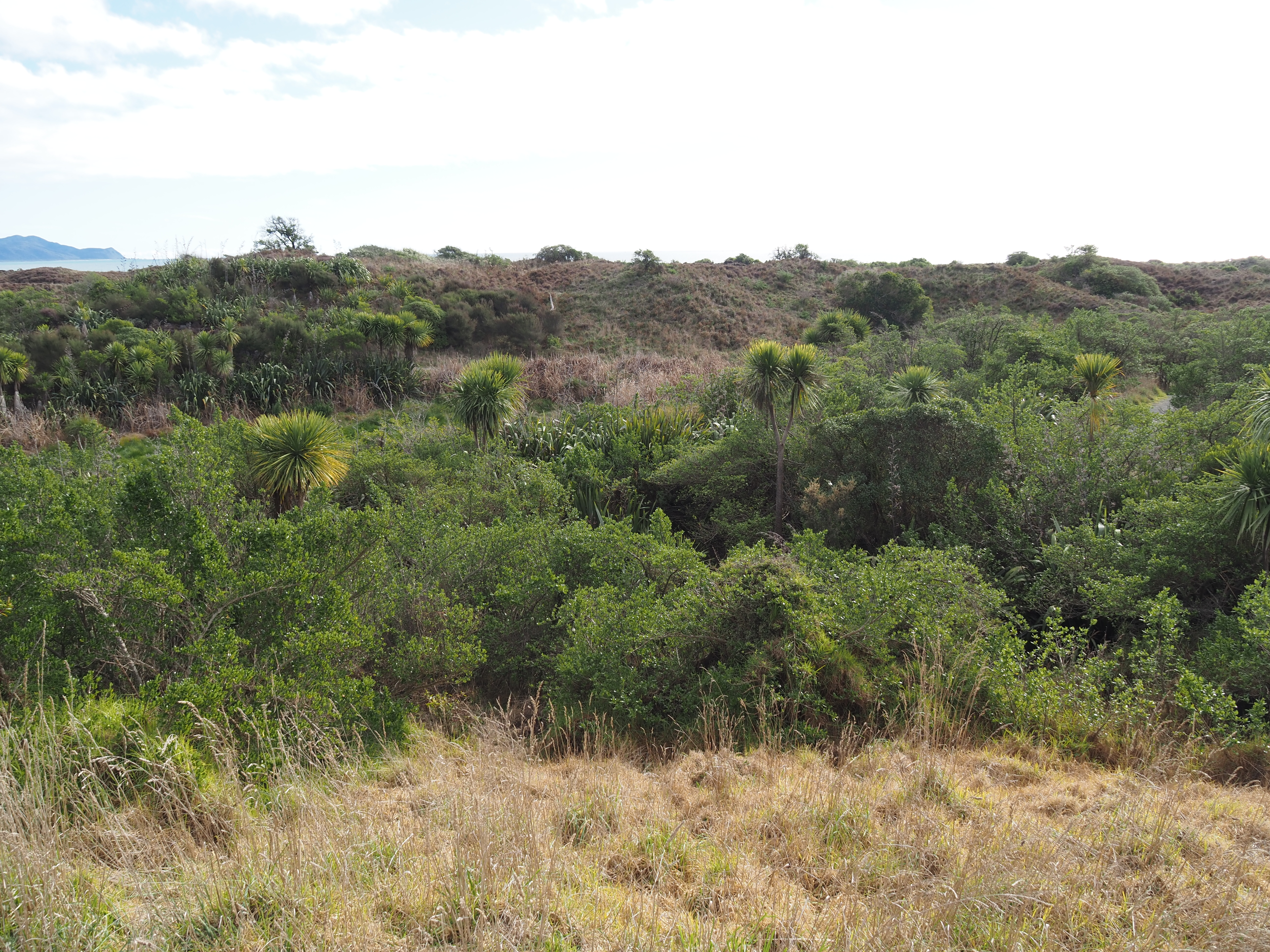
Dunelands
