= Ōtaki Museum =

Museum on the Kāpiti Coast, New Zealand

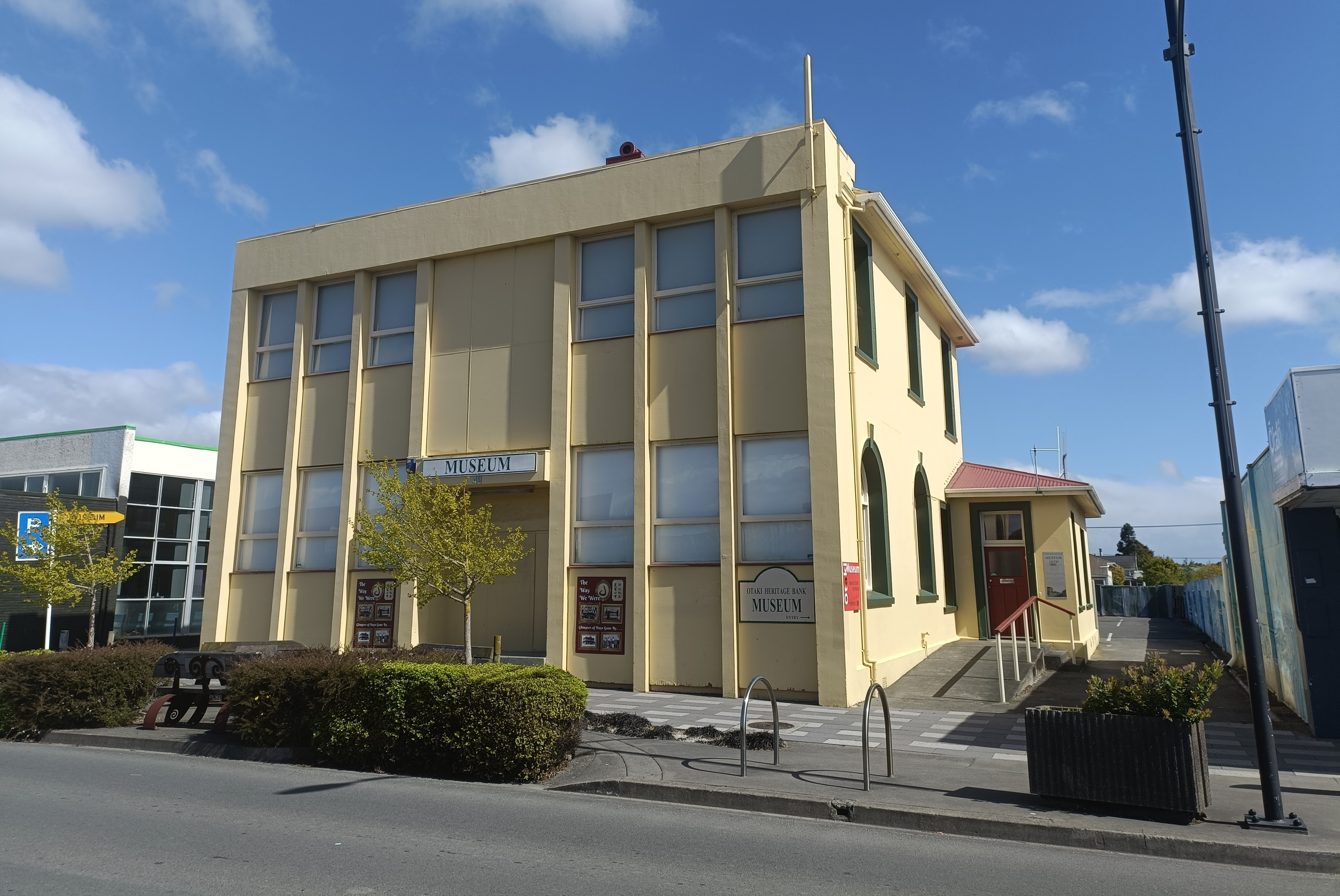
- The Ōtaki Museum, housed in the former Otaki Bank of New Zealand
- Established: 2003
- Location: Ōtaki, Kāpiti Coast District, Wellington Region, New Zealand
- Coordinates: 40.75268°S 175.13908°E
- Website: www.otakiheritage.org.nz

Ōtaki Museum, housed in the former Bank of New Zealand building in Ōtaki, has as its main purpose the preservation and sharing of Ōtaki's history.

== History ==
The museum is housed in a Council-owned building located at 49 Main Street, Ōtaki. The building is a two-storied concrete building with polished wood floors, pressed steel ceilings and has a Heritage New Zealand Pouhere Taonga Category 2 listing. The building was built for the Bank of New Zealand in 1918. It was one of the buildings which architect John Mair designed, collaborated on or supervised the design of. In 1965 the Otaki Borough Council purchased the building and it was used as the Borough's Council offices until the amalgamation of the Borough into the Kāpiti Coast District Council in 1989.

The Otaki Heritage Bank Preservation Trust was formed in 2003 with the goal of collecting, preserving and sharing Ōtaki's history through a programme of changing exhibitions of stories, images and other artefacts. The Trust became a registered charitable trust on 30 June 2008.

In 2003, the Kapiti Coast District Council leased the building to the Trust and the Museum has occupied the premises since that time.

== Collections ==
The Museum's collections include:

- Records of organisations (Otaki Borough Council, Tennis Club, Swimming Club)
- Local archival material
- The Small Collection
- The Wallace Collection

== Otaki Historical Society ==
The records and collection of the Otaki Historical Society are housed in the Museum.
