= Queen Elizabeth Park, Kāpiti Coast =

Park in New Zealand

Queen Elizabeth Park
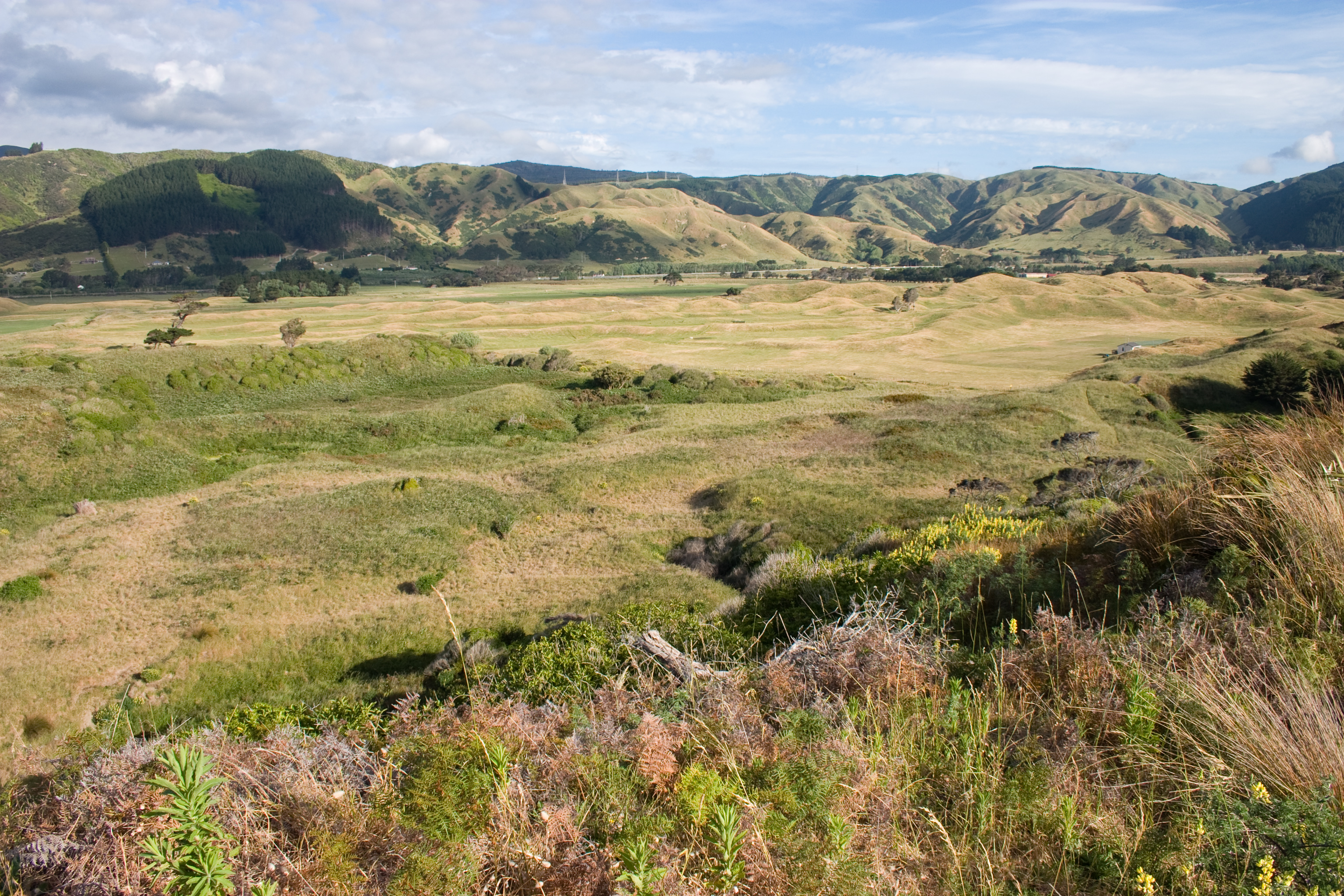
- Queen Elizabeth Park, looking towards State Highway One
- Interactive map of Queen Elizabeth Park
- Type: Regional park
- Location: Kāpiti Coast, New Zealand
- Coordinates: 40.964928°S 174.969335°E
- Area: 638 hectares (1,580 acres)
- Created: 1953
- Operator: Wellington Regional Council
- Open: 8am-dusk
- Status: Open

Queen Elizabeth Park is a regional park located on the Kāpiti Coast in New Zealand. The park is managed by the Greater Wellington Regional Council and contains the last area of natural dunes on the Kāpiti Coast. Facilities and attractions at the park include walkways, a restored wetland, a campground, a visitor centre, the Wellington Tramway Museum, and an area for equestrian activities.

== Geography ==
The park is bordered by Paekākāriki, Raumati South, two state highways (SH 1 and SH 59), and the North Island Main Trunk Railway.

The main entrance is at Mackays Crossing; secondary entrances are in Raumati South and Paekākāriki.

== History ==
The park is steeped in history including pā sites at Whareroa Beach and Wainui Beach. The tangata whenua of the park are Ngāti Haumia, a hapū of the Ngāti Toa iwi and Te Atiawa ki Whakarongotai, who occupied the area until the mid-19th century.

The number of European settlers grew during the 1830s, and European farmers started to dominate the area from the mid-1850s.

During World War II, the park was the location of two United States Army and Marines bases, Camp MacKay and Camp Russell. U.S. troops were stationed at the camps in 1942–44 prior to being sent into combat in the Pacific Ocean theatre. Today, little evidence of the 20,000 strong military camps remains. A group of facades represents the huts of the marines who lived in the area during World War II, and there is also a sculpture memorial to ten marines who died when a vessel sank offshore.

The park was named for Queen Elizabeth II before her coronation and was opened during the 1953 Royal Visit. Many recreation facilities were developed in the 1950s and 1960s.

The park has legal protection as a recreation reserve under the Reserves Act 1977.

== Restoration of wetland ==
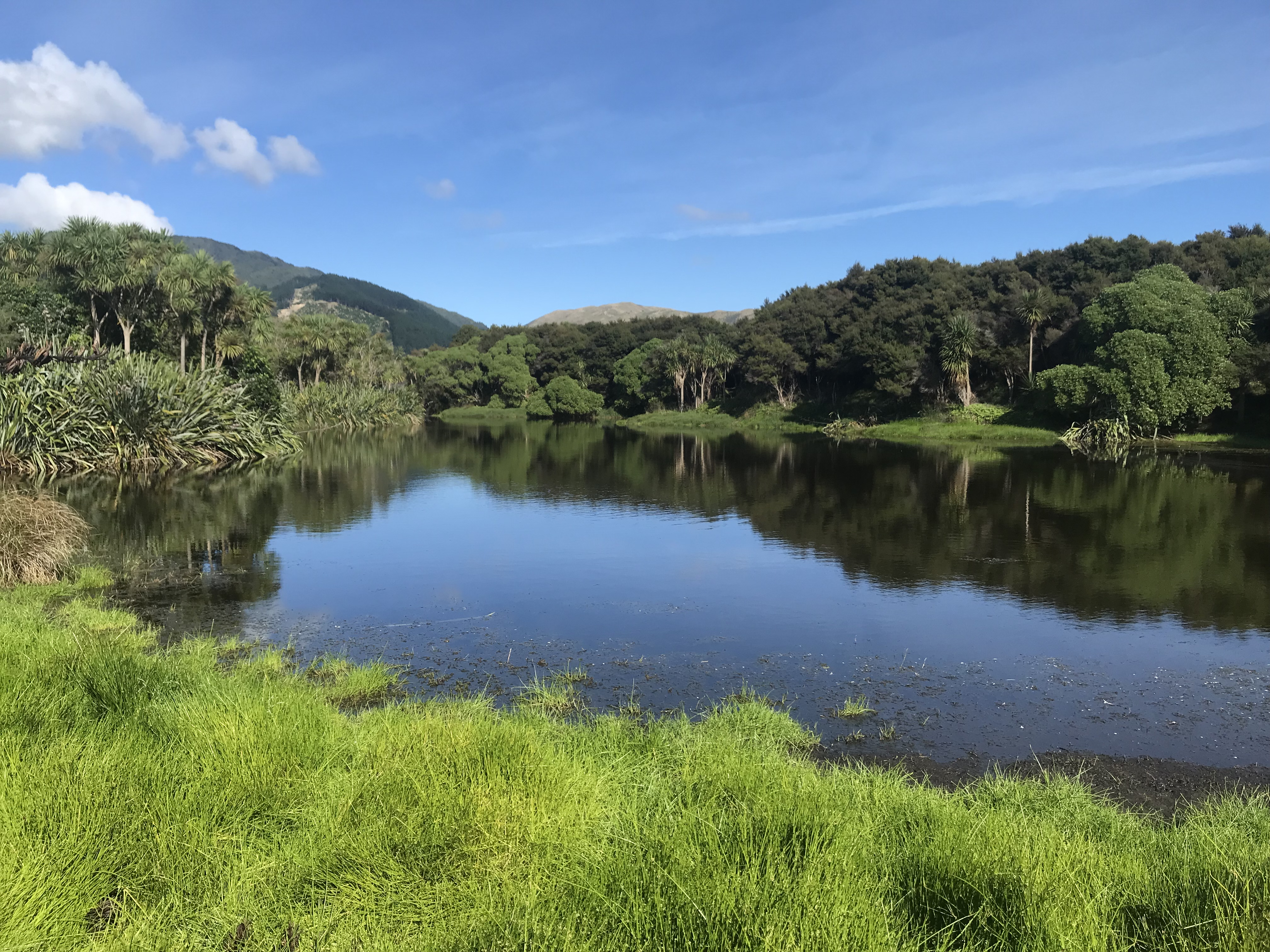
Wetland scene at Queen Elizabeth Park

Two areas of wetland were created within the park in the 2000s near Mackay's Crossing, using excavation and plantings to restore the habitat. There is a remnant of native bush adjacent to the restored wetland.

In 2021, about 25 hectares (62 acres) of highly modified peat land on the north-eastern corner of the park was replanted, to restore it to wetland and native forest by about 2026. Environmentalists wanted other farmland in the regional park to also be restored to wetland.

In December 2021, 200 hectares (490 acres) of land previously leased for grazing stock was retired so that it could be restored.

== Visitor centre ==
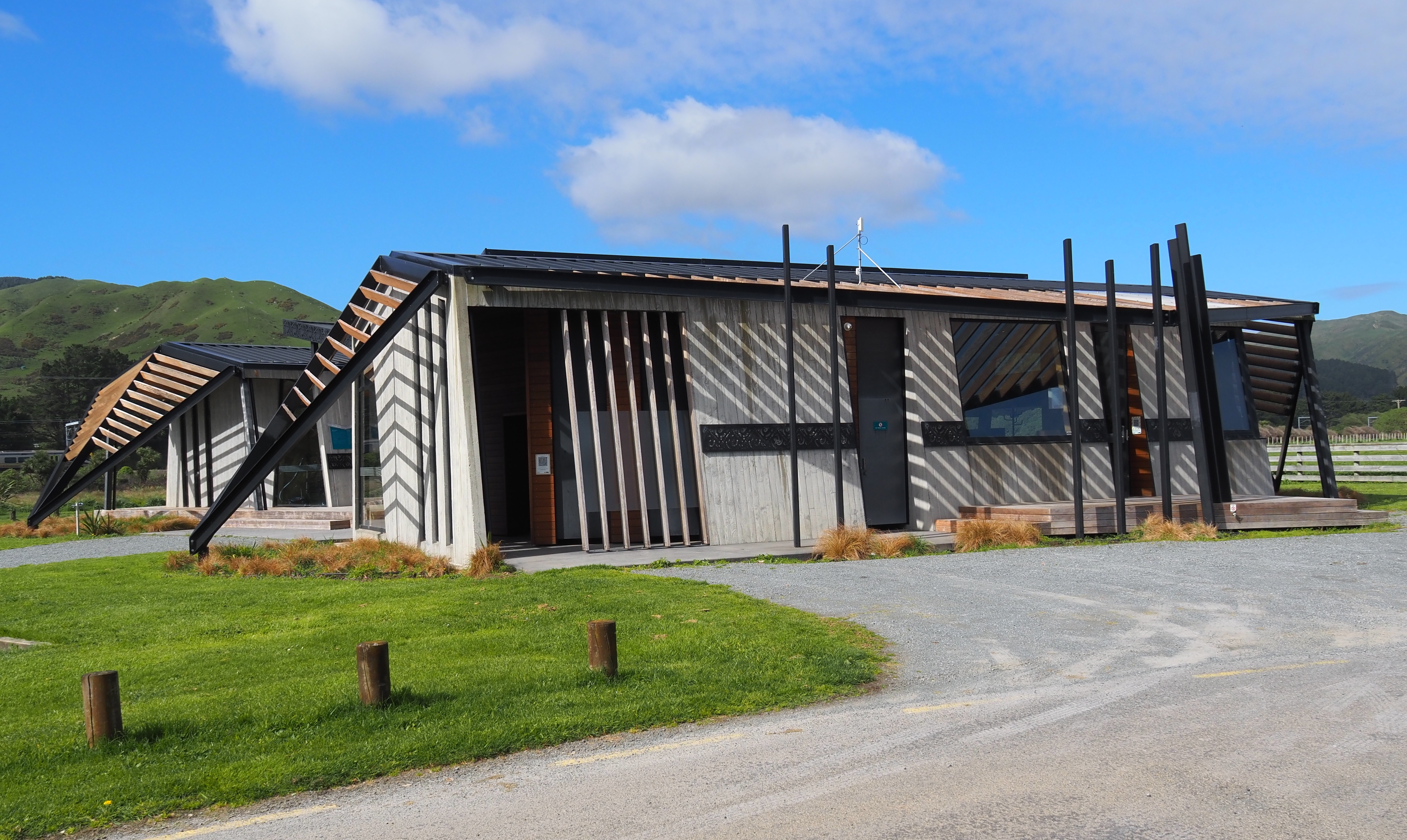
Ramaroa Centre – Mackays Crossing, Queen Elizabeth Park

Plans for the development of the park facilities at the Mackays Crossing entrance were announced in 2012. A visitor centre named Ramaroa was opened in 2017. The complex includes a meeting room with capacity for 60 people, a park ranger office and public toilets. The design of the Ramaroa Centre is unusual and includes a gullwing roof. The architecture takes inspiration from the history of the site, including Māori wharenui and the forms of the tents and huts used in the US Marines camp.

== Recreation ==
Several expansive lawn areas near Whareroa Beach and the southern entrance at Paekākāriki provide plenty of space for picnics and recreational activities. Public toilets are located at the car parks at the end of the road to Whareroa Beach, and near the playground and car parks at the Paekākāriki entrance.

A coastal walkway and an inland walkway run the length of Queen Elizabeth Park from Raumati South to Paekākārikii. Near the main entrance, a loop walkway leads through a wetland area and bush remnant with mature kahikatea.

The park also includes the Wellington Tramway Museum and several campgrounds.

The park is open from 8 am to dusk, year-round. Dogs are permitted, but must be kept on a leash in picnic areas and are not permitted on or near farmland. Fireworks are prohibited at all times.
