= Kāpiti Coast District =

South-western section of the coast of North Island, New Zealand

- Territorial authority district
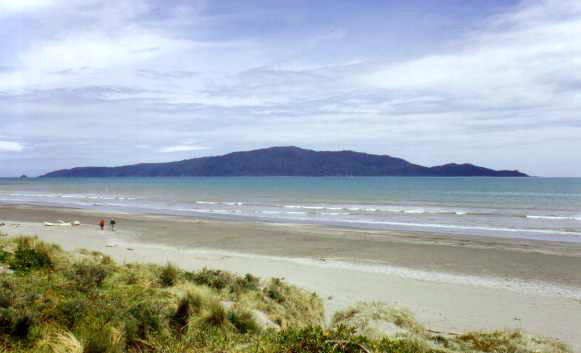
- Looking across Waikanae Beach to Kapiti Island

- Kāpiti Coast district within the North Island
- Coordinates: 40°50′38″S 175°11′10″E
- Country: New Zealand
- Region: Wellington
- Wards: Ōtaki; Waikanae; Paraparaumu; Paekākāriki-Raumati
- Community Boards: Paekākāriki Community Board; Paraparaumu Community Board; Raumati Community Board; Waikanae Community Board; Ōtaki Community Board
- Established: 1989
- Electorates: Kapiti (general); Te Tai Hauāuru (Māori)

Government
  - Mayor: Janet Holborow
  - Territorial authority: Kāpiti Coast District Council
  - MPs: Tim Costley (New Zealand National Party); Debbie Ngarewa-Packer (Te Pāti Māori)

Area
  - Territorial: 731.52 km^{2} (282.44 sq mi)
  - Urban: 76.69 km^{2} (29.61 sq mi)
  - Rural: 654.83 km^{2} (252.83 sq mi)

Population (June 2025)
  - Territorial: 58,000
  - Density: 79/km^{2} (210/sq mi)
- Time zone: UTC+12 (NZST)
  - Summer (DST): UTC+13 (NZDT)
- Postcode(s): 5032, 5034, 5036, 5381, 5391, 5512, 5573, 5581, 5582, 5583
- Website: www.kapiticoast.govt.nz

The Kāpiti Coast District (officially the Kapiti Coast District) is a local government district of the Wellington Region in the lower North Island of New Zealand, 50 km (31 mi) north of Wellington City. The district is named after Kapiti Island, a prominent island 5 kilometres (3.1 mi) offshore.

The population of the district is concentrated in a chain of coastal settlements along State Highway One: Ōtaki, Te Horo, Waikanae, Paraparaumu, Raumati Beach, Raumati South, and Paekākāriki. Paraparaumu is the most populous of these towns and the commercial and administrative centre. Much of the rural land is given over to horticulture; market gardens are common along the highway between the settlements. The area available for agriculture and settlement is narrow and coastal. Much of the eastern part of the district is within the Tararua Forest Park, which covers the rugged Tararua Range, with peaks rising to over 1,500 m (4,900 ft).

== Geography ==
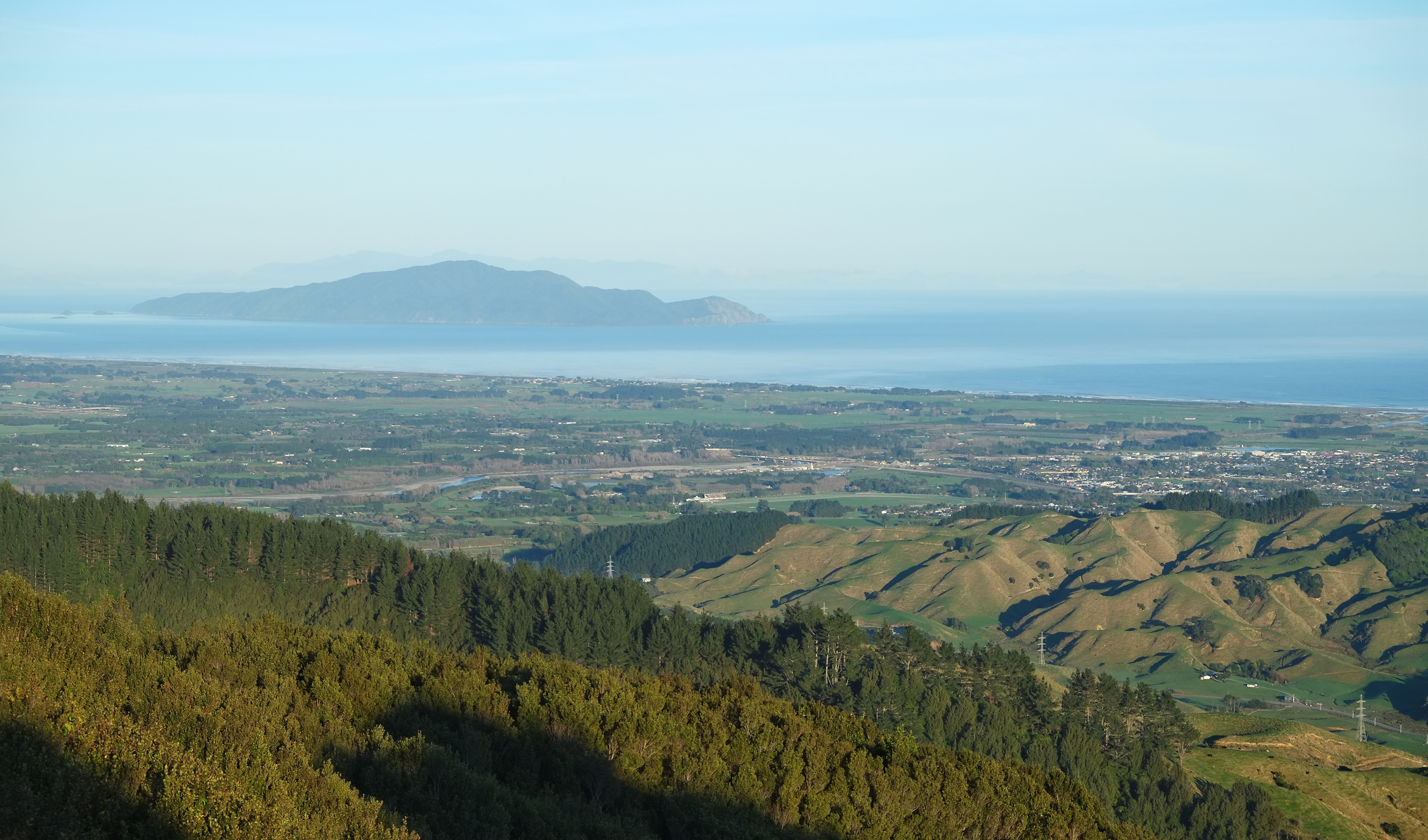
Kapiti Island and the Kāpiti Coast from a hill in Tararua Forest Park. The town of Ōtaki is visible on the right.

The Kāpiti Coast District stretches from Ōtaki in the north to Paekākāriki in the south. It includes the towns of Te Horo, Waikanae, Paraparaumu, Raumati Beach, Raumati South, and smaller localities such as Maungakotukutuku, Otaihanga, and Peka Peka. It extends from the Tasman Sea coast to the top of the Tararua Range. Kapiti Island, a prominent offshore feature, is part of the district.

The district is not generally considered part of the Wellington metropolitan area, being distant from Wellington City, Porirua and the Hutt Valley, which make up the nucleus of the area. Still, Waikanae is considered by many to be the absolute northernmost point Wellington can be considered to reach as a city. Many residents travel into Wellington each day for work, and the district is a popular weekend destination for the people of the Wellington Region. The town of Paraparaumu, considered the pivot of the district, is located about 55 km north of Wellington.

The area has an oceanic climate with moderate temperature swings between seasons, resulting in warm summers and mild winters without any severe heat waves or cold spells.

== History ==
The district was occupied by the Muaūpoko Māori tribe up to the 19th century. Ngāti Toa, led by chief Te Rauparaha, migrated to the district in the 1820s. Te Rauparaha established a base on Kapiti Island, from where he was able to launch attacks on other tribes during the Musket Wars of the early 19th century. Around this time, Europeans began whaling in the area, and on 16 October 1839, William Wakefield of the New Zealand Company arrived in the Kapiti region to purchase land for permanent European settlement. Te Rauparaha sold him land in the Nelson and Golden Bay area.

European settlement of the Kāpiti Coast only took place on a significant scale after the Wellington and Manawatu Railway Company (WMR) opened its railway line from Wellington to Longburn, just south of Palmerston North. The line was opened in 1886, with the final spike driven in on the Kāpiti Coast at Otaihanga. Paekākāriki was quickly established as a significant steam locomotive depot due to the need to swap locomotives at the location; powerful, heavy locomotives were required to handle trains over the rugged section from Wellington to Paekākāriki, while lighter, faster locomotives were more suited to the relatively flat terrain north of Paekākāriki. In 1908, the WMR was purchased by the New Zealand Railways Department, who incorporated the line into the North Island Main Trunk railway.

In June 1940, the Wellington-Paekākāriki section was electrified as electric locomotives provided better motive power. This meant trains would swap from steam (and later diesel-electric) to electric traction in Paekākāriki, and it retained its status as a significant locomotive depot. It also became the northern terminus of the Wellington commuter railway network until 8 May 1983, when it was extended to Paraparaumu. In February 2011, electrification reached Waikanae, which became the new terminus.

During World War II, Queen Elizabeth Park – a large tract of parkland between Raumati South and Paekākāriki – was the location of two United States Army and Marines camps, McKay and Russell. US troops were stationed at the camps in 1942–44 prior to being sent into combat in the Pacific Ocean theatre.

After World War II, Wellington's Rongotai Airport was closed due to safety reasons in 1947 and Kapiti Coast Airport became the main airport for the Wellington Region. In 1949, it was New Zealand's busiest airport and helped to stimulate growth on the Kāpiti Coast. The Wellington International Airport was opened in 1959 and Paraparaumu Airport never regained its status, with some of its land sold for residential development in the 1990s and 2000s.

== Name and etymology ==
Although "Kapiti Coast District" is the official name of the district, the council uses the spelling "Kāpiti" for its name. Despite sharing the same spelling, the name is unrelated to the Māori word for "cabbage" (Māori: kāpiti).

In April 2010 the council starting using macrons in the spelling of Kāpiti, Ōtaki and Paekākāriki in council papers, publications, maps and signage. Despite this, the council did not make an application to the New Zealand Geographic Board to add a macron to the name of the district as the macron is used to aid pronunciation rather than spelling.

In a back and forth manner, vandals have repeatedly added and removed macrons from signage in the district.

== Administration ==
=== District Council ===
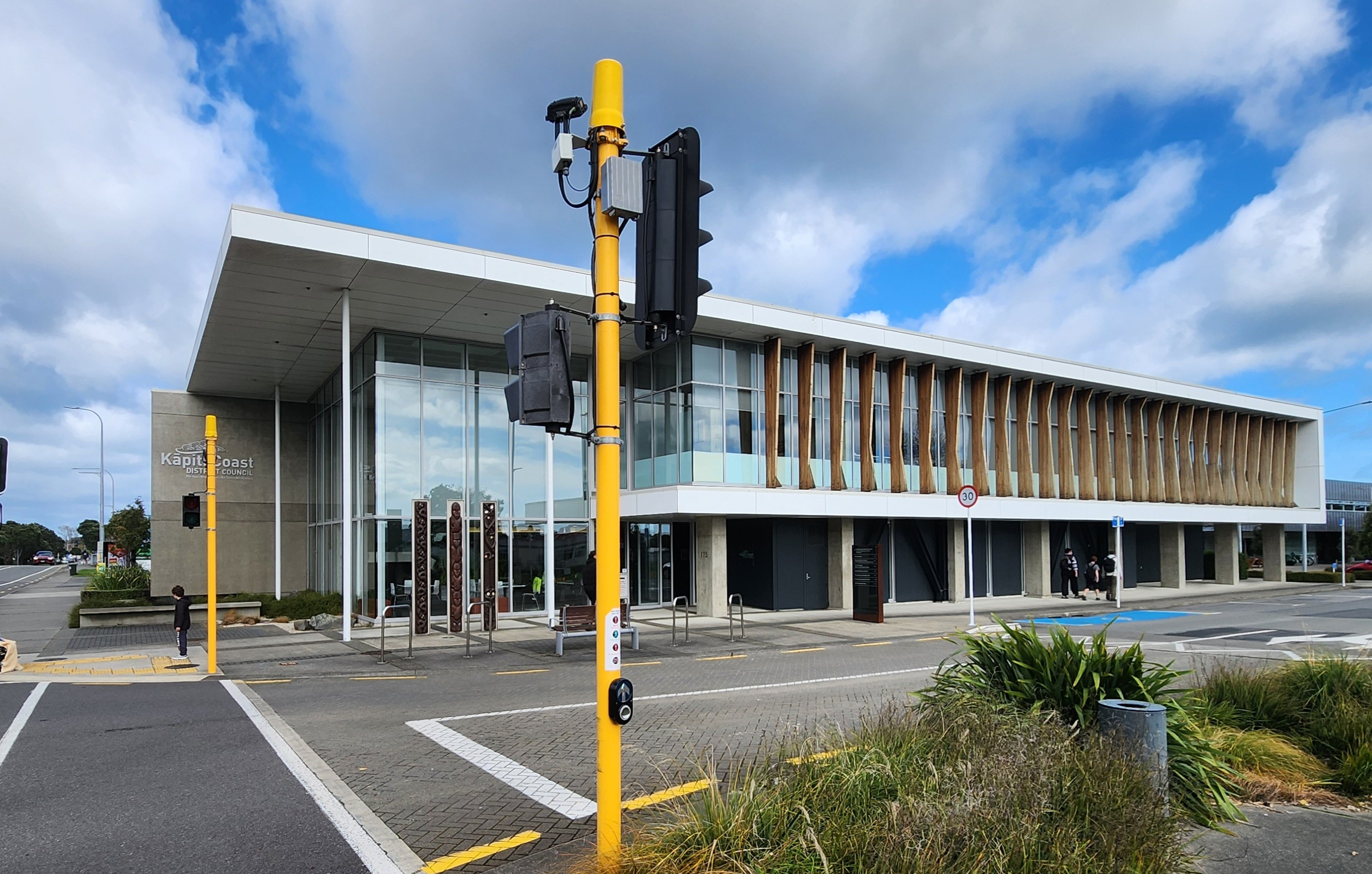
The Kāpiti Coast District Council civic building was opened in 2013.

The parts of the district south of the Waikanae River were originally part of the now defunct Hutt County. The Kapiti Borough Council was carved from it in 1973.

In New Zealand's local government reforms of 1989, the borough council was replaced by the Kapiti Coast District Council, and the area under its jurisdiction expanded northwards to include Waikanae and Ōtaki, which had been part of the Horowhenua County. The council is a territorial authority with a governing body that is elected by residents every three years. The governing body consists of a mayor and 10 councillors. Two councillors are elected for the Paraparaumu ward, one each for the Ōtaki, Paekākāriki-Raumati and Waikanae wards, and five are elected at-large. Kapiti Island is part of the Paraparaumu ward.

=== Regional Council ===
Greater Wellington Regional Council is responsible for regional governance of the district and the wider region, including public transport, water and environmental management.

== Demographics ==
Kāpiti Coast District covers 731.52 km^{2} (282.44 sq mi) and had an estimated population of 58,000 as of June 2025, with a population density of 79 people per km^{2}.

Historical population
Year	Pop.	±% p.a.
2006	46,197	—
2013	49,104	+0.88%
2018	53,673	+1.80%
2023	55,914	+0.82%

Kāpiti Coast District had a population of 55,914 in the 2023 New Zealand census, an increase of 2,241 people (4.2%) since the 2018 census, and an increase of 6,810 people (13.9%) since the 2013 census. There were 26,523 males, 29,139 females and 252 people of other genders in 23,097 dwellings. 3.7% of people identified as LGBTIQ+. The median age was 48.8 years (compared with 38.1 years nationally). There were 9,057 people (16.2%) aged under 15 years, 7,659 (13.7%) aged 15 to 29, 24,282 (43.4%) aged 30 to 64, and 14,916 (26.7%) aged 65 or older.

People could identify as more than one ethnicity. The results were 86.6% European (Pākehā); 15.8% Māori; 3.8% Pasifika; 6.2% Asian; 1.0% Middle Eastern, Latin American and African New Zealanders (MELAA); and 2.7% other, which includes people giving their ethnicity as "New Zealander". English was spoken by 97.6%, Māori language by 4.7%, Samoan by 0.5% and other languages by 10.0%. No language could be spoken by 1.6% (e.g. too young to talk). New Zealand Sign Language was known by 0.6%. The percentage of people born overseas was 23.5, compared with 28.8% nationally.

Religious affiliations were 31.3% Christian, 0.8% Hindu, 0.3% Islam, 0.6% Māori religious beliefs, 0.6% Buddhist, 0.6% New Age, 0.1% Jewish, and 1.3% other religions. People who answered that they had no religion were 57.5%, and 7.1% of people did not answer the census question.

Of those at least 15 years old, 9,516 (20.3%) people had a bachelor's or higher degree, 24,621 (52.5%) had a post-high school certificate or diploma, and 9,537 (20.4%) people exclusively held high school qualifications. The median income was $39,100, compared with $41,500 nationally. 6,636 people (14.2%) earned over $100,000 compared to 12.1% nationally. The employment status of those at least 15 was that 20,856 (44.5%) people were employed full-time, 6,711 (14.3%) were part-time, and 1,080 (2.3%) were unemployed.

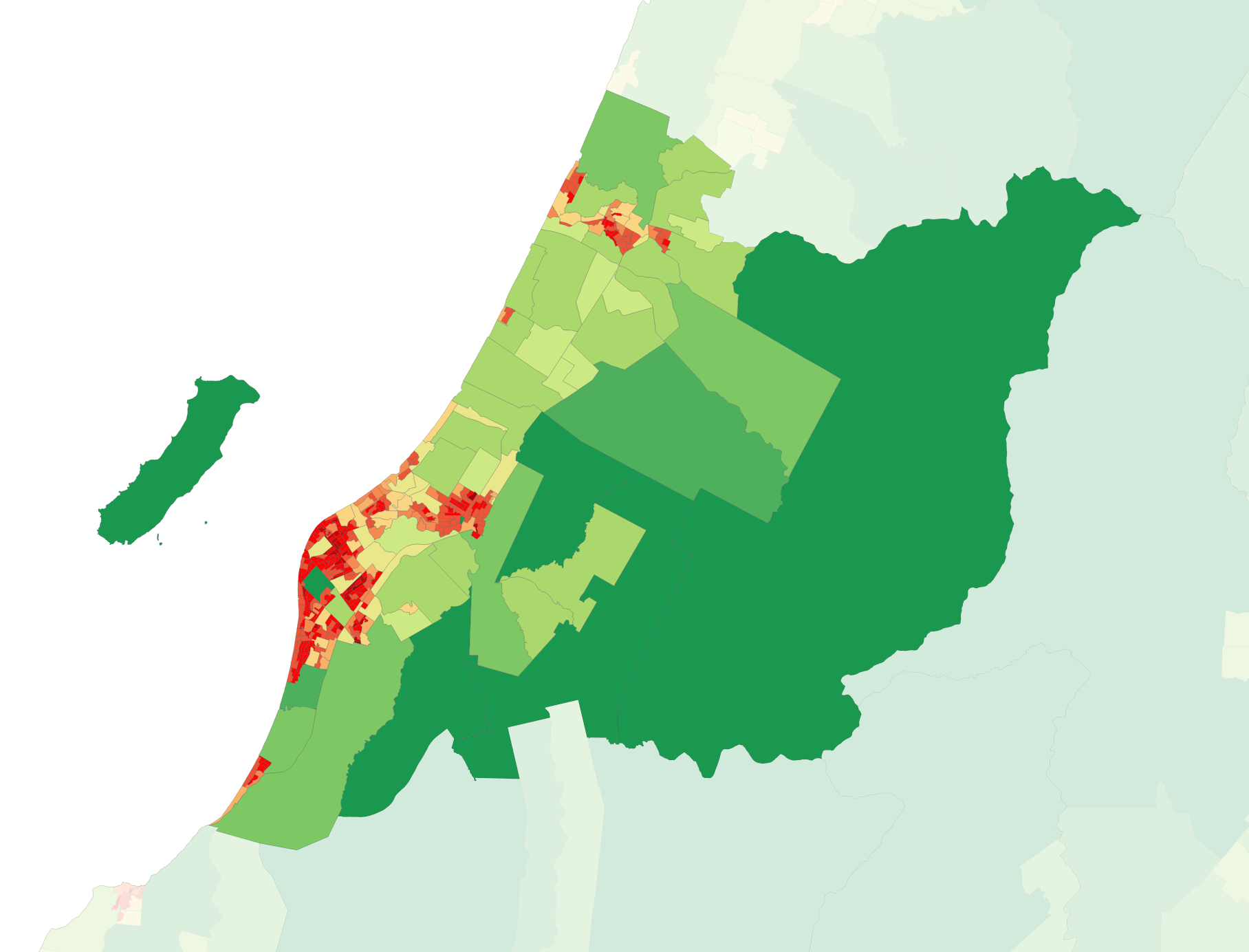
Population density in the 2023 census

Individual wards
Name	Area (km^{2})	Population	Density (per km^{2})	Dwellings	Median age	Median income
Ōtaki Ward	433.31	9,066	21	3,720	45.7 years	$35,900
Paraparaumu Ward	110.40	23,298	211	9,465	47.3 years	$39,000
Waikanae Ward	169.81	15,405	91	6,696	54.3 years	$38,600
Paekākāriki-Raumati Ward	18.00	8,142	452	3,213	45.2 years	$45,600
New Zealand					38.1 years	$41,500

Many of the residents work in Wellington.

The population of the district has grown rapidly since the 1980s, fuelled in large part by Wellingtonians moving there to retire.

=== Populated places ===
Kāpiti Coast District consists of the following towns, localities, settlements and communities:

- Ōtaki Ward:
  - Ōtaki
  - Ōtaki Beach
  - Te Horo
  - Te Horo Beach
  - Hautere
  - Forest Lakes
  - Marycrest
  - Ōtaki North
- Paekākāriki-Raumati Ward:
  - Paekākāriki Area:
    - Paekākāriki
    - Queen Elizabeth Park
    - Moonshine Valley
    - Mackay
    - Emerald Green
    - Whareroa
  - Raumati Area:
    - Raumati Beach
    - Raumati South
    - Whareroa
- Paraparaumu Ward:
  - Paraparaumu
  - Paraparaumu Beach
  - Maungakōtukutuku
  - Otaihanga
  - Nikau Valley
  - Tūteremoana
- Waikanae Ward:
  - Waikanae
  - Reikorangi
  - Waikanae Beach
  - Peka Peka
  - Waikanae Downs

== Economy and transport ==
The Kāpiti Coast District had a modelled gross domestic product (GDP) of $1,985 million in the year to March 2024, 0.5% of New Zealand's national GDP. The GDP per capita was $33,832, the lowest of all territorial authorities.

The Kāpiti Coast is well known for its cheeses and other products from Lindale. Light industry is focused in Paraparaumu and Ōtaki, with small clusters in Waikanae and Raumati.

Many of the Kāpiti Coast's residents are not employed in the area. Instead, they commute to jobs in Wellington. Transdev operates electric commuter trains along a portion of the North Island Main Trunk Railway referred to as the Kāpiti Line on behalf of Metlink (the Greater Wellington public transport brand), and the KiwiRail Capital Connection commuter train from Palmerston North to Wellington provides a service for commuters north of the electric terminus in Waikanae. The district is on the North Island Main Trunk railway line (NIMT) and served as far north as Waikanae by suburban passenger trains on the Kāpiti Line, one of Wellington's three Metlink commuter rail links. Metlink also provides regular local bus services throughout the Kāpiti Coast, operated by Uzabus.

In February 2017, an 18 km (11 mi) long expressway diversion from Mackays Crossing north of Paekākāriki to just north of Peka Peka, was opened to enable State Highway 1 to bypass developed urban areas. An extension to just north of Ōtaki opened in December 2022. State Highway One connects the Kāpiti Coast to Wellington. Before the long-mooted Transmission Gully Motorway opened in March 2022, the road (now re-designated State Highway 59) was a narrow, highly congested coastal highway and has been subject to occasional closure due to landslides.

The small Kapiti Coast Airport is sandwiched between Paraparaumu (to the north) and Raumati (to the south). With three runways (one of which is now closed), it once served as the main airport of the Wellington region, but was until recently used mainly by aeroclubs. In 2011 scheduled commercial flights from Kapiti to Auckland resumed. It also has daily scheduled flights across Cook Strait to Nelson and Blenheim. After Air New Zealand withdrew air services in April 2018, Air Chathams announced that they would be launching flights to Auckland from August 2018. Sounds Air also operates from the airport, and it is used for flight training and for private and hobby flights.

== Attractions ==
Attractions in the Kāpiti Coast region include:

- Kapiti Island is an iconic landmark, providing a symbol for a number of local businesses and groups. The island has several walks and trails, and contains species of protected native birdlife. Access to the nature reserve is by approved tour groups only.
- The Kapiti Coast Museum in Waikanae has a wide range of historic collections including object and clothing displays, archives, hands-on exhibits, a reconstruction of a historic Kāpiti Coast domestic layout, plus military and 19th century communications equipment.
- Ngā Manu Nature Reserve, a 14 hectares (35 acres) reserve located north of the Waikanae that preserves the largest remnant of coastal lowland swamp forest on the Kāpiti Coast
- Ōtaki-Māori Racing Club is New Zealand's only Māori racing club; it was formed in 1886, and holds eight race meetings annually.
- Ōtaki Museum houses documents, photographs, oral histories and artifacts of significance to the history of Ōtaki and the surrounding district.
- Queen Elizabeth Park contains the Wellington Tramway Museum and a number of coastal walking tracks. It also hosts orienteering events.
- Paekakariki Station Museum has displays of local Māori and heritage items, along with sections devoted to railways and the US Marines occupation of the McKays Crossing area during World War II. It is located in the historic Paekakariki Railway Station building.
- Steam Incorporated, a railway preservation society, is based in the Paekakariki Railway Yard. Steam Inc.'s depot, known as "The Engine Shed", where locomotives and rolling stock are restored and displayed, and the society is also one of the few operators of steam-hauled excursions on New Zealand's national railway network.
- One of the Southern Hemisphere's largest car collections is at the Southward Car Museum in Otaihanga.
- Paekakariki Escarpment Walkway is a walking track that goes between Paekākāriki and Pukerua Bay railway station. It is part of Te Araroa walkway that traverses New Zealand from north to south.
- Pharazyn Reserve, an environmental restoration project; the site has been described as one of the top 10 birdwatching sites in the Wellington region.
- Paraparaumu Golf Course.

== Film and television ==
Film director Peter Jackson is from Pukerua Bay and went to high school at Kāpiti College in Raumati Beach. Scenes from his movies Lord of the Rings and King Kong were filmed on the Kāpiti Coast. Some of the seminal battle scenes in the fields in front of Minas Tirith in The Lord of the Rings: The Return of the King were shot in part at Queen Elizabeth Park. Kapiti Island figured in King Kong, with the scenes approaching the lost island of King Kong shot in the waters between Raumati Beach and the island.

== Sport ==
Rugby union clubs based in the area include Paraparaumu RFC, Waikanae RFC, Rahui RFC, and Toa RFC. Horowhenua Kapiti represent the district in the Heartland Championship.

Kapiti has been represented in rugby league by the Kapiti Bears – Kapiti Coast Rugby League Club Inc., which was founded in the 1970s and was the home of Kiwi and Melbourne Storm player Stephen Kearney. The Kapiti Bears operate out of Matthews Park, Menin Road, and are affiliated with the Wellington Rugby League Association.

In association football, Kapiti is represented by Kapiti Coast United, who play at Weka Park in Raumati Beach. The club was formed by the merger of Raumati Hearts and Paraparaumu United in 2003.

Paraparaumu Track and Field Club is the athletics club based in Paraparaumu, with facilities at the Paraparaumu Domain.

== News media ==
Three news media are based in the district.

- Kapiti News – a newspaper owned by Horowhenua Chronicle (previously NZME)
- BeachFM – local owned radio station broadcasting on 106.3 FM
- What's On Kapiti – online news source publishing about Kapiti

=== Defunct ===
- Kapiti Observer – free newspaper delivered to homes and run by Stuff Closed in 2024.

== See also ==
- List of historic places in the Kāpiti Coast District
