= Raumati South =

Settlement in Wellington Region, New Zealand

- Town
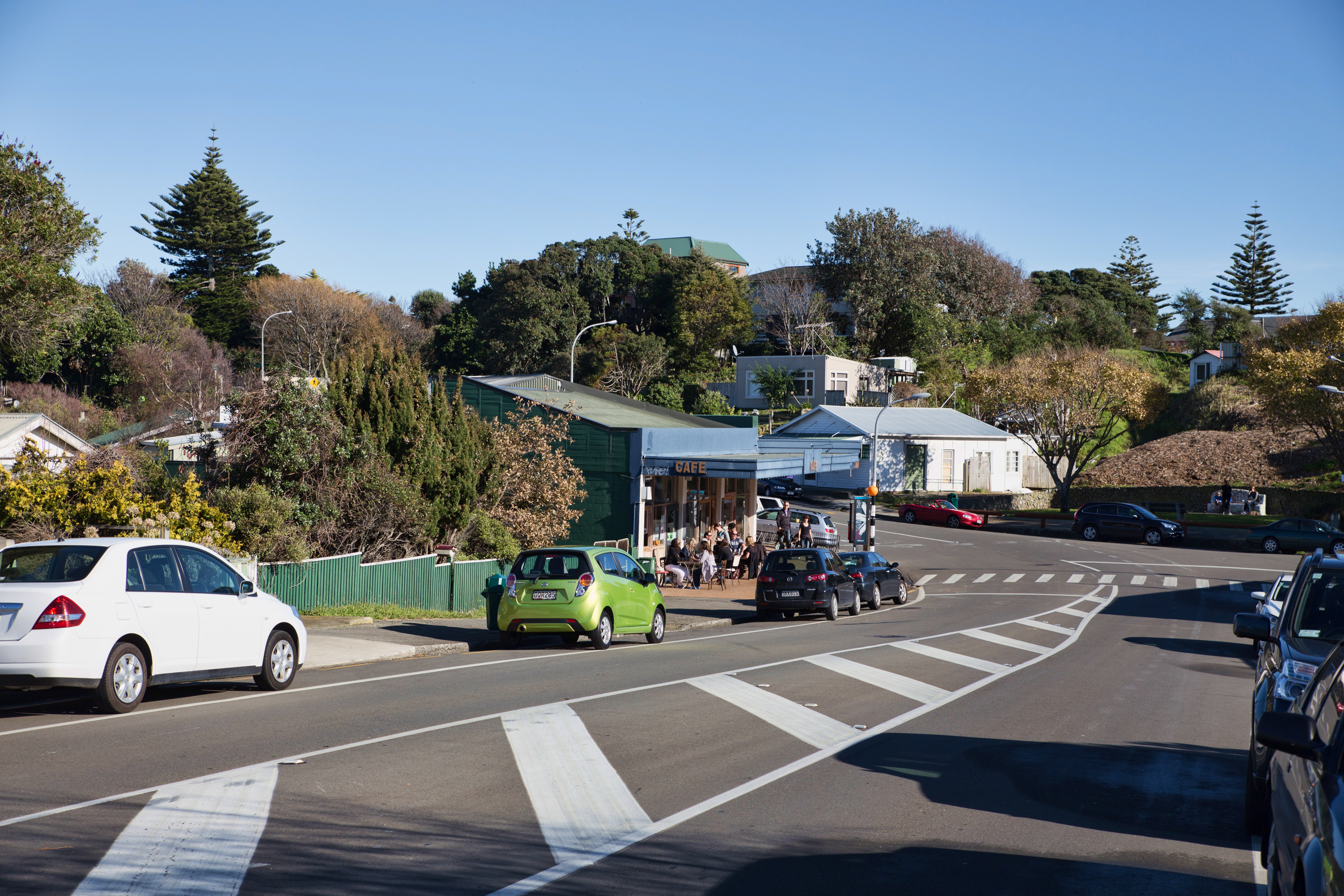
- Raumati South village
- Interactive map of Raumati South
- Coordinates: 40.936271°S 174.977409°E
- Country: New Zealand
- Region: Wellington Region
- Territorial authority: Kāpiti Coast District
- Ward: Paekākāriki-Raumati Ward
- Community: Raumati Community
- Electorates: Kapiti; Te Tai Hauāuru (Māori)

Government
  - Territorial Authority: Kāpiti Coast District Council
  - Regional council: Greater Wellington Regional Council
  - Kāpiti Coast Mayor: Janet Holborow
  - Kapiti MP: Tim Costley
  - Te Tai Hauāuru MP: Debbie Ngarewa-Packer

Area
  - Total: 5.42 km^{2} (2.09 sq mi)

Population (June 2025)
  - Total: 3,830
  - Density: 707/km^{2} (1,830/sq mi)
- Postcode(s): 5032
- Area code: 04

Raumati South is a coastal community on the Kāpiti Coast of New Zealand's North Island. It is 50 km north-west of Wellington, and immediately south of Raumati Beach and south-west of Paraparaumu. The Maungakotukutuku area is located inland.

"Raumati" is the Māori language word for "summer".

In 1912, Herbert and William Eatwell had named the place Kawatiri, but the name was changed to the current one in 1934 because of another place with the same name in the Tasman Region.

To the south of the town, between it and the town of Paekākāriki, is the Queen Elizabeth Park, a 638 hectare regional park used during the filming of The Lord of the Rings: The Return of the King, where it represented Pelennor Fields. Raumati South is known for the large number of its residents pursuing alternative lifestyles and artistic endeavors. The main primary education provider is Raumati South Primary School. There is also a Steiner school called 'Te Rā' located on Poplar Avenue.

== Demographics ==
Raumati South statistical area covers 5.42 km^{2} (2.09 sq mi). It had an estimated population of 3,830 as of June 2025, with a population density of 706.64 people per km^{2}.

Historical population
| Year | Pop. | ±% p.a. |
|---|---|---|
| 2006 | 3,546 | — |
| 2013 | 3,594 | +0.19% |
| 2018 | 3,753 | +0.87% |
| 2023 | 3,780 | +0.14% |
The 2006 population is for a larger area of 5.65 km^{2}. Source:

Raumati South had a population of 3,780 in the 2023 New Zealand census, an increase of 27 people (0.7%) since the 2018 census, and an increase of 186 people (5.2%) since the 2013 census. There were 1,857 males, 1,893 females, and 33 people of other genders in 1,440 dwellings. 4.5% of people identified as LGBTIQ+. The median age was 44.7 years (compared with 38.1 years nationally). There were 747 people (19.8%) aged under 15 years, 504 (13.3%) aged 15 to 29, 1,884 (49.8%) aged 30 to 64, and 645 (17.1%) aged 65 or older.

People could identify as more than one ethnicity. The results were 90.2% European (Pākehā); 11.7% Māori; 2.9% Pasifika; 6.0% Asian; 1.4% Middle Eastern, Latin American and African New Zealanders (MELAA); and 2.4% other, which includes people giving their ethnicity as "New Zealander". English was spoken by 97.9%, Māori by 3.0%, Samoan by 0.4%, and other languages by 11.7%. No language could be spoken by 1.5% (e.g. too young to talk). New Zealand Sign Language was known by 0.7%. The percentage of people born overseas was 26.7, compared with 28.8% nationally.

Religious affiliations were 24.4% Christian, 0.6% Hindu, 0.3% Islam, 0.2% Māori religious beliefs, 0.6% Buddhist, 0.8% New Age, 0.1% Jewish, and 1.3% other religions. People who answered that they had no religion were 65.8%, and 6.1% of people did not answer the census question.

Of those at least 15 years old, 1,020 (33.6%) people had a bachelor's or higher degree, 1,518 (50.0%) had a post-high school certificate or diploma, and 495 (16.3%) people exclusively held high school qualifications. The median income was $46,900, compared with $41,500 nationally. 573 people (18.9%) earned over $100,000 compared to 12.1% nationally. The employment status of those at least 15 was 1,521 (50.1%) full-time, 543 (17.9%) part-time, and 66 (2.2%) unemployed.

The demographics for Raumati South are also incorporated in Paraparaumu#Demographics.

== Sports and parks ==
Tennis courts were built by Bert Eatwell in Raumati South (then Kawatiri) in about 1930. The first tennis club in Raumati South was established in the mid-1940s. A bowling club was established in Raumati South in 1945 but is no longer operating. A surf club was established in Raumati South in 1955.

== Education ==
Raumati South School is a state primary school for Year 1 to 8 students, with a roll of 357. It opened in 1970.

Te Rā School is a state-integrated primary school for Year 1 to 8 students, with a roll of 141. It opened at Paekākāriki as Te Rā Waldorf School in 1996 and moved to the current site in stages from 1998.

Both schools are co-educational. Rolls are as of July 2026.
