= Ōtaki Health Camp =

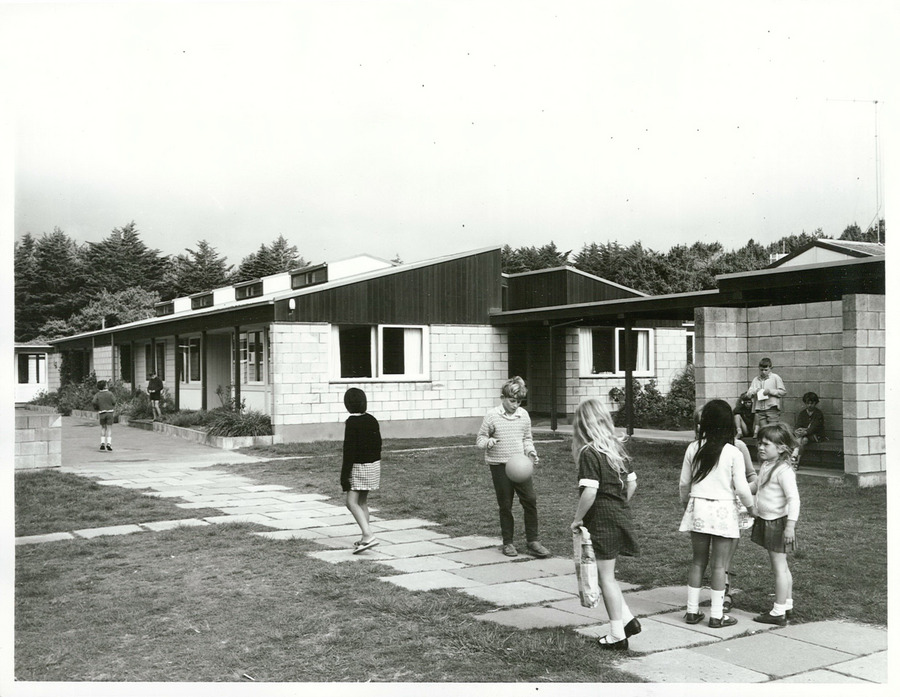
- Children's Health Camp (1972)

Location
- 29 Health Camp Road, Otaki Beach 5512

Information
- Established: 1932
- Closed: 2018

Ōtaki Health Camp was New Zealand's first permanent health camp established in 1932. The camp was based in the North Island town of Ōtaki, New Zealand, the camp closed in June 2018. Temporary health camps were organised during World War I and through the 1930s under the guidance of Elizabeth Gunn. These camps were part of the wider health system's attempts to tackle malnutrition. Children would bathe, make their beds, have lessons, swim and exercise, and have sunbathing sessions. Children were served several portions of healthy, simple food to ensure they returned home in a healthier state than when they arrived.

== History ==
The Ōtaki Health Camp was opened in 1932 by a Wellington children's charity, with support from the government. Entrepreneur and landowner, Byron Brown, gave the land for the children's camp and the first camp buildings went up and remain there today. Its aim was to enhance the health and robustness of urban children. It was sited in Ōtaki so children could benefit from ample sunshine and beach-oriented play. In 1936, a national federation was set up to oversee the operation of all the camps. Funding was received from the central government and also from the sale of specially issued postage stamps. However, by the 1970s, funding began to dry up, debts mounted and building facilities became outdated. By the mid-1990s, the camps could afford to take only about half of all children eligible for treatment.

== Closure ==
The government stepped away from the camps in 2001, handing them over to a new charitable organisation, STAND Children's Services/Tu Maia Whanau which was contracted to Oranga Tamariki. In 2018, the camp closed due to a lack of funding.

== Gallery ==
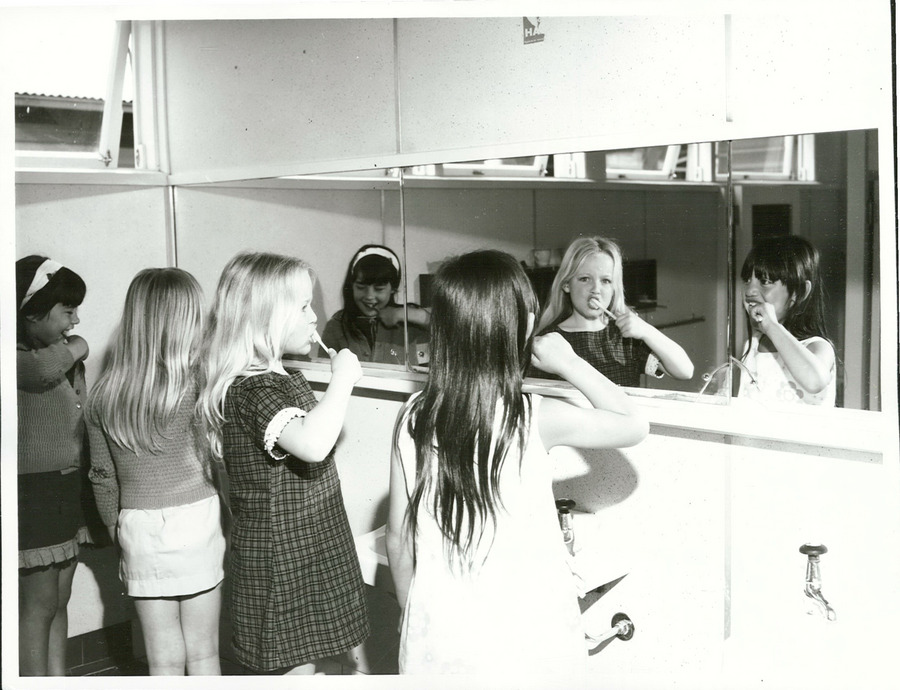
Children cleaning their teeth

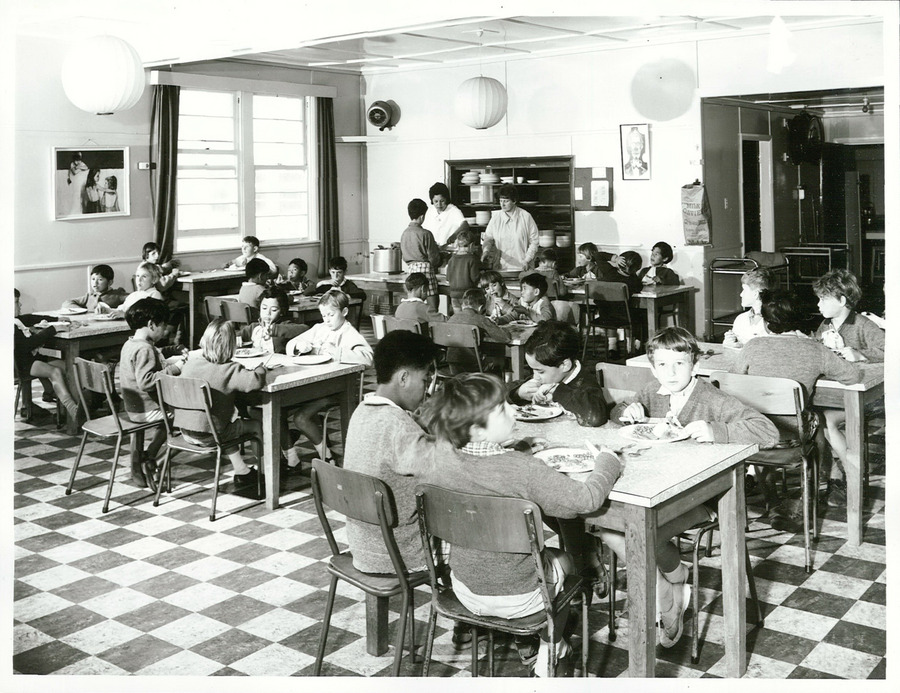
The dining room

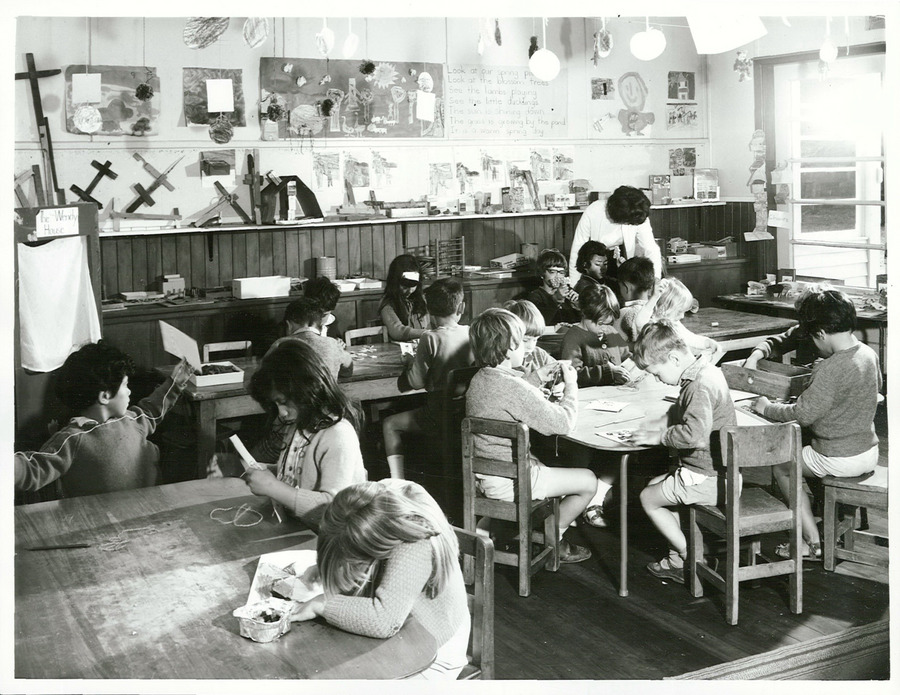
School at the camp
