= Wellington Tramway Museum =

- Established: 19 December 1965
- Location: Queen Elizabeth Park, New Zealand
- Coordinates: 40.969194°S 174.980659°E
- Type: Railway museum
- Website: wellingtontrams.org.nz

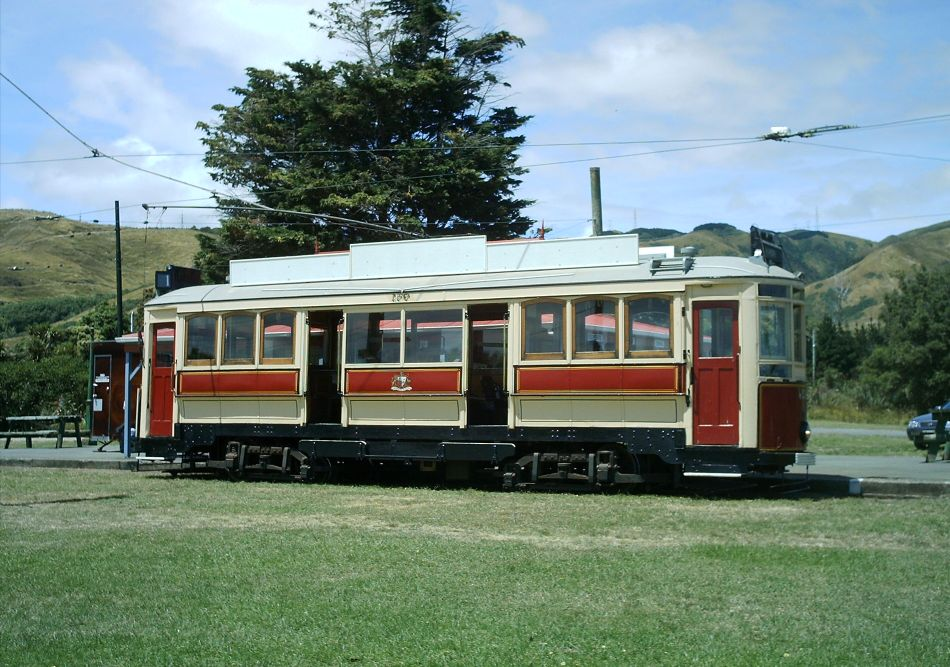
Wellington electric double-saloon tram car 159 at the Wellington Tramway Museum

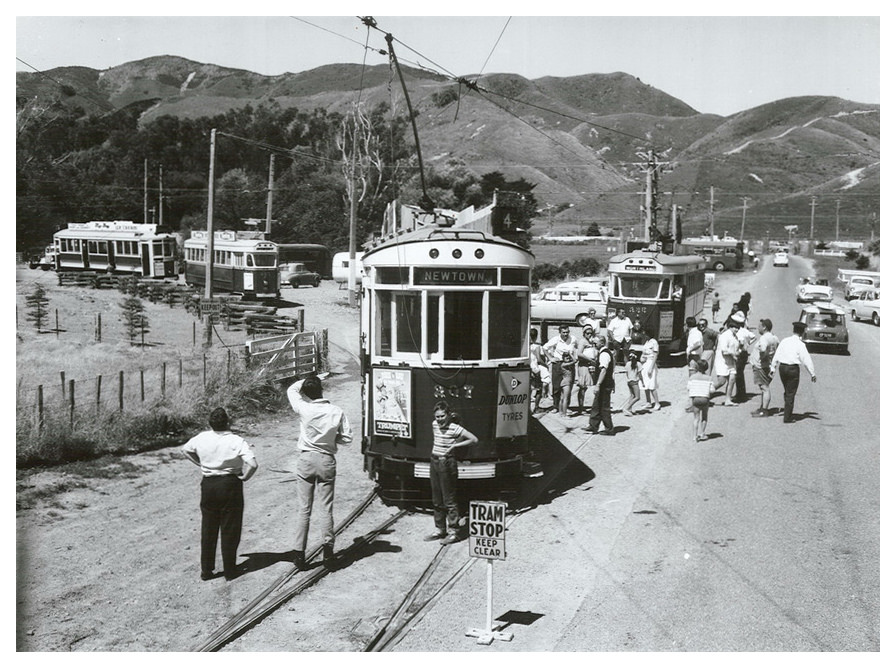
Tram car 207 at the museum in 1967

The Wellington Tramway Museum is located at Queen Elizabeth Park on the lower North Island of New Zealand, near the overbridge at McKay's Crossing between Paekākāriki and Paraparaumu. Trams have been in operation on a line through the park since 1965. The museum is 45 km (28 mi) from Wellington. The trams owned by the museum date back to the 1920s and 1930s and were used on the Wellington tramway system between 1878 and 1964, transporting commuters around the city.

== History ==
The museum maintains nearly 2 km (1.2 mi) of 4-foot (1219mm) gauge track in Queen Elizabeth Park, as well a fleet of trams from the closed Wellington system, several of which are currently operational with further examples in storage or undergoing restoration. The museum also owns an ex-Brisbane tram No.236 which is leased to the Tramway Historical Society of Christchurch, the body and chassis of a New Plymouth Birney tram which is on long-term loan to the Whanganui Tramways Trust, plus a small collection of diesel buses and trolley buses from Wellington and New Plymouth. The museum previously owned ex-Brisbane "Dreadnought" tram No.133 (gifted to the Whanganui Tramways Trust in 2017) and the body and chassis only of ex-Wanganui tram No.8, also gifted to the Whanganui Tramways Trust.

From 1969 to 1974, Saul Goldsmith was president of the Tramway Museum.

== Opening hours ==
The museum is open every Saturday and Sunday from 11am to 4.30pm (last tram 4pm), and on public holidays except for Christmas Day. After Christmas the museum opens daily from Boxing Day (26 December) to Wellington Anniversary Day in late January. The museum also opens with restricted hours throughout some school holidays, these dates being advertised on the museum's website. During open hours tram rides are available in a heritage Wellington electric tram (nearly 4 kilometres return) and visitors are able to inspect the museum exhibits.

== Wellington trams ==
Key:	In Service	Under Overhaul/Restoration	Stored	Static Display	Scrapped

Fleet Number	Type	Builder	Year built	Notes
2	Cable car grip tram	Mark Sinclair, Dunedin	1901	Cable car No 2 was used from 1902 until 1978 on the Wellington cable car. Donated to the WTM in 1978, it runs on 3' 6" (1067mm) gauge track and so cannot run at the museum. On static display in the tram barn.
5	Cable car trailer	Unknown	c.1880s	Cable car trailer No 5 was converted from a Palace-type horse tram to become a cable car trailer. Retired in 1974 due to safety concerns, it was placed on a playground at Kelburn Park next to the modernised cable car. Trailer No 5 moved to the WTM in September 2011 and in June 2018 was moved to the care of The Wheelwright Shop, Gladstone, Wairarapa.
6	Cable car trailer	Unknown	c.1880s	Cable car trailer No 6 was converted from a Palace-type horse tram to become a cable car trailer. Retired in 1974 due to safety concerns, trailer No 6 was donated to the WTM in 1978. It runs on 3' 6" (1067mm) gauge track and so cannot run at the museum. On static display in the tram barn.
17	Combination	British Electric Car Company	1903/4, rebuilt 1911	No 17 is the oldest extant Wellington tram and the only one of the original 1903/04 group of 33 trams to survive. It arrived at McKay's Crossing in 1986 after being used as a bach at Raumati South since the late 1940s. Between January 2014 and June 2018 the body and chassis were restored to a Museum quality standards by The Wheelwright Shop, Gladstone, Wairarapa. In June 2018 it was returned after restoration to the Wellington Tramway Museum and placed on static display in the tram barn. The museum is currently restoring this tram to operational condition. On the 7th of September 2025, tram 17 was put into service for the first time.
82	Palace	Rouse and Hurrell, Wellington	1911, rebuilt 1913	No 82 was the last surviving Palace-type tram in New Zealand. Rebuilt as a double saloon tram in 1913, it survived into the 1950s as an illuminated advertising tram although such duties ended in the late 1940s. The body of No 82 deteriorated and was scrapped with useful parts being saved for future use.
86	Palace	Rouse and Hurrell, Wellington	1911, rebuilt 1913	The body and chassis of this tram was retrieved from Te Marua, north of Upper Hutt, Wellington, in February 2018 and it is now stored at the Wellington Tramway Museum. Until the identity of this tram, which had been encased in a building, was verified in 2017 it had been thought that No.82 (above) was the last Palace-type tram in New Zealand, although like No.82 above it had been rebuilt as a small four-wheeled double-saloon in 1913. No.86 had been withdrawn from service in the late 1920s or early 1930s.
151	Double saloon (Mark I)	Wellington City Council Tramways Department	1923	No 151 was donated to the Tramway Preservation Association, the forerunner of the Wellington Tramway Museum, in 1961 by the Wellington City Council. Used in regular service.
159	Double saloon (Mark I)	Wellington City Council Tramways Department	1925	No 159 donated by Wellington City Council to the Oregon Electric Railway Historical Society, U.S.A., in about 1961 and from the time of the Wellington tramway system's closure in 1964 was held on the Oregon Museum's behalf by the Wellington Tramway Museum. In the 1970s the Oregon Museum determined not to proceed with the development of their narrow gauge operation and donated the tram to the Wellington Tramway Museum. Used in regular service.
185	Double saloon (Mark II)	Wellington City Council Tramways Department	1925	No 185 is the only surviving Mark II Double Saloon tram to have been fitted with heavier electrical wiring for use on the hilly Brooklyn (Route 7) and Wadestown (Route 1) lines. No. 185 was obtained by the museum from a farm in Martinborough (Wairarapa) in 1978 where it had been used for storage. Stored awaiting restoration (body only).
207	Double saloon (Mark II)	Wellington City Council Tramways Department	1929	No 207 was formerly (until No.185 was obtained) the only Mark II Double Saloon tram to have survived. It was purchased from Wellington City Council by the museum on closure of the system in 1964 with funds donated by the Vintage Car Club of Wellington. Currently undergoing restoration.
235	"Fiducia" single saloon	Wellington City Council Tramways Department	1937	Oldest surviving "Fiducia" tram. All five "Fiducia" class trams (235, 238, 239, 250, 260) were purchased by the Wellington Tramway Museum from the Wellington City Council in early 1964 on closure of the system at the then scrap price of twenty-two pounds ten shillings (forty-five dollars) each. No 235 is stored awaiting restoration. In 2023, 235 was dismantled for parts for use on other Fiducia trams.
238	"Fiducia" single saloon	Wellington City Council Tramways Department	1937	No 238 is not in service. It is stored awaiting restoration.
239	"Fiducia" single saloon	Wellington City Council Tramways Department	1937/8	No 239 is currently operational and used in regular service.
244	"Fiducia" single saloon	Wellington City Council Tramways Department	1939	First tram to use the last tramway extension in NZ, namely the Bowen Street deviation in 1940. 244 was gifted to Wellington Tramway Museum in 2021 after being deemed surplus to requirements at MOTAT's tramway.
250	"Fiducia" single saloon	Wellington City Council Tramways Department	1939/40	No 250 was purchased for spare parts. Body broken up for spares, underframe used for a time as a flat wagon for track work. The two trucks (bogies) and motors are now held as spares.
260	"Fiducia" single saloon	Wellington City Council Tramways Department	1952	No 260 was the last "Fiducia" built with some minor detail differences to the earlier cars of this type, and entered service on 19 December 1952. Full re-building and restoration was ongoing since the 1980s and was completed in 2016. Notably No. 260 was the last tram to be built and enter service in a traditional street tramway system in New Zealand. Currently operational and used in regular service.

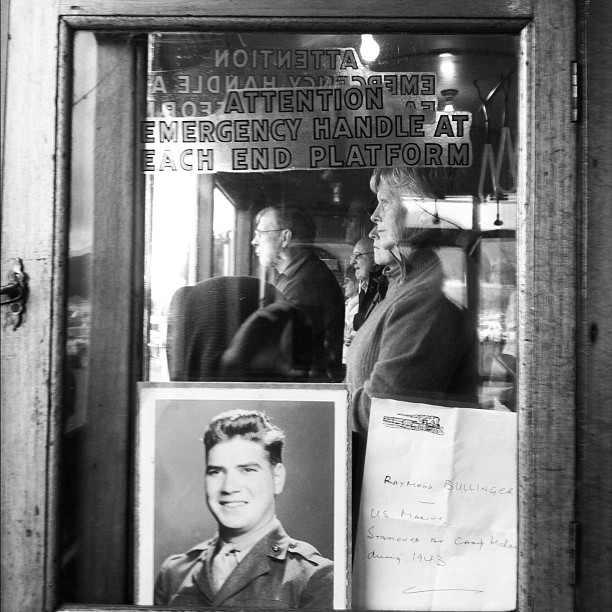
Memorial Day 2012

== Camp Russell and Camp Mackay ==
The museum is on a part of the site of the US Marines' camps there between 1942 and 1944. A ceremony was held on Memorial Day 2012 among the trams very familiar to Marines visiting Wellington.
