= Coastlands Shopping Centre =

Shopping mall in Paraparaumu, New Zealand

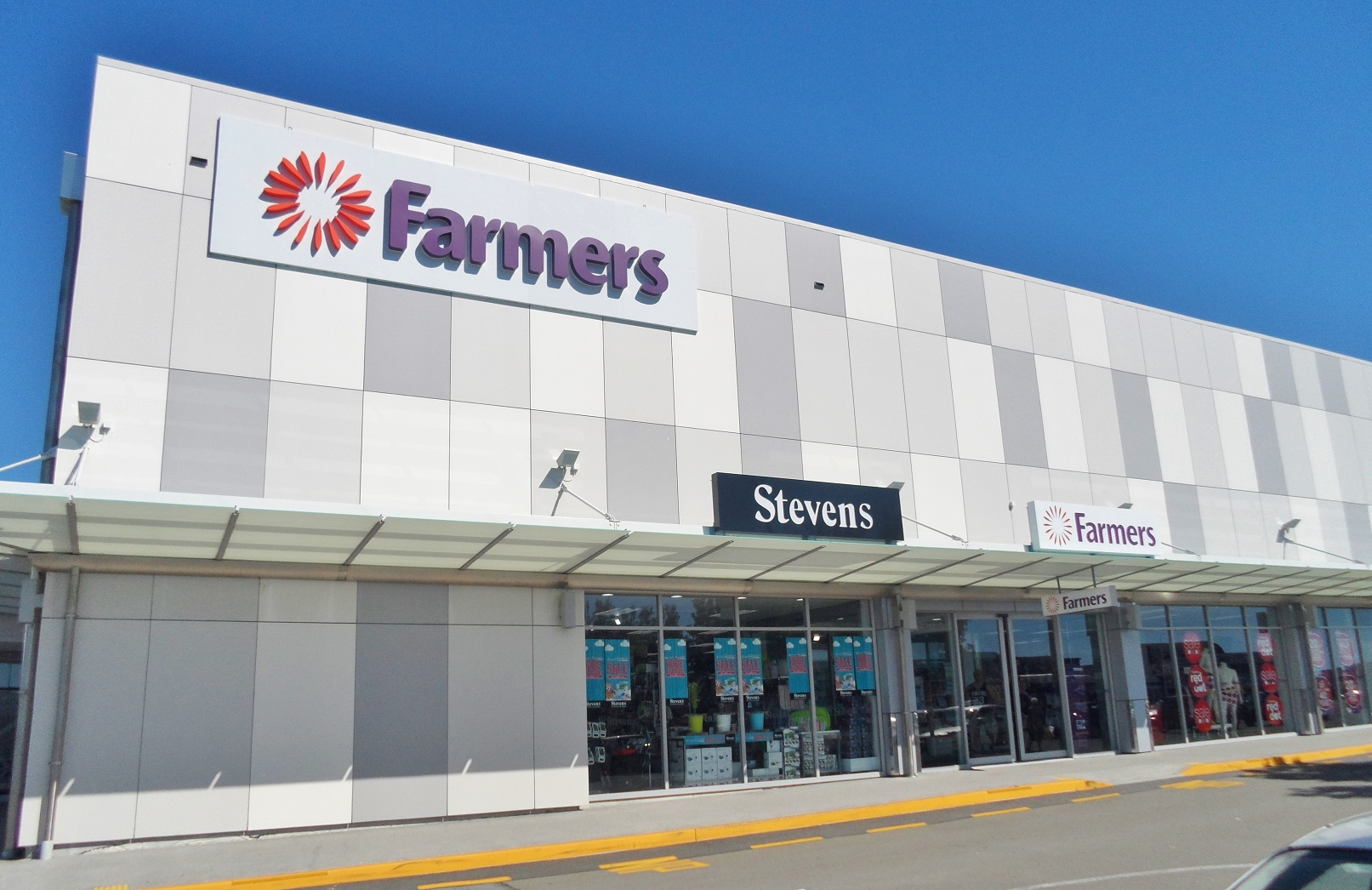
- The Farmers shop at the shopping centre
- Coordinates: 40.917°S 175.005°E
- Address: Coastlands Parade, Paraparaumu
- Opened: 6 November 1969
- Developer: Alpha Corporation
- Num. of stores: 100
- Floor area: 49,000 m^{2} (530,000 sq ft)

Coastlands Shopping Centre or Coastlands Shoppingtown is a shopping mall in Paraparaumu, New Zealand. The shopping centre has naming rights of the Coastlands Aquatic Centre due to making donations to the aquatic centre, which was built by the Kāpiti Coast District Council.

== History ==
Coastlands Shopping Centre first opened on 6 November 1969, originally with 21 shops and a retail space of 6,180 square metres (66,500 sq ft), after the accountant Ray Spackman bought the land, which was a farm at the time, in 1963. According to The Dominion Post, Coastlands and a shopping mall in New Brighton were the first shopping centres in New Zealand to allow trading on Sundays. In 1982 the shopping centre made a deal with the Māori Ngahina Trust so that the land south of the Wharemauku Stream would be half owned by the trust and the shopping centre. That land ended up being called Ngahina Arcade and currently has The Warehouse and Pak'nSave. After Coastlands was bought by another company, Coastlands was bought back in 1988 by Alpha Corporation, the company who developed it, and who still owns Coastlands as of 2013.

In March 2009 work started on adding about 200 car parks, redesigning the food court and adding bathrooms. In 2011 work started on doubling the size of the Farmers shop and renovating bathrooms, and a cinema opened that year. In 2014 a former garden centre building was demolished to make way for the building of a commercial two-storey building, Takiri House, named after Takiri Love, who became one of the first Coastlands shareholders after selling her family's land to the shopping centre in exchange for shares. The director of the shopping centre has said that the building was built due to expectations of growth due to the build of the Kāpiti Expressway. The building opened in 2017, and in 2020 a second Takiri House, that looks the same as the original, started being built after being delayed by the COVID-19 pandemic. In 2015 work started on expanding the food court, to add four new shops and 120 more seats.

According to Coastlands, in the year prior to 2013 the shopping centre had five million visits, employs 1,500 people and had an estimated turnover of $275 million. As of 2019 there are 100 shops and there is a retail space of 49,000 square metres (530,000 sq ft).

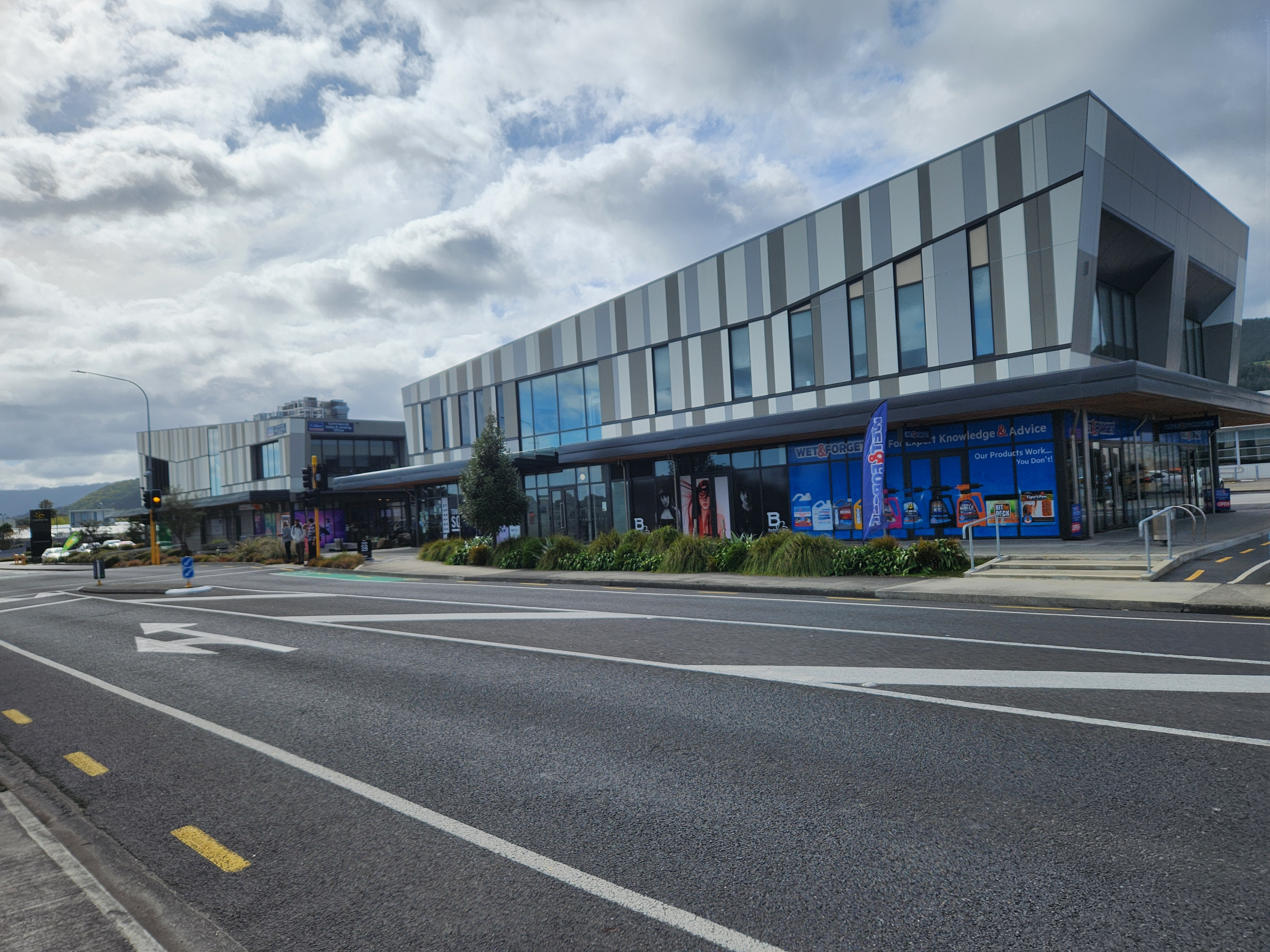
The Takiri House buildings opened in 2017 and 2020.

== Coastlands Aquatic Centre ==
The Coastlands Aquatic Centre was built by the Kāpiti Coast District Council and was sponsored by Coastlands Shopping Centre, which is where the name came from. The main pool has a floor with an adjustable height, which allows the pool to be shallower for children and allows it to become deeper for swimming competitions.

The Coastlands Aquatic Centre was approved by the council in September 2010 with an estimated building cost of $15.7 million. The build of the Coastlands Aquatic Centre was delayed in February 2011 due to the company Mainzeal Property and Construction being put into receivership. The centre was planned on being opened in March. In 2011 the budget increased from the original estimate of $17 million to $21.1 million and the council suggested that they would fund the increase by selling land. (the Kāpiti Coast District Council provided most of the funds) In 2013 the council sold a 5.11 hectare paddock, which was across the street from the shopping centre, to Ngahina Trust, which is a subsidiary of the owner of the shopping centre, for $2.4 million. The council said that it would spend $2.3 million of that on funding the aquatic centre. In June 2013 it was announced that they would be adding a pool ramp for disabled people and with funding of $100,000. The aquatic centre opened in August 2013. In 2016 a skidding wheel created a hole in the main pool, which caused it to be closed for several weeks for repairs.

In November 2011 a statue of the famous emperor penguin Happy Feet, who washed up on Peka Peka beach in 2011, was unveiled at the Coastlands Shopping Centre to fundraise for the construction of the aquatic centre. The statue was later moved to the aquatic centre, and Happy Feet became its mascot.
