= Happy Feet (penguin) =

Individual emperor penguin

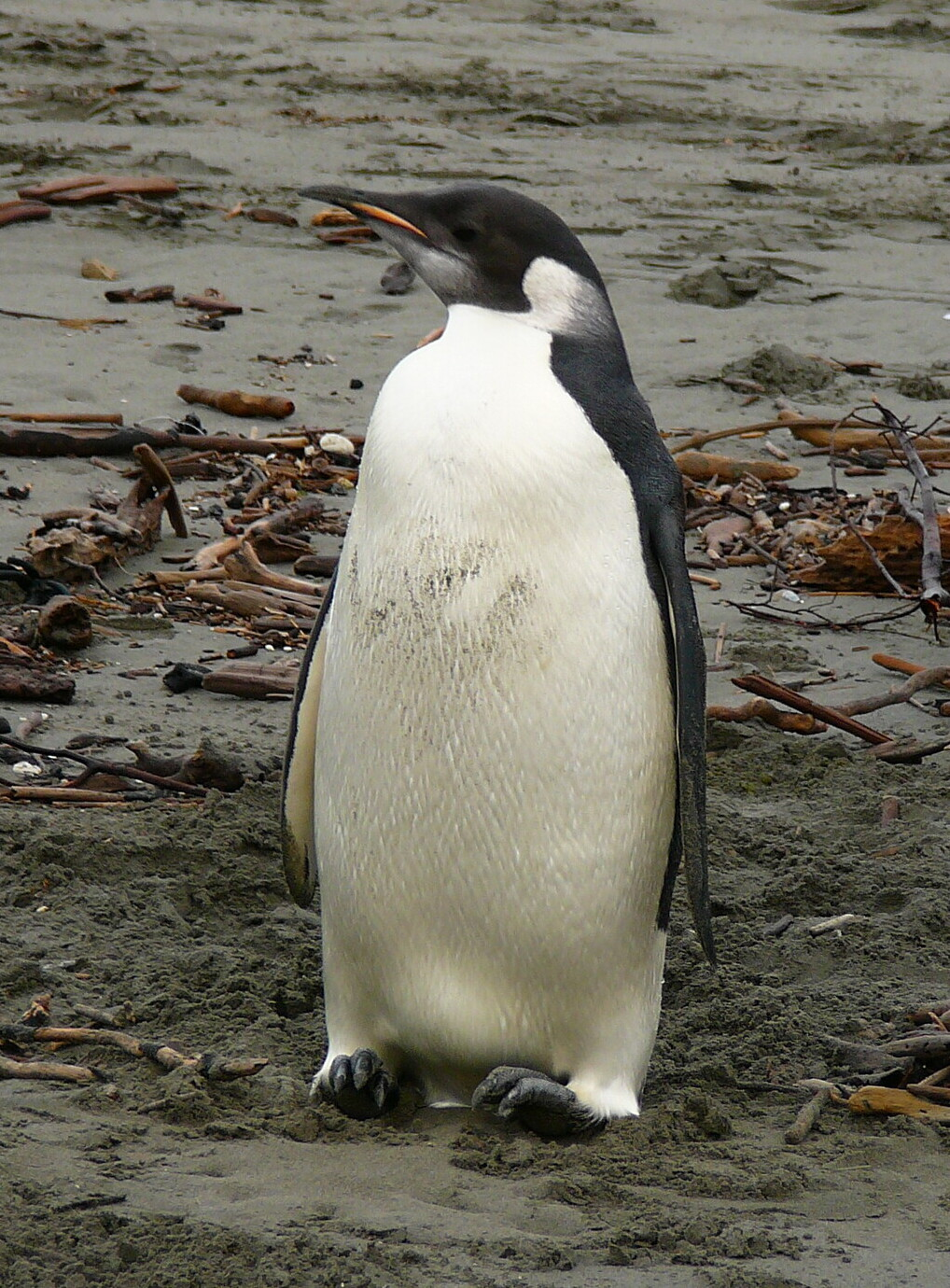
- Happy Feet at Peka Peka Beach on 22 June 2011
- Species: Emperor penguin
- Sex: Male
- Years active: 2011
- Known for: Arriving in New Zealand
- Named after: Happy Feet (2006 film)

An emperor penguin named Happy Feet arrived at Peka Peka Beach in the Kāpiti Coast District of New Zealand's North Island in June 2011 after travelling about 3,200 kilometres (2,000 mi) from Antarctica. He is one of the northernmost emperor penguins ever recorded outside of captivity, and the second emperor penguin to be found in New Zealand. After arriving, he ingested sand on the beach, likely mistaking it for snow, and filled his proventriculus with it. He soon became lethargic, dehydrated and overheated and was transported to Wellington Zoo, where he was given a 50 per cent chance of survival. Most of the sand was removed, and he was kept at the zoo for 10 weeks to recover.

Happy Feet was released in the Southern Ocean on 4 September 2011, about 78 kilometres (48 mi) north of Campbell Island, at the 51st parallel. He was fitted with a satellite transmitter to track his location, but the device ceased transmission on 9 September, possibly due to the transmitter falling off or the penguin being preyed upon.

The arrival of the bird, who was named after the 2006 animated film Happy Feet, which features emperor penguins, was featured in reports by more than 600 media outlets worldwide. The event raised the public's awareness of wildlife, and for some time received more media attention than New Zealand prime minister John Key. Happy Feet was one of Time's runner-ups for the 2011 Animal of the Year. He was also the subject of a children's book written by Christine Wilton, who first sighted the penguin at the beach, and another children's book published by Penguin Books in late 2011.

== Arrival ==
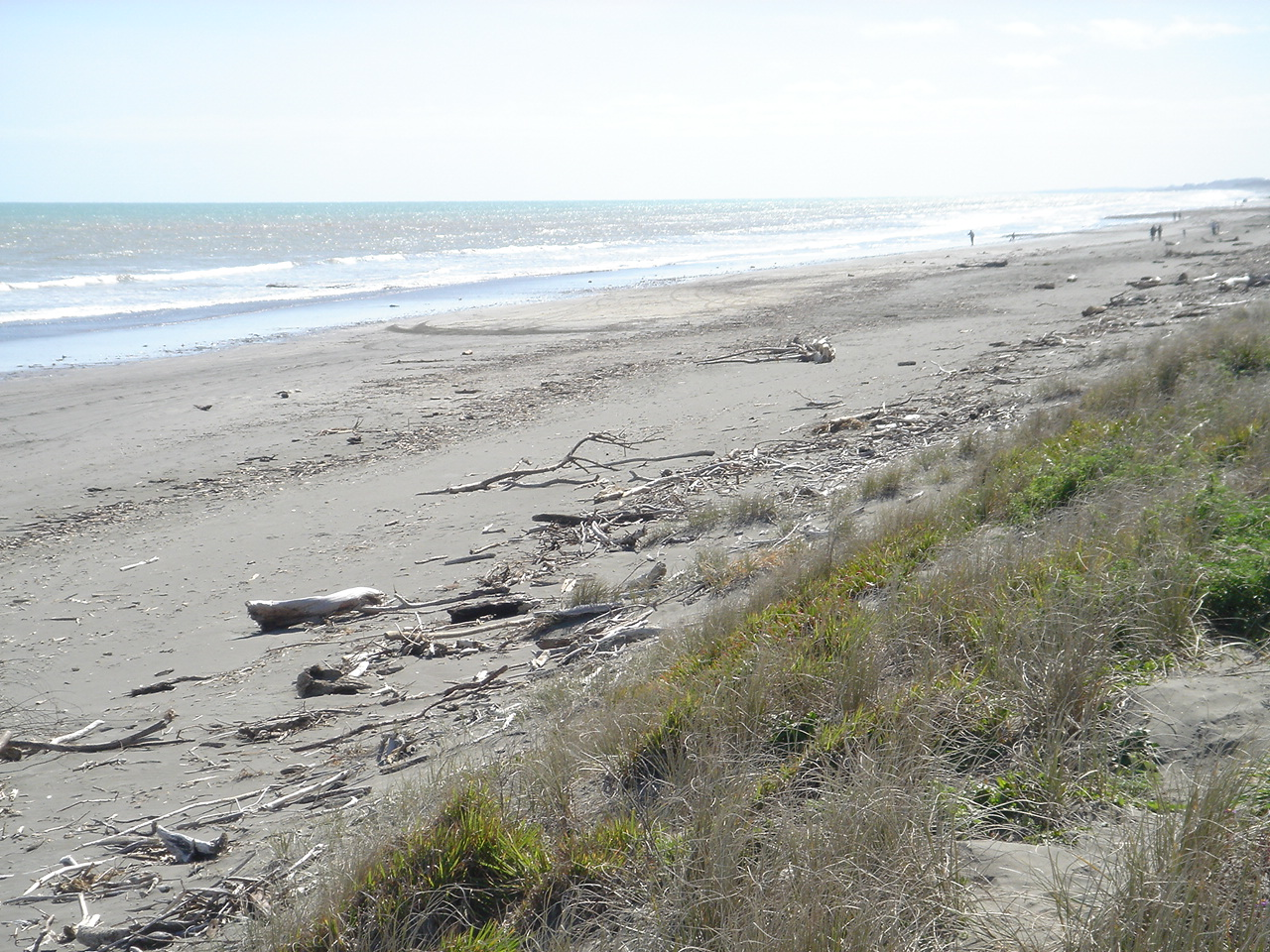
Peka Peka Beach in 2004

Happy Feet was first sighted in the early afternoon of 20 June 2011 at Paraparaumu Beach, in the Kāpiti Coast District of New Zealand's North Island. A few hours later, he was seen again a few kilometres to the north at Peka Peka Beach by Christine Wilton, a Kāpiti resident walking her dog. The bird swam approximately 3,200 kilometres (2,000 mi) from Antarctica to reach New Zealand, arriving just a few kilometres south of the northernmost recorded sighting of an emperor penguin, which occurred in Argentina. The reason for his presence so far from his natural habitat is unknown; however, the veterinarian Lisa Argilla has speculated that he may have been unwell or carried off course by an ocean current. Another theory was that the penguin was wandering, a behaviour which ecologists believe to have evolved as a way to establish new colonies by chance, despite its high likelihood of resulting in death. His arrival marked only the second recorded instance of an emperor penguin in New Zealand, the first having been found in 1967 at Southland's Oreti Beach.

After the dog walker sighted Happy Feet at Peka Peka Beach, she notified the Department of Conservation (DOC) Waikanae office and a ranger subsequently inspected the bird, which initially appeared to be in good health. The penguin was first thought to be approximately three years old, but further analysis suggested that he was about 11 months old at the time of his arrival. He had a height of about 1 metre (3 ft), and was determined to be male two weeks after his arrival, based on DNA testing of a feather sample. The bird was named "Happy Feet" by the woman who first observed him, after the 2006 film Happy Feet, which features emperor penguins.

As thousands of people viewed Happy Feet at the beach, concerns arose about the potential danger the public posed to the penguin. In response, the Kāpiti Coast District Council closed the beach to vehicles and posted security guards, and locals kept watch over the penguin 24 hours a day. A cordon was placed around Happy Feet and it was ensured that he had access to the sea at all times. DOC co-ordinated this protection effort due to the Wildlife Act 1953, which requires the department to protect self-introduced vagrant birds.

At the beach, Happy Feet ingested sand, (Note: Observers stated that the penguin had swallowed large pieces of wood. However, no wood was found during stomach flushing and endoscopy according to a 2012 scientific publication that discussed the measures taken to rehabilitate the penguin. Newspapers instead reported that he had swallowed sticks and netting, and that these items were removed during stomach flushing.) probably mistaking it for snow, which emperor penguins naturally consume to hydrate and cool themselves. Experts initially chose not to intervene because they did not know whether the bird would regurgitate the sand on his own, and because he appeared to be in a good state of health. However, by the morning of 24 June, Happy Feet was lethargic, dehydrated, had difficulty swallowing and occasionally attempted to expel sand. He was also suffering from heat stress, as the air temperature of about 10 °C (50 °F) was warmer than what emperor penguins are accustomed to. Because of this, at noon on the same day, DOC and Te Papa museum staff placed Happy Feet into an ice-filled plastic tub and transported him to Wellington Zoo's animal hospital The Nest Te Kōhanga.

== Healthcare ==
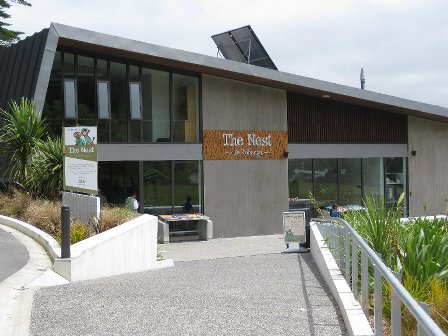
The animal hospital Nest Te Kōhanga at Wellington Zoo in 2010

After Happy Feet arrived at the zoo, veterinarians anaesthetised him and took X-rays, revealing that his oesophagus and proventriculus (stomach) were full of sand. A stomach rupture was considered possible, and he was given a 50 per cent chance of survival. He was put on an intravenous drip due to dehydration, and had water pumped down his throat to flush out most of the sand from his oesophagus, but it still remained in his proventriculus. Overnight, Happy Feet excreted some sand, indicating that a portion had moved through his digestive system. To encourage him to expel the material, he was given oily foods and laxatives.

On 27 June, veterinarians flushed sand out of Happy Feet's proventriculus, using an endoscope to view the contents, a method also used in subsequent procedures. This was conducted in front of about 100 spectators, who observed through a window. The following day, about half of the sand was removed, and on 2 July, a fourth and final procedure was performed to flush out additional stomach contents. On the same day, X-rays taken to confirm that all the sand had been removed revealed small stones in the penguin's proventriculus. (Note: Emperor penguins have been known to swallow stones since at least the 19th century, but the reasons for them doing so are unknown.) In total, about 2 kilograms (4.4 lb) of sand was removed.

At the zoo, Happy Feet's enclosure was kept at 8 °C (46 °F) and was fitted with a bed of ice to mimic his natural environment. The penguin was provided access to an outdoor saltwater pool, which he swam in when air temperatures were sufficiently low. He was in Wellington for 10 weeks.

== Release ==
External video
- Happy Feet being released into the sea
- https://teara.govt.nz/en/video/46520/happy-feet-departs

During Happy Feet's recovery, an advisory committee, including experts from Wellington Zoo, DOC, Te Papa and Massey University, determined whether the penguin was to be released or kept in captivity. Arguments against release included the potential stress it could cause him, the likelihood that he would be unable to locate the colony he came from, and the risk of introducing disease to Antarctic colonies, as he might have contracted one during his journey to New Zealand. Releasing him in Antarctica would have been illegal without a permit under the Antarctic Treaty, which requires precautions to prevent the introduction of microorganisms, including viruses.

In contrast, economist Gareth Morgan offered to transport the penguin to Antarctica aboard a Russian icebreaker ship as part of the "Our Far South" expedition, which he had organised. The vessel was scheduled to travel to Scott Base in the Ross Sea in early 2012. Addressing concerns about disease transmission, John Cockrem, a penguin expert from Massey University, believed that if Happy Feet were released in sub-Antarctic waters and made his way to Antarctica independently, any disease would disappear naturally, although the journey could prove fatal.

Keeping him in captivity also posed challenges. New Zealand lacked the facilities to replicate the climatic conditions required for an emperor penguin. While suitable facilities existed in California—including SeaWorld San Diego, which offered to take the bird—transporting him there would likely cause him significant stress. Another concern was that New Zealand did not house any other emperor penguins; if, for example, he were moved to the International Antarctic Centre in Christchurch, he would be isolated. Some media outlets also suggested euthanising him or releasing him back on Peka Peka Beach.

On 29 June, the committee unanimously decided that once Happy Feet had recovered, he would be released into the Southern Ocean, where juvenile emperor penguins are typically found. Prior to his departure, a microchip transponder was inserted under the skin of his right thigh and a satellite transmitter was glued and fastened with cable ties to the feathers of his lower back, allowing his location to be tracked. The device was designed to detach during his next moult. On the day before he left the zoo, a "Haere Ra Happy Feet" farewell party was held, which was attended by more than 1,700 people.

The location where Happy Feet was released

Happy Feet left Wellington Zoo on 29 August aboard NIWA's research vessel Tangaroa, which was conducting a fisheries survey around Campbell Island. Over the next five days the ship travelled 1,200 kilometres (750 mi) south-southwest from Wellington, arriving on 4 September at the release point, about 78 kilometres (48 mi) north of the island. The penguin was released that morning at 10:30 am, via a makeshift slide at the stern of the ship. An alternative release method—placing him into the sea from a smaller boat—was ruled out due to rough sea conditions.

== Disappearance ==
After Happy Feet left the ship, his location was tracked via the satellite transmitter, with data shared on a public website. It reported that within five days the penguin had covered 113 kilometres (70 mi), generally heading southeast, towards the Marie Byrd Land region of Antarctica. However, the transmitter signal was lost at 8 am New Zealand Standard Time on 9 September 2011, much earlier than expected, indicating that the device had not surfaced since then. The most likely explanations are that the transmitter had fallen off—possibly caused by the penguin pecking at it (Note: Emperor penguins have been observed pecking at transmitters attached to them.)—or that the penguin had been preyed upon. On 13 September, Cockrem stated that it was "highly likely" that Happy Feet was still alive, as he had not travelled far enough south to encounter predators such as leopard seals, and believed that the tracker had simply fallen off. During a parliamentary question time in October 2011, Green MP Gareth Hughes asked the Minister of Fisheries and Aquaculture, Phil Heatley, whether a trawler might have killed Happy Feet. Heatley dismissed this possibility, stating that the tracker data indicated that the penguin had not approached any trawlers closely enough.

Before Morgan's "Our Far South" expedition began in early 2012, Morgan said the team would attempt to locate Happy Feet using the chip implanted in him. This would have involved approaching a colony and searching for the chip with a radio transmitter, but Happy Feet was heading towards the rarely visited Marie Byrd Land, where some colonies have never been visited.

== Cost ==
More than $30,000 had been spent on Happy Feet by September 2011. While DOC did not disclose the costs relating to the penguin during his time at the beach, Wellington Zoo reported raising $29,000 by the time of his departure, covering the costs of his care and release. The zoo recorded a 50 per cent increase in visitors in the month of July 2011 compared to July 2010, which it attributed to both Happy Feet's presence and the opening of new exhibits.

Several businesses supported fundraising efforts. The snack manufacturer Bluebird Foods, which had long featured penguins in its advertising, contributed to the cause and estimated that it would raise about $20,000 before beginning its campaign. Morgan also launched a fundraising campaign to support the penguin's care, matching each dollar donated. Surplus funds from all fundraising efforts were directed to other initiatives, such as Places for Penguins, run by Wellington Zoo and Forest & Bird.

Happy Feet's recovery occurred during a period of public funding cuts to DOC. The department's expenditure on his rehabilitation contributed to the media coverage he received, which in turn helped raise public awareness of birds and wildlife in New Zealand. However, The Dominion Post suggested that the funds could have been more effectively used to restore a wetland or forest remnant, which would help several birds rather than just one. Kevin Hackwell of Forest & Bird stated that Wellington Zoo would have faced criticism regardless of whether it assisted Happy Feet.

== Media coverage and recognition ==
Happy Feet's arrival at Peka Peka Beach received worldwide media coverage, with over 600 media outlets reporting on the story. He raised public awareness of wildlife, and for some time received more media attention than New Zealand Prime Minister John Key. The penguin received significantly more attention than the only other recorded emperor penguin to swim to New Zealand, who arrived in 1967.

In November 2011, a resin statue of Happy Feet was unveiled at the Coastlands Shopping Centre in Paraparaumu. It was later relocated to the nearby Coastlands Aquatic Centre, where it became the centre's mascot. Sarah Holleman, a Wellington Zoo veterinary nurse who helped care for the penguin, assisted in making the statue. That same year, Christine Wilton—who discovered the penguin on the beach and reported him to DOC—wrote a children's book about him, and Penguin Books also published a children's book about Happy Feet. In December 2011, Time magazine named Happy Feet as a runner-up Animal of the Year, behind Cairo, the dog who helped with the killing of Osama bin Laden.

== See also ==
- Gus (penguin), who arrived in Australia in 2024

== Works cited ==
- Miskelly, Colin; Simpson, Peter; Argilla, Lisa; Cockrem, John (January 2012). "Discovery, rehabilitation, and post-release monitoring of a vagrant emperor penguin (Aptenodytes forsteri)" (PDF). Notornis. 59 (3–4): 116. doi:10.63172//743319atwwwx. OCLC 837311158.
