= Paraparaumu Beach =

Settlement in Wellington Region, New Zealand

- Town
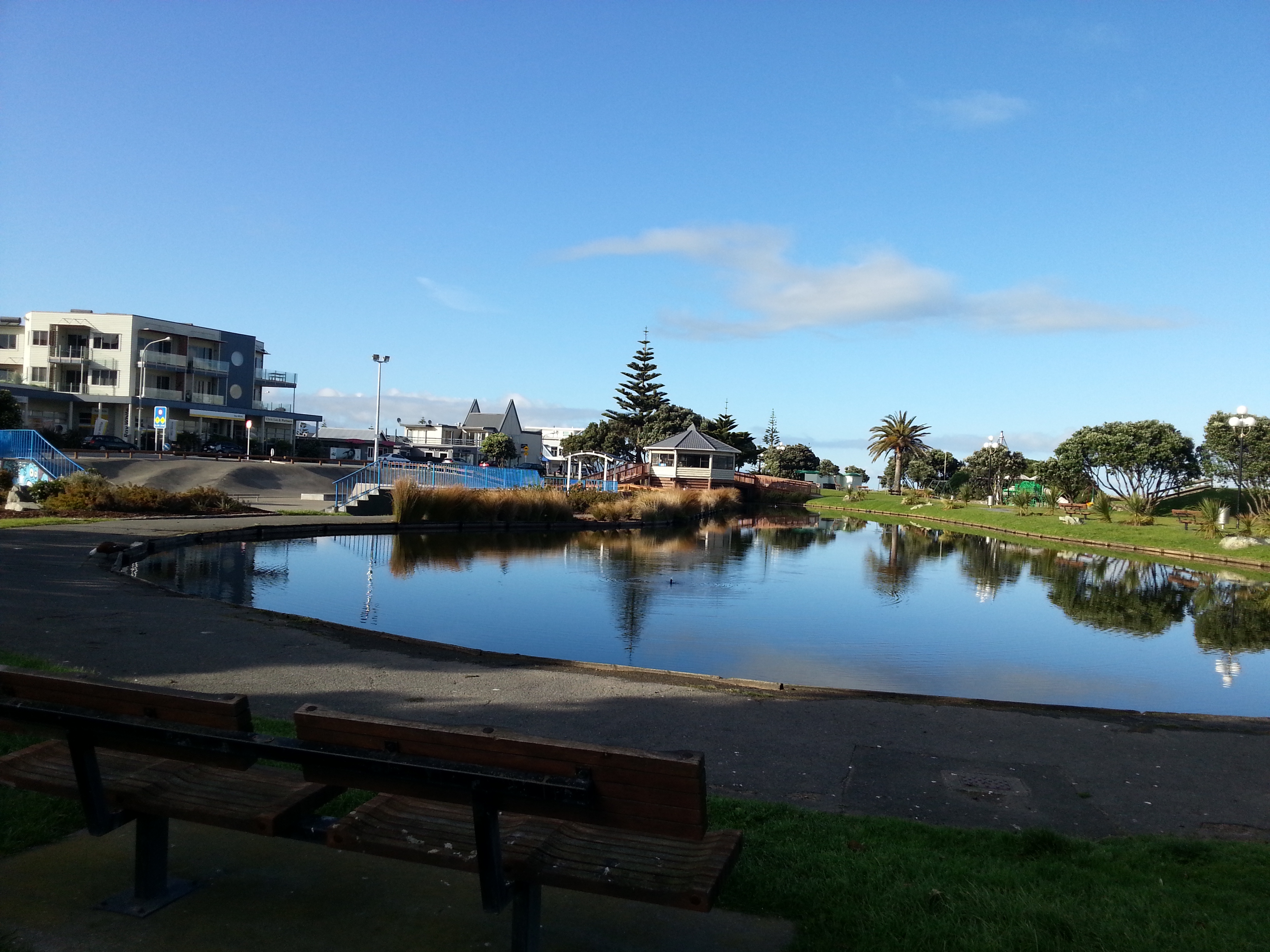
- Paraparaumu Beach in 2013
- Interactive map of Paraparaumu Beach
- Coordinates: 40.893777°S 174.979437°E
- Country: New Zealand
- Region: Wellington Region
- Territorial authority: Kāpiti Coast District
- Ward: Paraparaumu Ward
- Community: Paraparaumu Community
- Electorates: Kapiti; Te Tai Hauāuru (Māori)

Government
  - Territorial Authority: Kāpiti Coast District Council
  - Regional council: Greater Wellington Regional Council
  - Kāpiti Coast Mayor: Janet Holborow
  - Kapiti MP: Tim Costley
  - Te Tai Hauāuru MP: Debbie Ngarewa-Packer

Area
  - Total: 5.12 km^{2} (1.98 sq mi)

Population (June 2025)
  - Total: 9,390
  - Density: 1,830/km^{2} (4,750/sq mi)
- Postcode(s): 5032
- Area code: 04

Paraparaumu Beach is a coastal settlement on the Kāpiti Coast of New Zealand's North Island. It is located west of the main Paraparaumu township, 50 km (31 mi) north of Wellington. The area faces Kapiti Island.

== Demographics ==
Paraparaumu Beach covers 5.12 km^{2} (1.98 sq mi) and had an estimated population of 9,390 as of June 2025, with a population density of 1,834 people per km^{2}.

Historical population
Year	Pop.	±% p.a.
2006	8,010	—
2013	8,583	+0.99%
2018	9,090	+1.15%
2023	9,213	+0.27%
The 2006 population is for a smaller area of 4.80 km^{2}. Source:

Paraparaumu Beach had a population of 9,213 in the 2023 New Zealand census, an increase of 123 people (1.4%) since the 2018 census, and an increase of 630 people (7.3%) since the 2013 census. There were 4,410 males, 4,779 females, and 27 people of other genders in 3,765 dwellings. 3.1% of people identified as LGBTIQ+. The median age was 47.9 years (compared with 38.1 years nationally). There were 1,488 people (16.2%) aged under 15 years, 1,290 (14.0%) aged 15 to 29, 4,041 (43.9%) aged 30 to 64, and 2,394 (26.0%) aged 65 or older.

People could identify as more than one ethnicity. The results were 88.0% European (Pākehā); 12.8% Māori; 3.8% Pasifika; 6.5% Asian; 1.2% Middle Eastern, Latin American and African New Zealanders (MELAA); and 2.7% other, which includes people giving their ethnicity as "New Zealander". English was spoken by 97.5%, Māori by 2.1%, Samoan by 0.6%, and other languages by 10.6%. No language could be spoken by 1.7% (e.g. too young to talk). New Zealand Sign Language was known by 0.6%. The percentage of people born overseas was 24.3, compared with 28.8% nationally.

Religious affiliations were 32.1% Christian, 1.1% Hindu, 0.2% Islam, 0.4% Māori religious beliefs, 0.7% Buddhist, 0.6% New Age, 0.1% Jewish, and 1.3% other religions. People who answered that they had no religion were 57.1%, and 6.6% of people did not answer the census question.

Of those at least 15 years old, 1,869 (24.2%) people had a bachelor's or higher degree, 4,227 (54.7%) had a post-high school certificate or diploma, and 1,632 (21.1%) people exclusively held high school qualifications. The median income was $40,100, compared with $41,500 nationally. 1,095 people (14.2%) earned over $100,000 compared to 12.1% nationally. The employment status of those at least 15 was 3,564 (46.1%) full-time, 1,041 (13.5%) part-time, and 186 (2.4%) unemployed.

Individual statistical areas
Name	Area (km^{2})	Population	Density (per km^{2})	Dwellings	Median age	Median income
Paraparaumu Beach North	2.46	4,119	1,674	1,563	44.1 years	$42,900
Paraparaumu Beach West	1.59	2,424	1,525	1,086	53.0 years	$38,400
Paraparaumu Beach East	1.07	2,673	2,498	1,119	50.3 years	$38,400
New Zealand					38.1 years	$41,500

The demographics for Paraparaumu Beach are also incorporated in Paraparaumu#Demographics.

== Attractions ==
Attractions include a studio and gallery of artist Shona Moller and Paraparaumu Beach Golf Club, as well as newly refurbished MacLean Park area, the Saturday Market on MacLean Street, the shops around the area, and the Kapiti Boating Club.

Especially after World War II, the Paraparaumu Beach shops were a popular weekend destination. At the time, shops had restrictions preventing them from opening in the weekends, but places such Paraparaumu Beach were allowed to open.

== Education ==
Paraparaumu Beach School is a state primary school for Year 1 to 8 students, with a roll of 468. It had an official opening in 1966.

Kenakena School is a state primary school for Year 1 to 8 students, with a roll of 522. It started as a side-school of Paraparaumu Beach School, and became a separate school in 1978.

Paraparaumu College is a state secondary school for Year 9 to 13 students, with a roll of 1,488. It opened in 1977.

All these schools are co-educational. Rolls are as of July 2026.
