= Gus (penguin) =

First emperor penguin found in Australia

- Gus being sent back to Antarctica after recovery.
- Species: Aptenodytes forsteri
- Known for: Being the first emperor penguin spotted in the Australian continent
- Named after: Roman emperor Gaius Julius Caesar Augustus

Gus was an emperor penguin (Aptenodytes forsteri) who made international headlines in 2024 as the first of his species recorded in Australia. Gus's journey of over 3,500 kilometers (2,200 miles) from Antarctica to Ocean Beach, Western Australia, captured the attention of scientists, wildlife enthusiasts, and the general public. Despite extensive speculation, the actual reasons behind Gus's exceptionally long swim remain unknown.

== Discovery and rescue ==
On November 1, 2024, Gus was found by local surfers on Ocean Beach in the town of Denmark, located in temperate southwest Australia. Initially mistaken for a large seabird, Gus surprised onlookers by waddling ashore. Weighing only 21.3 kilograms (47 pounds) and appearing malnourished, the penguin was far below the healthy weight range for an adult male emperor penguin, which can exceed 45 kilograms (100 pounds).

Gus was taken into the care of Carol Biddulph, a registered wildlife rehabilitator, who named him after the Roman emperor Augustus. Biddulph and her husband, a veterinarian, provided specialized care, including fluids, a slurry diet, and whole fish, to help Gus recover. During his rehabilitation, Gus gained over 3 kilograms (7 pounds) and reached 24.7 kilograms (54 pounds) by the time of his release. A mirror was placed in his enclosure to simulate companionship, as emperor penguins are highly social animals.

== Release ==
After 20 days of intensive care, Gus was deemed fit for release. On November 20, 2024, he was transported by the Western Australia Department of Biodiversity, Conservation and Attractions off the Southern coast of Australia. He was released from a boat a few hours south of the coast of Albany. The release was timed to coincide with the approaching Southern Hemisphere summer, which is crucial for emperor penguins to thermoregulate.

== Significance ==
Gus's presence in Australia marked the first recorded instance of an emperor penguin reaching the continent. While emperor penguins are known for long foraging trips of up to 1,600 kilometers (1,000 miles), Gus's extraordinary journey was more than twice that distance. Experts speculated that he may have been searching for food and drifted off course, potentially carried by ocean currents. However, no definitive explanation exists for why Gus ended up so far from his natural habitat, making his appearance a subject of mystery for researchers.

== Conservation context ==
The case of Gus brought attention to the challenges facing emperor penguins in the context of climate change. These penguins rely on stable sea ice for breeding and feeding, but warming oceans and erratic ice patterns pose threats to their survival. According to the World Wildlife Foundation, three-quarters of emperor penguin breeding colonies are vulnerable to fluctuating sea ice conditions. A 2021 study estimated that about 98 percent of emperor penguin colonies will go quasi-extinct by 2100 if greenhouse gas emissions are not reduced.

== See also ==
- Happy Feet (penguin), who arrived in New Zealand in 2011
