= Te Horo =

Settlement in Wellington Region, New Zealand

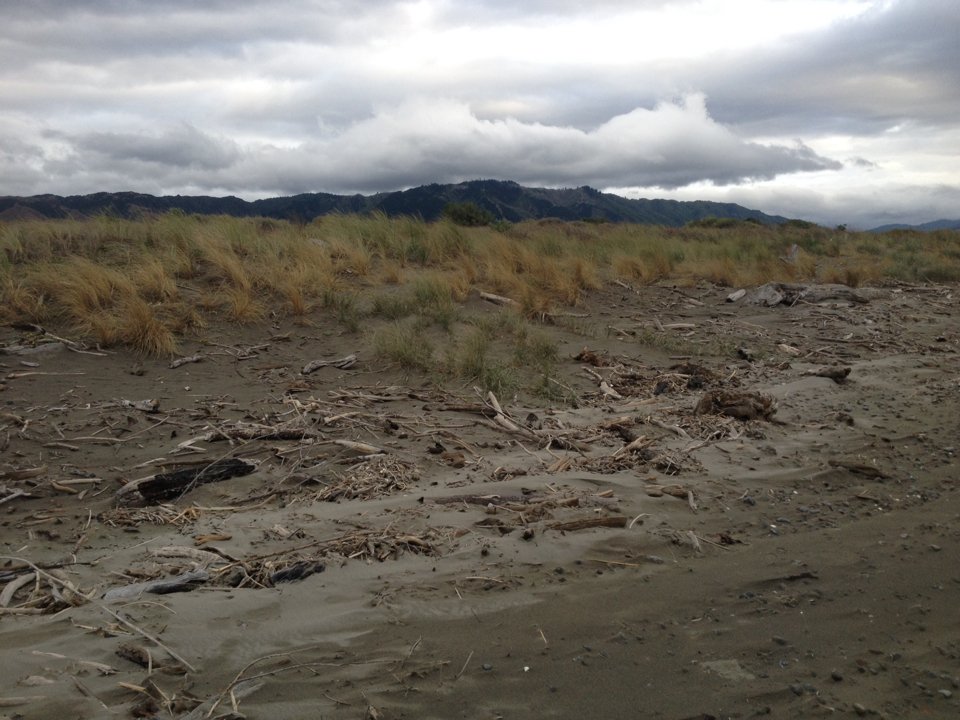
- Te Horo Beach
- Interactive map of Te Horo
- Coordinates: 40°48′S 175°06′E
- Country: New Zealand
- Region: Wellington Region
- Territorial authority: Kāpiti Coast District
- Ward: Waikanae Ward
- Community: Waikanae Community
- Electorates: Kapiti; Te Tai Hauāuru (Māori)

Government
  - Territorial Authority: Kāpiti Coast District Council
  - Regional council: Greater Wellington Regional Council
  - Kāpiti Coast Mayor: Janet Holborow
  - Kapiti MP: Tim Costley
  - Te Tai Hauāuru MP: Debbie Ngarewa-Packer

Area
  - Total: 31.86 km^{2} (12.30 sq mi)

Population (June 2025)
  - Total: 1,600
  - Density: 50/km^{2} (130/sq mi)
- Postal code: 5581

Te Horo and Te Horo Beach are two localities on the Kāpiti Coast of New Zealand's North Island. Te Horo Beach is the larger of the two settlements and, as its name implies, is located on the Tasman Sea coast. Te Horo is located to the east, a short distance inland. They are situated between Peka Peka and Waikanae to the south and Ōtaki to the north. "Te Horo" in the Māori language means "the landslide".

== Demographics ==
=== Te Horo Beach ===
Te Horo Beach is described by Stats NZ as a rural settlement, which covers 0.36 km^{2} (0.14 sq mi). It had an estimated population of 390 as of June 2025, with a population density of 1,083 people per km^{2}. It is part of the larger Te Horo statistical area.

Historical population for Te Horo Beach
Year	Pop.	±% p.a.
2006	225	—
2013	282	+3.28%
2018	339	+3.75%
2023	369	+1.71%
The 2006 population is for a smaller area of 0.33 km^{2}. Source:

Te Horo Beach had a population of 369 in the 2023 New Zealand census, an increase of 30 people (8.8%) since the 2018 census, and an increase of 87 people (30.9%) since the 2013 census. There were 189 males and 183 females in 156 dwellings. 4.1% of people identified as LGBTIQ+. The median age was 46.1 years (compared with 38.1 years nationally). There were 57 people (15.4%) aged under 15 years, 42 (11.4%) aged 15 to 29, 201 (54.5%) aged 30 to 64, and 69 (18.7%) aged 65 or older.

People could identify as more than one ethnicity. The results were 97.6% European (Pākehā); 11.4% Māori; 1.6% Pasifika; 0.8% Asian; 1.6% Middle Eastern, Latin American and African New Zealanders (MELAA); and 2.4% other, which includes people giving their ethnicity as "New Zealander". English was spoken by 97.6%, Māori by 2.4%, and other languages by 8.1%. No language could be spoken by 2.4% (e.g. too young to talk). New Zealand Sign Language was known by 0.8%. The percentage of people born overseas was 22.0, compared with 28.8% nationally.

Religious affiliations were 26.0% Christian, 0.8% New Age, 0.8% Jewish, and 4.1% other religions. People who answered that they had no religion were 64.2%, and 4.9% of people did not answer the census question.

Of those at least 15 years old, 78 (25.0%) people had a bachelor's or higher degree, 177 (56.7%) had a post-high school certificate or diploma, and 60 (19.2%) people exclusively held high school qualifications. The median income was $41,100, compared with $41,500 nationally. 57 people (18.3%) earned over $100,000 compared to 12.1% nationally. The employment status of those at least 15 was 168 (53.8%) full-time, 45 (14.4%) part-time, and 3 (1.0%) unemployed.

=== Te Horo statistical area ===
The statistical area of Te Horo covers 31.86 km^{2} (12.30 sq mi), and includes both Te Horo Beach and Te Horo town. It had an estimated population of 1,600 as of June 2025, with a population density of 50.22 people per km^{2}.

Historical population for Te Horo statistical area
Year	Pop.	±% p.a.
2006	1,116	—
2013	1,287	+2.06%
2018	1,422	+2.02%
2023	1,560	+1.87%

Te Horo had a population of 1,560 in the 2023 New Zealand census, an increase of 138 people (9.7%) since the 2018 census, and an increase of 273 people (21.2%) since the 2013 census. There were 780 males, 771 females, and 9 people of other genders in 627 dwellings. 4.2% of people identified as LGBTIQ+. The median age was 50.3 years (compared with 38.1 years nationally). There were 246 people (15.8%) aged under 15 years, 192 (12.3%) aged 15 to 29, 780 (50.0%) aged 30 to 64, and 342 (21.9%) aged 65 or older.

People could identify as more than one ethnicity. The results were 93.3% European (Pākehā); 14.2% Māori; 2.3% Pasifika; 1.7% Asian; 0.8% Middle Eastern, Latin American and African New Zealanders (MELAA); and 2.3% other, which includes people giving their ethnicity as "New Zealander". English was spoken by 97.5%, Māori by 3.3%, Samoan by 0.2%, and other languages by 7.1%. No language could be spoken by 2.1% (e.g. too young to talk). New Zealand Sign Language was known by 0.4%. The percentage of people born overseas was 20.0, compared with 28.8% nationally.

Religious affiliations were 25.8% Christian, 0.2% Hindu, 0.2% Islam, 0.6% Māori religious beliefs, 0.2% Buddhist, 0.6% New Age, 0.2% Jewish, and 1.9% other religions. People who answered that they had no religion were 61.9%, and 8.5% of people did not answer the census question.

Of those at least 15 years old, 333 (25.3%) people had a bachelor's or higher degree, 750 (57.1%) had a post-high school certificate or diploma, and 228 (17.4%) people exclusively held high school qualifications. The median income was $45,000, compared with $41,500 nationally. 246 people (18.7%) earned over $100,000 compared to 12.1% nationally. The employment status of those at least 15 was 681 (51.8%) full-time, 192 (14.6%) part-time, and 18 (1.4%) unemployed.

== Marae ==
The local Katihiku Marae and Tamatehura meeting house is a traditional meeting place of Ngāti Huia, a hapū of Ngāti Raukawa ki te Tonga.

== Economy ==
Some farming takes place around Te Horo, as well as small-scale viticulture. Many residents of Te Horo commute to either Wellington or Palmerston North. The beach is popular for swimming and boating and attracts visitors to the town.

== Transport ==
Te Horo is situated on the North Island's former main highway route and main rail routes, Old state highway 1 and the North Island Main Trunk railway. The railway was built by the Wellington and Manawatu Railway Company (WMR) as part of its Wellington–Manawatu Line that opened on 1 December 1886 with a station in Te Horo. The WMR was incorporated into the New Zealand Railways Department's national network on 8 December 1908. The railway station, opened on 2 August 1886 was closed to passengers on 27 June 1971 and from 2 November 1987 became a crossing loop only.

Te Horo Beach is situated off the Old state highway 1 road that sits alongside the new Ōtaki expressway and is accessible by a local road, Te Horo Beach Road, that leaves the Old state highway at Te Horo.

== Education ==
Te Horo School is a co-educational state primary school for Year 1 to 8 students, with a roll of 203 as of July 2026. It opened in 1893.

Year 9 to 13 students must travel outside of Te Horo for secondary education, to schools in the Kapiti coast such as Ōtaki College.
