= Lisa Argilla =

New Zealand wildlife veterinarian

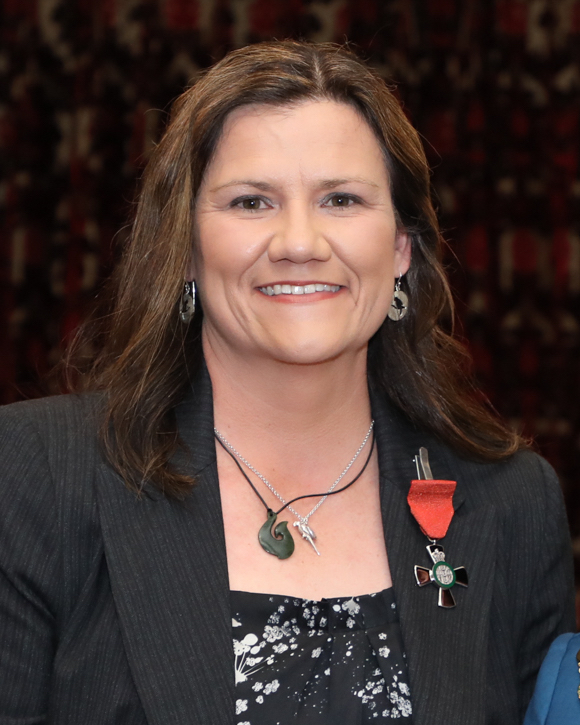
- Argilla in 2021
- Awards: Member of the New Zealand Order of Merit

Academic background
- Education: Massey University
- Academic advisors: Laryssa Howe, Brett Gartrell

Lisa Shelley Argilla MNZM is a South African–New Zealand wildlife veterinarian who leads a wildlife hospital in Dunedin. Argilla is director of the Dunedin Wildlife Hospital. In 2021 Argilla was appointed as a Member of the New Zealand Order of Merit for services to animal welfare and conservation.

== Early life and education ==
Argilla was born in South Africa, and grew up in Durban; she always wanted to be a bird veterinarian. She failed to get a place to study veterinary medicine at the University of Pretoria, so took a degree in animal and wildlife science. She then worked as a zookeeper at a bird park in Durban, before the family emigrated to Australia in 2001. Later moving to New Zealand, Argilla successfully applied to study veterinary medicine at Massey University. Argilla volunteered at wildlife rehabilitation centre Wildbase during her studies, and then returned to Australia to work in private practice. Returning once again to New Zealand, Argilla completed a Master of Veterinary Science degree at Massey University in 2015. Her thesis was titled An investigation of the causes of mortality in yellow-eyed penguins (Megadyptes antipodes) across their range with specific emphasis on the role played by Leucocytozoon.

== Career ==
Argilla was manager of Wellington Zoo's veterinary hospital for five years, where she treated an emperor penguin that became known as Happy Feet. Argilla treated penguins that had been flown up from the South Island, but found she was often euthanising birds for injuries that if treated earlier would have been survivable. In 2016 she began running pop-up clinics in Dunedin in collaboration with the Veterinary Nursing School at Otago Polytechnic, and in 2018, opened the Dunedin Wildlife Hospital. The hospital often treats and hand rears kākāpo, and partners with AgResearch to access equipment such as CAT scanners for diagnosis. In 2022, the hospital achieved a world first in successfully incubating and hatching eggs from the endangered yellow-eyed penguin, the hoiho.

Argilla is president of the New Zealand Veterinary Association’s Wildlife Society.

== Honours and awards ==
In the 2021 New Year's Honours, Argilla was appointed as a Member of the New Zealand Order of Merit for services to animal welfare and conservation.
