= Shona Moller =

New Zealand, artist

Shona Moller is a Wellington, New Zealand, artist based on the Kāpiti Coast. She has been a professional artist since 1999, exhibited London 2003. Her first solo London exhibition opened in 2008 in Bloomsbury. The 2008 London exhibition was a sell out.

Moller has two dedicated spaces in New Zealand, her largest being directly opposite Museum of New Zealand Te Papa Tongarewa. Her Paraparaumu Beach Studio is open to the public and has a small gallery at the front. In 2010 Shona's work was selected as a travelling finalist in the 19th Annual Wallace Art Awards under the nom de plume of Heke Parata. Heke Parata is Shona's great, great, great Grandmother of Ngāi Tahu descent who was kidnapped by Te Rauparaha in 1828 and held hostage on Kapiti Island. This work is now part of the Wallace Collection.
