= Wellington Zoo =

- Te Nukuao Tūroa o Te Whanganui a Tara
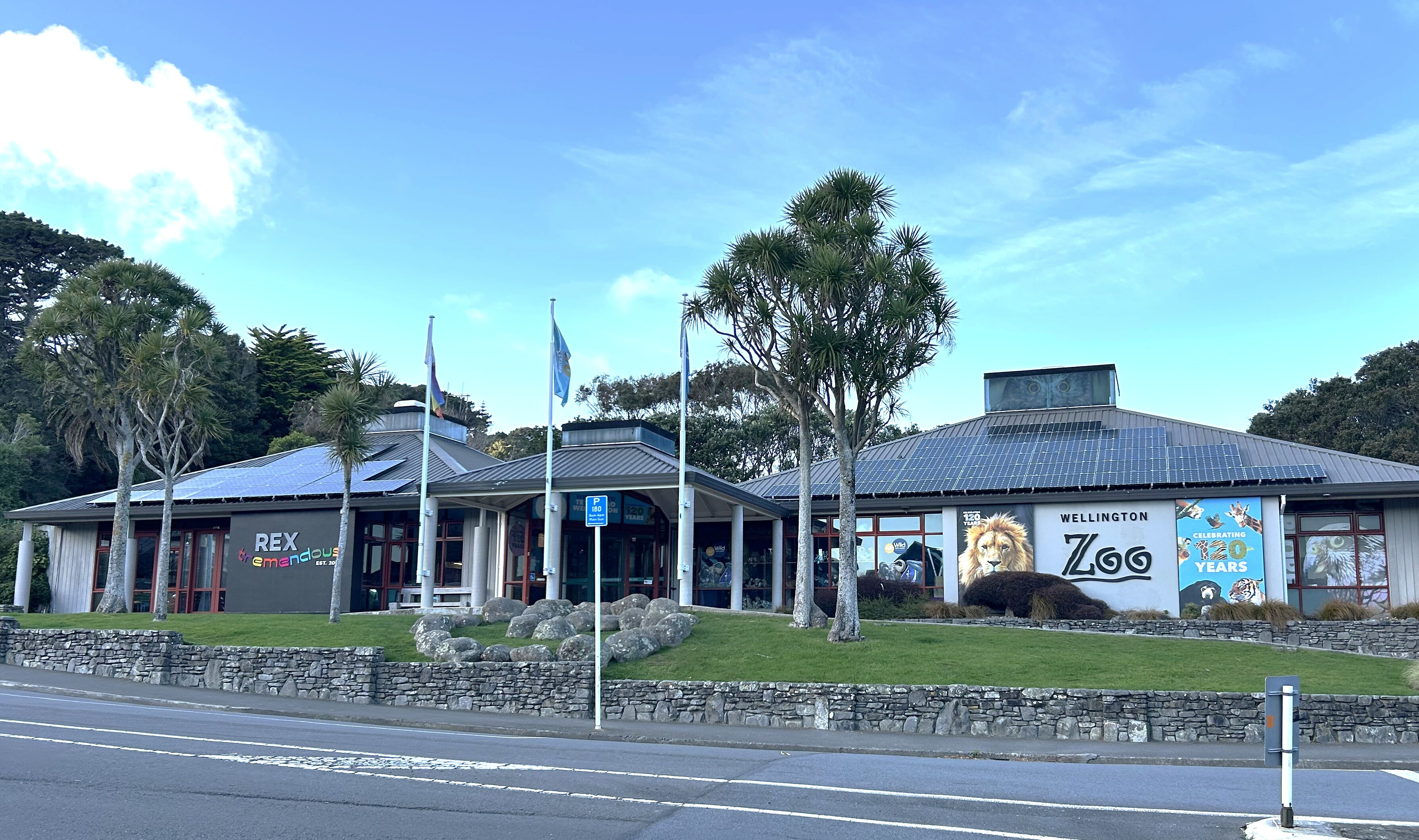
- Interactive map of Wellington Zoo
- 41°19′21″S 174°47′06″E
- Date opened: 1906
- Location: 200 Daniell Street, Newtown, Wellington, New Zealand
- Land area: 13 ha (32 acres)
- No. of animals: 500+
- No. of species: ≈80
- Annual visitors: 220,465 visitors (as of 2025)
- Memberships: ZAA
- Website: wellingtonzoo.com

Wellington Zoo (Māori: Te Nukuao Tūroa o Te Whanganui a Tara) is a 13-hectare (32-acre) zoo on a hilly site in the green belt of Wellington, New Zealand. Wellington Zoo opened in 1906 and is the oldest public zoo in New Zealand. The zoo's name was officially changed to Te Nukuao Tūroa o Te Whanganui a Tara Wellington Zoo Trust on 27 March 2024. The change was made to reflect a continuing commitment towards becoming bicultural.

== Visitor attraction ==
In July 2026, Travel + Leisure listed Wellington Zoo among the 25 best zoos in the world in terms of ethical practices, educational programs, and investment in research projects. In 2025, it was ranked thirteenth in the Seven Corners Travel Insurance global zoo rankings, for its animal encounters. As of 2026, Wellington Zoo offers close encounters with a number of species including giraffes, meerkats, lemurs and big cats, as well as overnight stays for groups.

In the 2024/2025 financial year there were 220,465 visitors to the zoo, a decrease of almost 60,000 compared to the previous year.The decrease was attributed to several severe weather events and an economic downturn.

== Conservation and sustainability ==
The zoo works cooperatively with other zoos around the world through studbook keepers, who are responsible for maintaining relevant data on a particular species within a programme to ensure genetic diversity. Wellington Zoo is a full institutional member of the Zoo and Aquarium Association (ZAA).

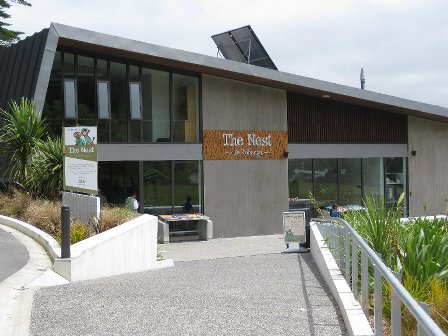
The Nest – Te Kōhanga

In addition to breeding programmes, the zoo is involved in several community conservation projects. The Kererū Discovery Project is a cooperative effort with Zealandia: Karori Wildlife Sanctuary, Te Papa and Pukaha (Mount Bruce). This project aims to make Wellington a better place for kererū, the native New Zealand pigeon. The zoo also collaborates with the Places for Penguins project run by the Royal Forest and Bird Protection Society of New Zealand to identify and protect nesting areas used by kororā (little penguins) around Wellington coastal areas. The zoo has also embarked on the Whitaker's Skink Recovery Programme, an initiative dedicated to breeding and managing Whitaker's skinks. The skinks are considered locally extinct around Wellington, and the zoo currently cares for one sixth of the entire surviving population.

An animal hospital was built in 1935 and enlarged in 1973. A new hospital named The Nest Te Kōhanga opened on 9 December 2009. It treats zoo animals as well as native wildlife brought to the hospital by the SPCA, the Department of Conservation, Zealandia, and members of the local community. The Nest Te Kōhanga has treated over 5,000 native animals. The hospital contains a salt-water pool designed for rehabilitating injured seabirds. The Nest Te Kōhanga enables the public to watch the wildlife vets at work: the vets narrate as they handle check-ups and surgeries and answer questions through an intercom system.

== Funding ==
Historically, the zoo operated under the auspices of Wellington City Council. However, in June 2003 the zoo became a charitable trust and it is now governed by a board of six trustees, with Wellington City Council as the principal source of funds.

A report presented to Wellington City Council in June 2026 stated that the zoo was in surplus before the 2020 COVID-19 pandemic, but since then had been in deficit, even though visitor numbers had increased 25% since 2022. The zoo's auditors stated that "without improved stability between revenue and expenses, the zoo may not be a going concern as early as 30 June 2027". Cost increases in areas such as electricity, water and animal food were outstripping inflation by 1.9%, but it was not possible to reduce costs when dealing with animal welfare. Councillor Laurie Foon stated that the current funding model was not sustainable, and suggested options such as sharing funding with other councils in the Wellington region or adding revenue streams such as a glamping experience.

== History ==
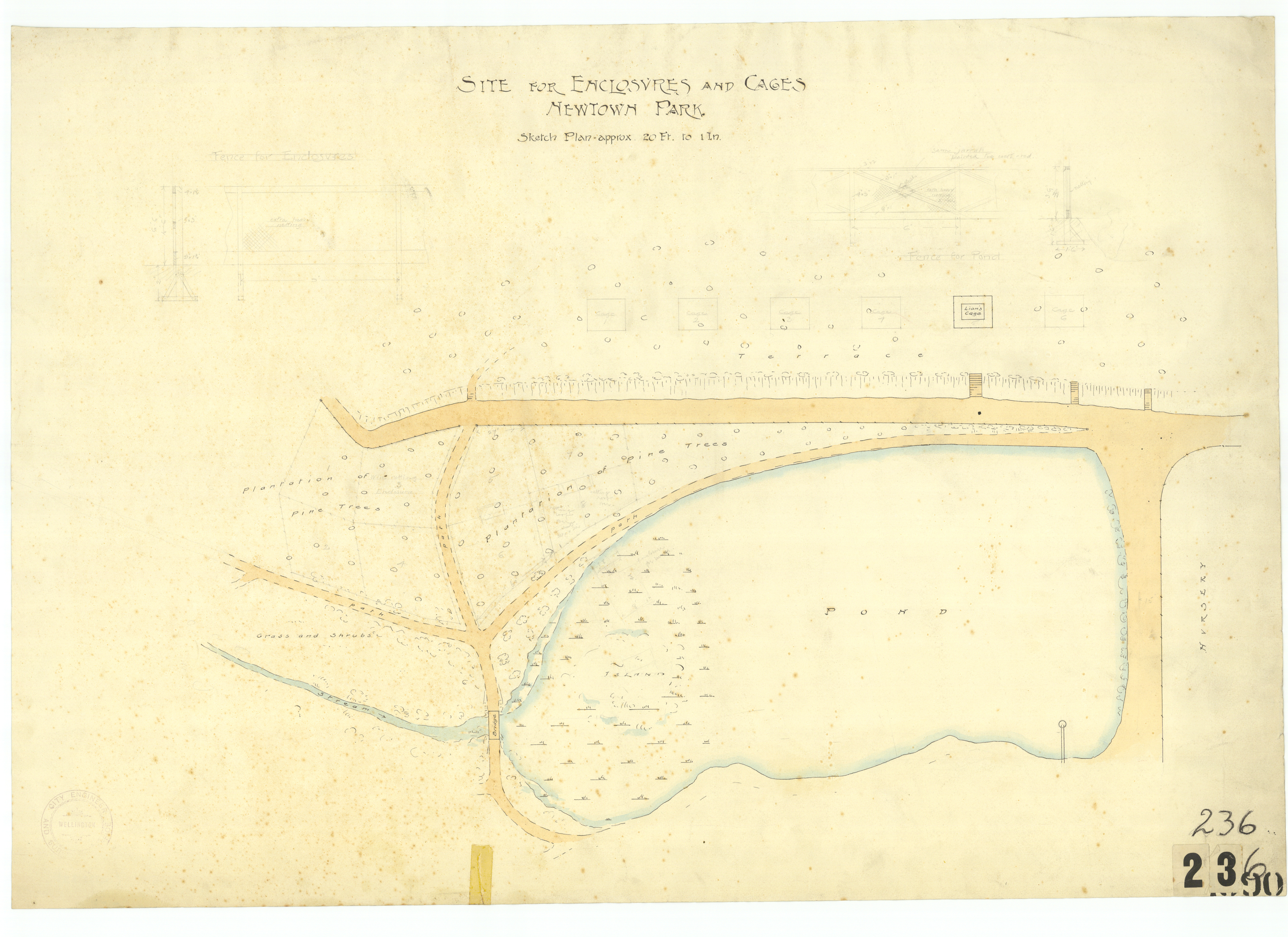
The beginning of the zoo: 1906 map showing the lake and swamp at Newtown Park, King Dick's cage and proposed locations of more cages.

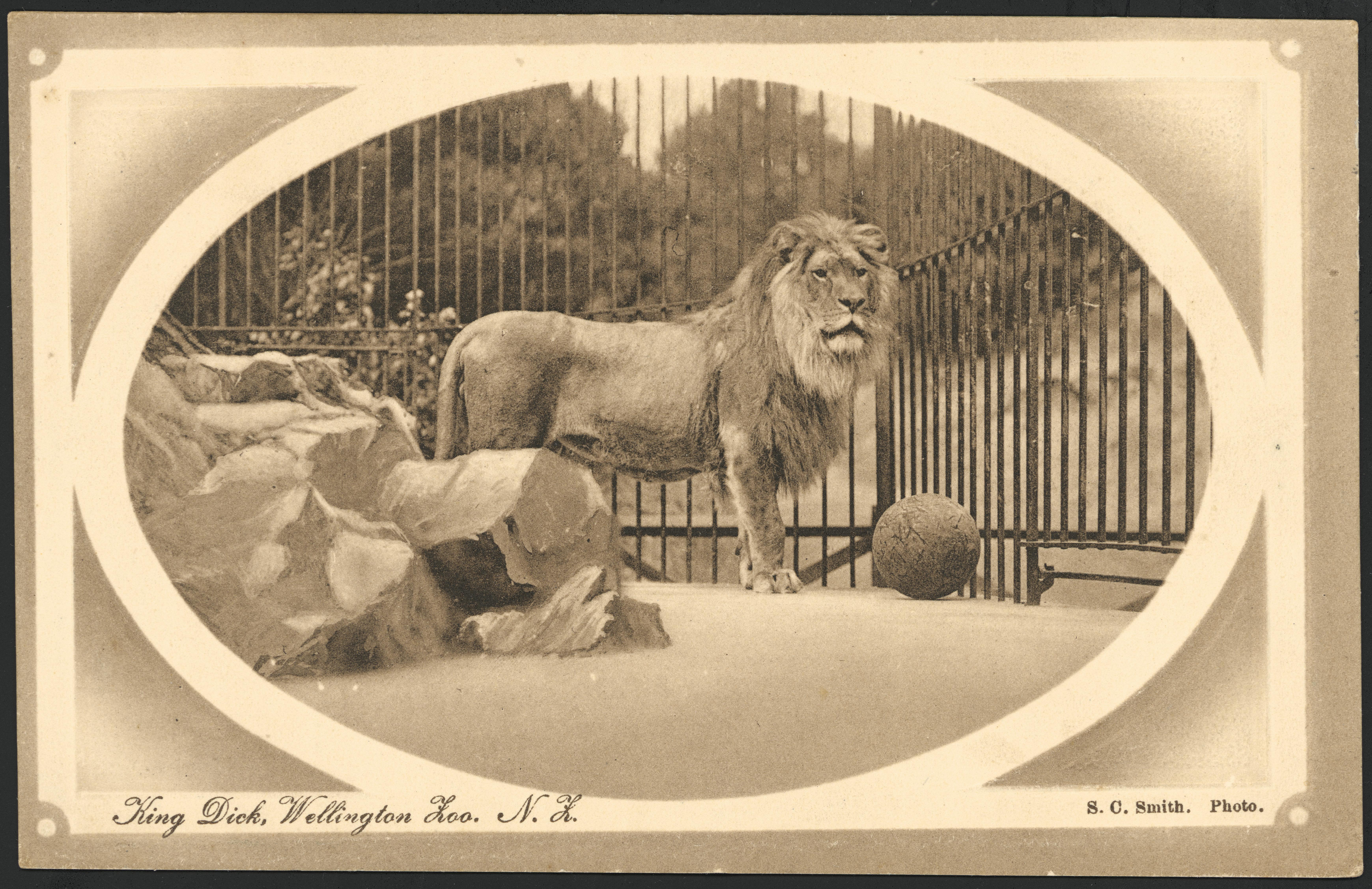
King Dick at the zoo, c. 1906–1915

Promoters of a zoo for Wellington met in April 1906 and proposed that part of Newtown Park be set aside for it. They had been offered a lion to start the collection. On 4 June 1906 the city of Wellington took possession of a young lion given to it by Bostock and Wombwell's Circus. The lion was placed into a cage near the lake in Newtown Park and was named 'King Dick' after prime minister Richard Seddon who died on 10 June 1906, less than a week after the lion's arrival. An emu that had been living at the Botanical Gardens was moved to an enclosure at the "zoo" in April 1907, but was killed soon after. The informal zoo, initially known as the Newtown Zoo or Newtown Park Zoo, grew as birds and animals were added. By 1909 King Dick had moved to a bigger enclosure, and the zoo collection included a camel, monkeys, a kangaroo, a wallaby and various birds. Admission charges were introduced in 1912. King Dick died in 1920. His taxidermied remains are now at the Wellington Museum.

Over time the zoo was expanded and upgraded. Criticism of the zoo in its early years centred around its ongoing costs and the conditions that the animals were kept in. When it opened in 1906, Wellington Zoo kept animals in cages, but by the 1920s there was a world-wide movement to replace the small cages of Victorian-era zoos with larger enclosures with natural barriers such as moats which would improve the living conditions of the animals. An example at Wellington Zoo is the bear pits built in 1928 to provide more space for the bears, with a moat separating the animals from the public. In 1928, Wellington City Councillors debated the merits of the zoo. Cr Semple stated that the zoo was dirty and bleak and a "torture den for dumb animals", and said the city should spend its limited funds on workers rather than the zoo. On the positive side, the zoo was said to have educational and financial value. 29,000 people had paid for admission in the previous year, and people travelling to the zoo by tram provided additional funds for the Council. By the mid-1930s some of the animals were housed in bigger, more natural enclosures. As the collection increased, new cages and enclosures were built and older ones repurposed for different animals. Animals held over the years include alligators, flamingos, sealions, an orangutan and a polar bear.

In 1966, Wellington City Council invited Charles Faust of the San Diego Zoo to Wellington to draw up a plan for redesigning the zoo along the lines of San Diego Zoo, with the aim of modernising the zoo with open habitats surrounded by moats and improving profitability. A new zoo entrance was completed in 1968 and monkey cages designed by Faust were built in 1969, but there were no funds to complete the Faust Plan. On Faust's recommendation, a nocturnal house was built in 1975.

The Archibald Centre opened in 1977. It was named after Robert Archibald, a former chairman of Parks and Reserves at Wellington City Council. The Archibald Centre is a function centre with meeting rooms that can be hired by the public.

A new enclosure for tigers was opened in 1985, part of the movement to improve animal welfare with bigger, more natural spaces.

A new lion exhibit opened in December 1992, coinciding with the arrival of three lionesses to join a male lion already at the zoo. The exhibit featured a large rocky outcrop and two viewing areas. As of 2026, the zoo was planning to build a new lion habitat for its two lions. This would cost almost $14 million.

The Wild Theatre was built in 2007. This is an indoor theatre, shelter and function space with tiered seating and a lean-to roof. The space can be used for educational programmes, performances and product launches.

Neighbours, the Australian precinct, was completed and opened in September 2013.

In September 2014, Wellington Zoo opened a new exhibit, Grassland Cats. It became home to the zoo's servals and two newly arrived caracals, which at the time were the only caracals in Australasia.

Meet the Locals He Tuku Aroa opened in 2015 as a collaboration between landscape architects Isthmus Group and the zoo. It took six years of planning and 18 months to build, and takes up a fifth of the Zoo's area. It consists of four zones (coast, farm, bush, mountains) simulating a journey from the sea to the mountains. Visitors can see native wildlife, farm animals, a community vegetable garden and a conservation display. The area includes Pōhutukawa Farm, where traditional farming may be observed. Many parts of Meet the Locals are interactive and designed for children to explore.

The zoo acquired had 23 baboons in 1967. In 2019, the zoo decided to euthanise its four remaining baboons, after a breakdown in their social structure which meant they were injuring themselves by fighting and were suffering from anxiety.

On 12 April 2023, two snow leopards arrived from Melbourne Zoo. Their custom-built habitat cost $6 million and took 18 months to build.

=== Lake and miniature train ===
When the zoo opened there was a large pond or lake near the entrance, which formed a habitat for swans and other waterfowl. In the 1950s a gondola provided rides on the lake.

At the south end of the lake was a raupo swamp which had silted up by 1966. This area was near the site of the future Archibald Centre. There was an island in the middle of the lake, which in 1966 was linked to the sides by bridges when a miniature train donated and operated by the local Lions Club was installed. The train carried visitors on a track around the lake and was popular with children. At this time a portion of the lake was cut off and became a pelican habitat.

The train ceased operation in May 1997 to make way for a three-year project to redevelop the lake area, with the new concept opening on 26 December 1997. The miniature train track around the lake was removed and the lake was largely filled in, creating two forested islands and some trails. Visitors could view primates across the water on the islands, while the animals were unable to cross the moats between them and the public. One island contained 22 capuchin and nine spider monkeys, and the other was home to three gibbons. In 1997 the miniature train was given to a Lions group in Timaru and put into service at Caroline Bay.

=== Elephants and elephant house ===
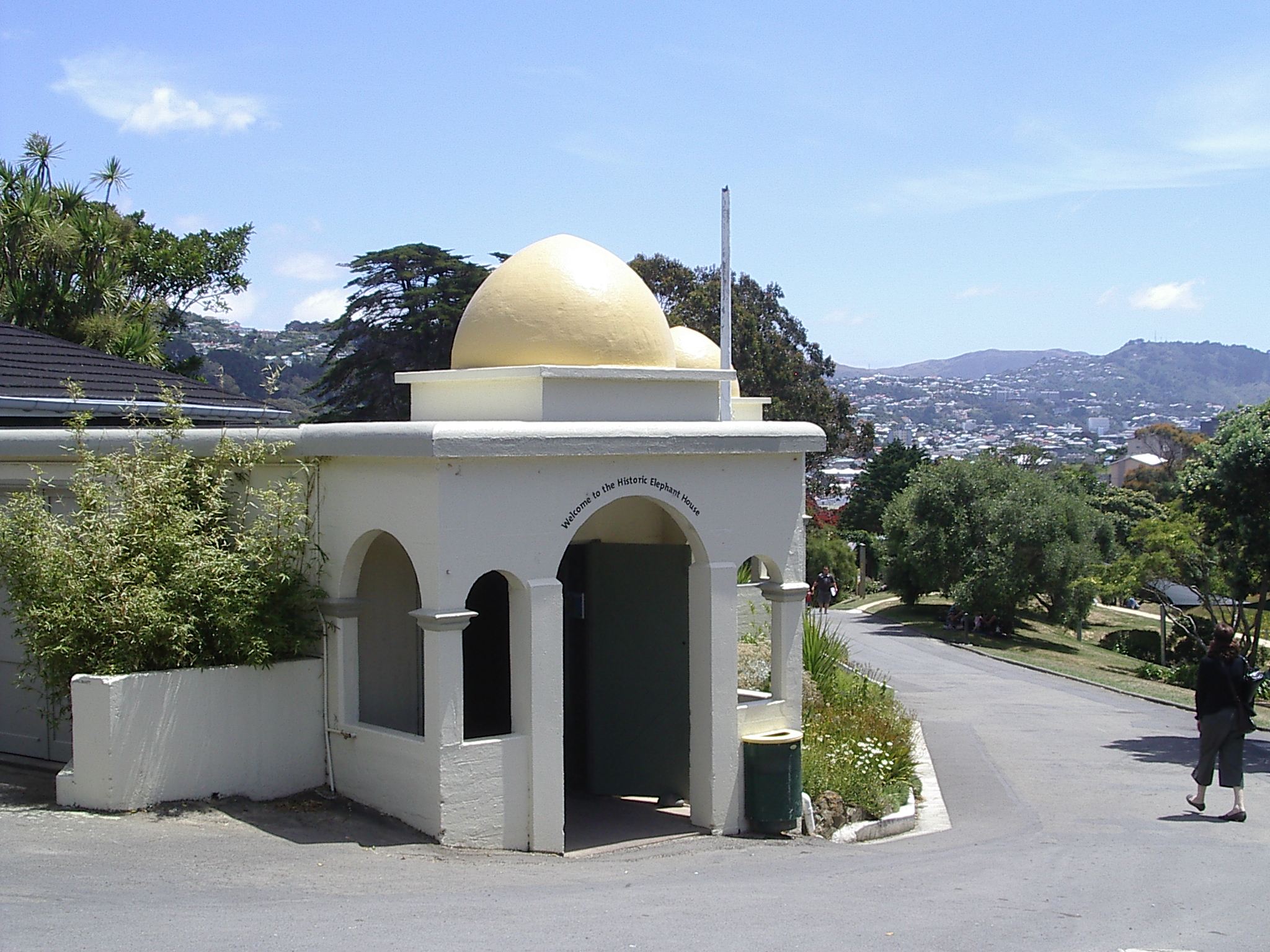
The elephant house

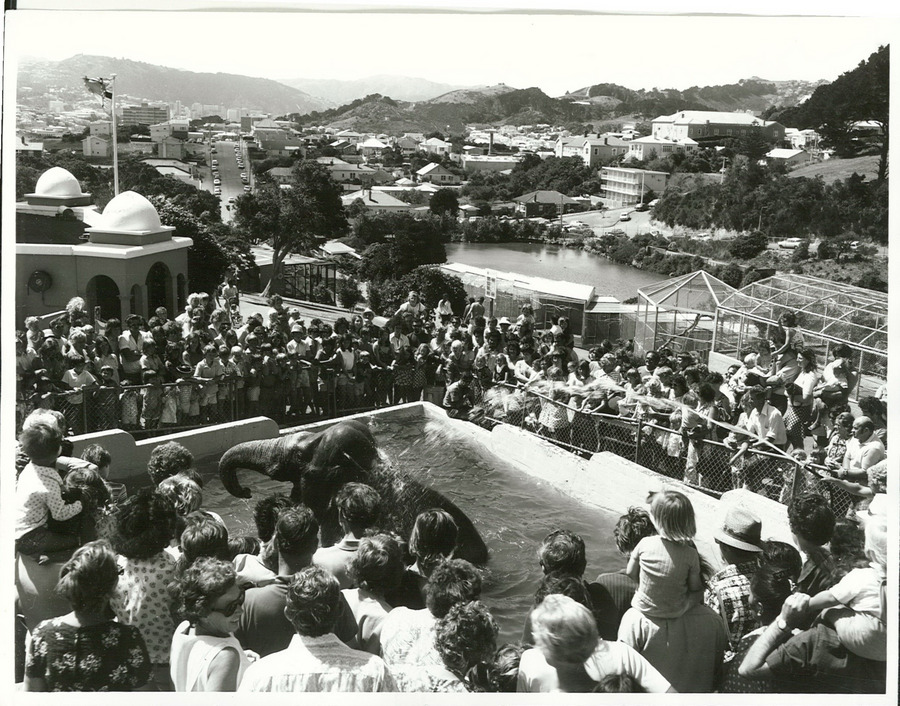
1975: An elephant having a bath. Elephant house in background.

The idea of acquiring an elephant was raised several times after the zoo opened. In 1925, Wellington City Council was offered an elephant but was unsure whether to accept. At a council meeting, Cr. Bob Semple stated "I am certainly going to record my vole against the expenditure of £375 of public money to purchase a beast to pen it up and torture it. Vote it [the funds] to a charitable purpose if there are not other uses for it in the city." The SPCA was also opposed to the purchase of an elephant.

After much discussion and debate, Wellington Zoo's first elephant Lily or Nellikutha ('Nellie'), a six-year-old female, arrived in 1927 as a gift from the Madras government. Nellikutha died in 1944 and was replaced in 1949 by Maharanee, bought from Wirth's Circus. In 1953, Maharanee was joined by 14-year-old Bhavani, who was renamed Kamala after a competition to choose a new name. Kamala was given to the zoo by the All India Women's Conference as a thank you for funds raised for India by the aid organisation CORSO.

Maharanee was euthanised in 1960 after suffering a foot infection for some time. She was replaced by Nirvana, who lived at the zoo from 1970 to 1973 before being sold to Ridgway's Circus. The zoo curator noted that Maharanee had never been "a completely tractable elephant" and had rarely given rides to children during her time at the zoo. On the other hand, Kamala was known as a friendly, placid and gentle animal who gave rides to thousands of children during her 30 years at the zoo. She died in 1983, and was the last elephant held at Wellington Zoo. Kamala was buried at the zoo, but her skeleton was later given to the Museum of New Zealand.

A domed elephant house was built at the zoo soon after Nellikutha's arrival in 1927, and there was also a bath and a stand, a structure which allowed children to climb stairs so that they could sit on a saddle on the elephant. After Kamala's death in 1983, the elephant house was used to house bats and reptiles and as a covered picnic area for visitors. The elephant's bath was converted to house meerkats in 1991. In 2010 the elephant house and stand were demolished to make way for a new complex known as 'The Hub', which housed a function space, children's play area, picnic area and café. The Hub opened in 2011. The historic façade and domes of the elephant house were retained in the new development.

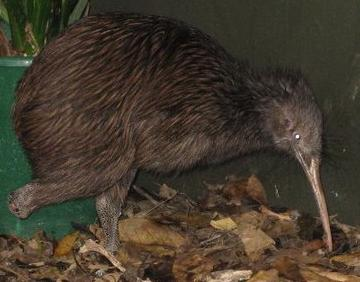
Tahi, the one-legged brown kiwi.

=== Nocturnal House and kiwi ===
The nocturnal house built in 1975, known as Twilight Te Ao Māhina, closed in 2021 after the death of Tahi, the last of three kiwi housed there. Tahi was a brown kiwi which was brought to the zoo after losing a leg in a gin trap. Tahi (his name means 'one' in Māori) had lived at the zoo for 15 years and was a popular attraction. Twilight reopened in 2023 after refurbishment, but one of the zoo's two new kiwi, Rawhiti, died in 2024. As of 2026, there are no kiwi at the zoo.

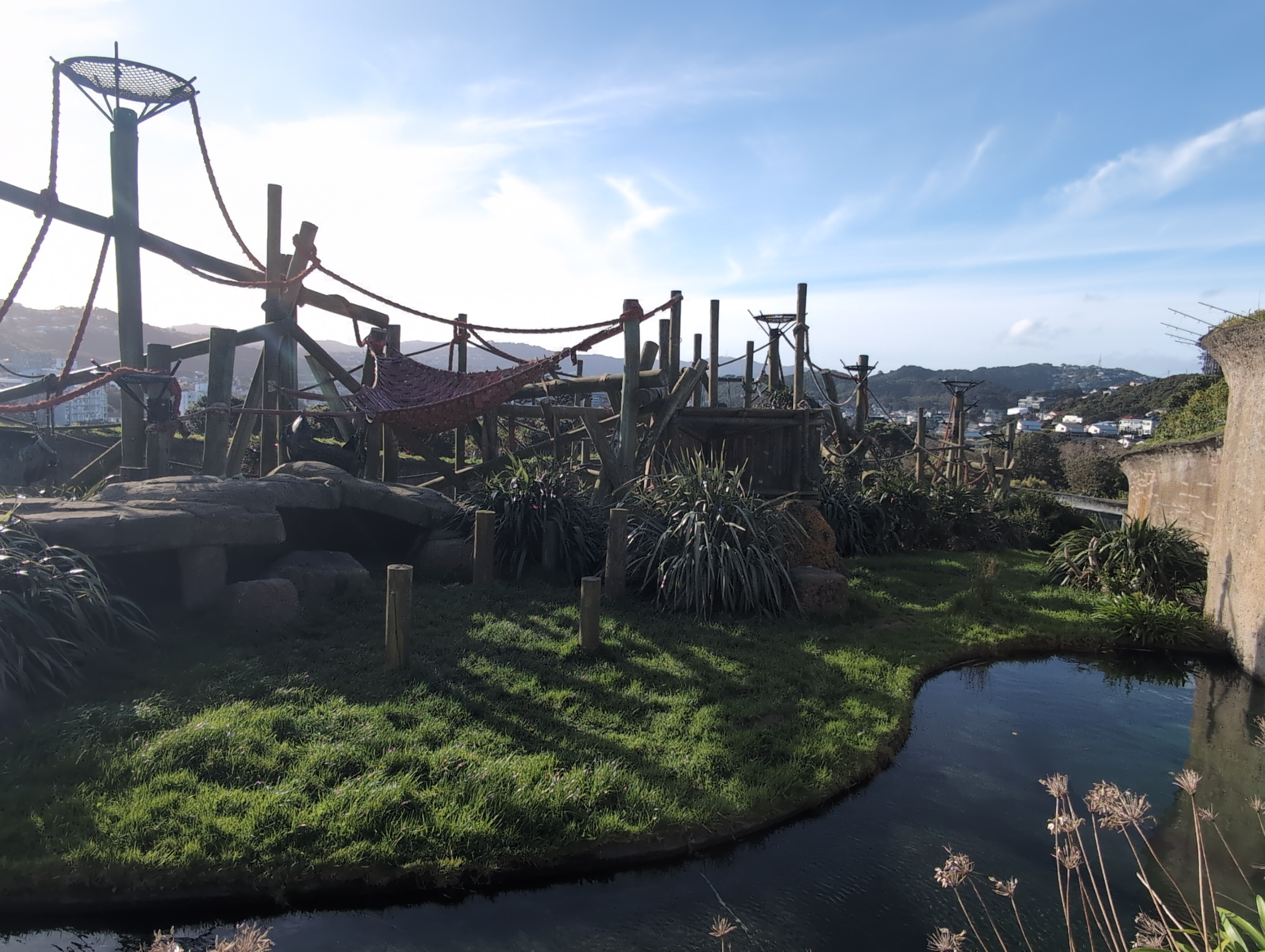
Chimpanzee habitat, 2026

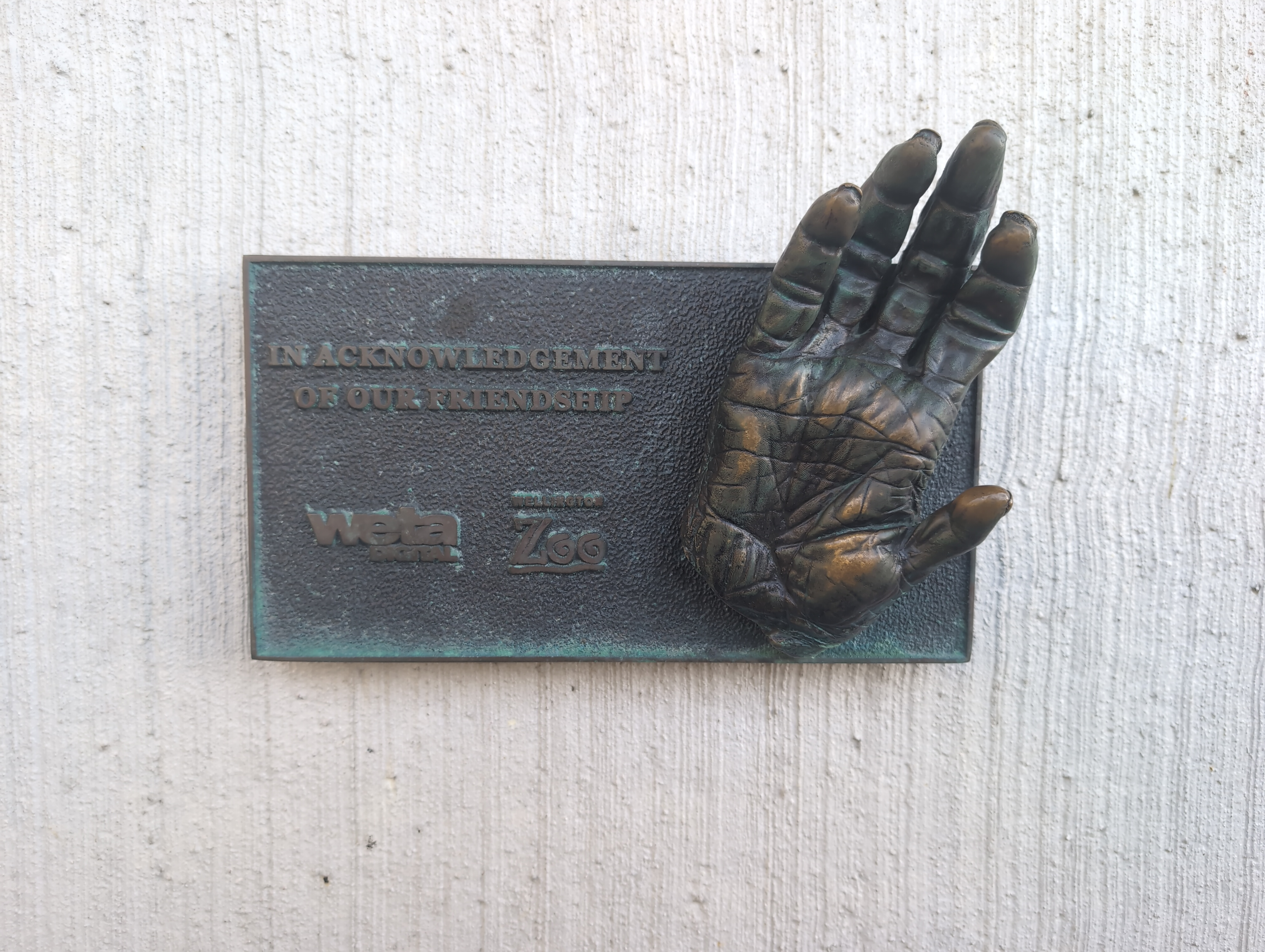
"In acknowledgement of our friendship" plaque by Wētā Digital

=== Chimpanzees ===
Wellington Zoo's first three chimpanzees were imported from London Zoo in 1956. They had been trained in London to perform a 'tea party' act. Chimpanzee tea parties were a popular attraction at the zoo, but were phased out during the 1960s. The last tea party at Wellington Zoo was held in February 1970. The first chimpanzee born in New Zealand was 'Patrick', born at Wellington Zoo on St Patrick's Day, 17 March 1960.

A new chimpanzee area was opened in December 1991, providing a more natural environment that fostered behaviour that was close to that of wild chimpanzees. By 1996 there were 13 chimpanzees at the zoo, and it was stated that this was the second-largest chimpanzee colony in the Southern Hemisphere outside of Africa.

From July to December 2018, further upgrades to the chimpanzee enclosure were made, and the disused Chimpanzee house was removed. A complex environment with new climbing structures, nests, hammocks and ropes was built to encourage natural behaviours. A new visitor area and playground at the bottom of the chimpanzee habitat has a glass viewing area that allows visitors to connect with the chimpanzees and lets the chimpanzees watch children playing. There were 10 chimpanzees at the zoo in December 2018 when the revamped habitat was opened.

Weta Digital staff visited the zoo to observe the chimpanzees during the making of the Planet of the Apes movie series, in order to understand how to make their digital chimpanzees move more realistically.

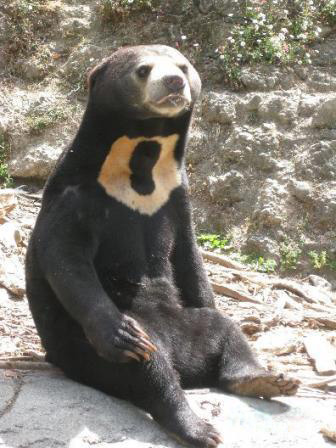
Sasa, the zoo's Malayan sun bear

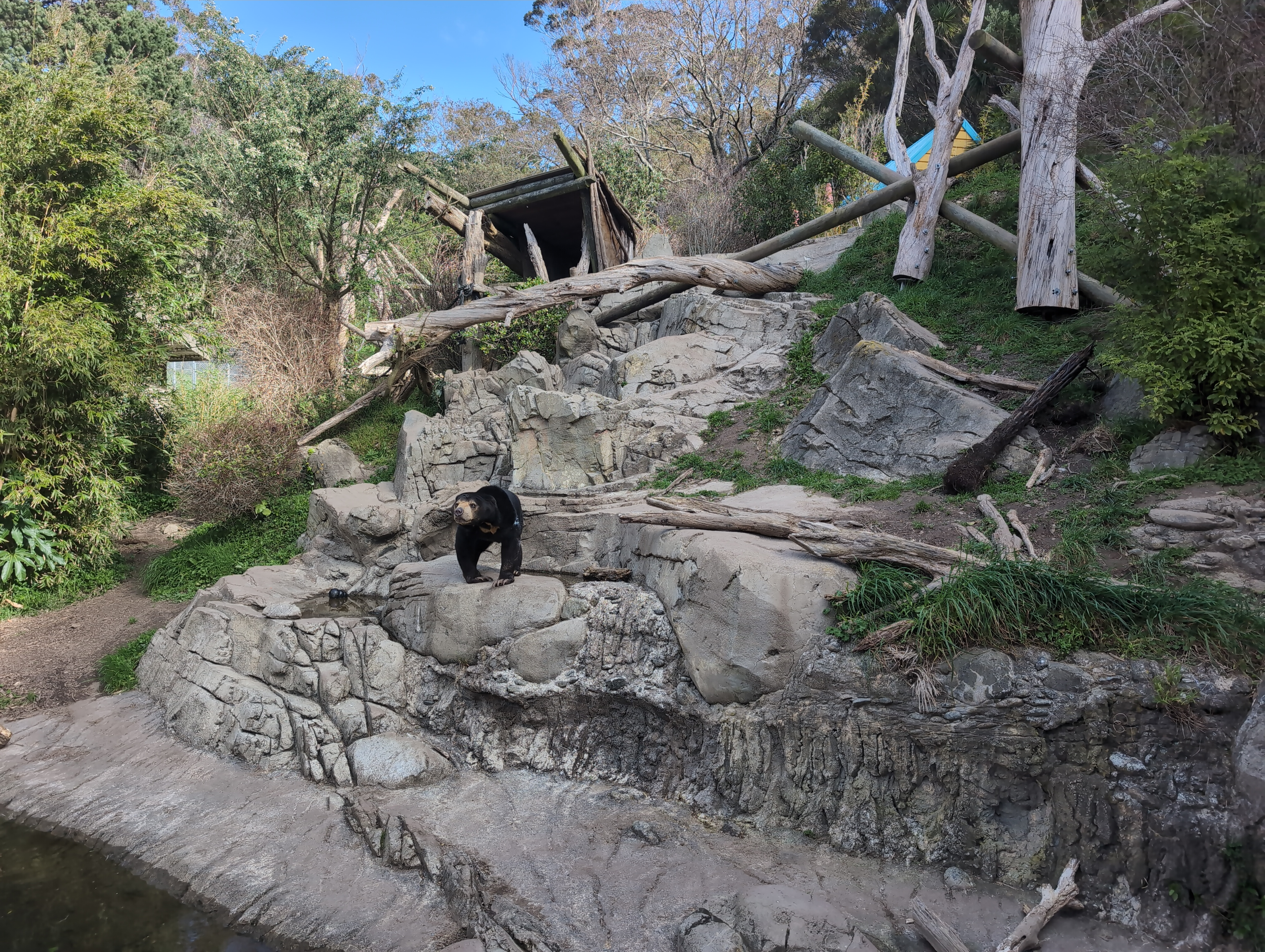
The sun bear habitat, 2026.

=== Bears ===
Wellington Zoo has held a variety of bears, beginning with a brown bear bought from Wirth's Circus in 1912 after it had attacked its circus trainer.

The zoo's first polar bear was bought from Auckland Zoo in 1925, and two more bears were acquired in late 1937. The older bear 'Floss' was killed by the new male bear in 1938. 'Cissy' the polar bear was nearly 100 when she was euthanised in 1950.

Bear pits were built on a slope at the zoo in 1928, providing much more space for the polar bear and black bears. The polar bear's pit had an enclosed den for shelter, and at the bottom of the pit was a deep V-shaped bath for the bear to dive or swim in. A zigzag path 360 ft long led up from the bath to a level space at the top of the slope. The pit for the black bears also had a bath but the slope was designed differently to allow for more scrambling up and down. Visitors could view the bears from above the bath area at the bottom of the slope.

In 1992, two Malayan sun bears were brought from San Diego Zoo and homed in one of the bear pits. The female, Chomel, gave birth to a cub (Sasa) in September 2006. At that time, Wellington Zoo was the only zoo in Australasia to successfully breed a sun bear. In September 2012, the zoo opened a new enclosure for its two remaining sunbears. As of 2026 Sasa remains at the zoo and is the only bear in New Zealand.

=== Giraffes ===
Newspaper reports show that the zoo had a giraffe as early as 1936. A giraffe house was built in 1957 but the giraffe due to live in it died during the voyage to New Zealand. The zoo got more giraffes in the late 1980s. A new giraffe habitat was built in 2006 and expanded in 2024. In 2023 a giraffe was born in Wellington Zoo for the first time in 20 years. As of 2026, there are four giraffes at the zoo.

== Incidents ==
=== 1967 tiger escape ===
On 18 March 1967 a zookeeper failed to properly secure a tiger enclosure, leading to the escape of two tigers named Napoleon and Josephine. The tigers were seen walking the streets in the suburb of Newtown where the zoo is located. The two animals were tracked down overnight and eventually killed after advancing aggressively toward police and a group of circus performers who were attempting to contain Josephine with a net. There was considerable public outrage at the killing of the animals particularly as Josephine had already been shot with two tranquilizer darts. Police said their actions were necessary to ensure public safety.

=== 2006 lion mauling ===
In 2006 zookeeper Bob Bennett was mauled by two lions, Malaik and Zulu, when an unlocked gate allowed them entry into the area where he was laying out their food. He was rescued by zookeepers and sustained relatively minor injuries. The incident featured in an episode of Untamed and Uncut.

=== 2011 'Happy Feet' ===
Happy Feet was an emperor penguin found at Peka Peka beach in June 2011 after travelling about 3,200 kilometres (2,000 mi) from Antarctica. The penguin was unwell after ingesting sand, so it was taken to the animal hospital at Wellington Zoo for treatment. Spectators were able to watch through a window while veterinarians treated the penguin. At the zoo, Happy Feet's enclosure was kept at 8 °C (46 °F) and was fitted with a bed of ice to mimic his natural environment. The penguin was provided access to an outdoor saltwater pool, which he swam in when air temperatures were sufficiently low. He was in Wellington for 10 weeks before being released into the Southern Ocean.

=== 2018 attempted monkey theft ===
On 7 April 2018, a man broke into the zoo overnight with the intent to steal a squirrel monkey for his girlfriend. He entered the zoo through an unsecured gate and used bolt-cutters to break through two padlocks to enter the monkey enclosure. Several monkeys suffered injuries from the break-in. All of the monkeys were distressed following the break-in, and one continued experiencing stress for several months. The man broke a leg, fractured two teeth and sprained an ankle. The theft attempt failed and no monkeys escaped: two were found in the neighbouring golden lion tamarin enclosure, and one female, initially feared to be stolen, was found injured and frightened, hiding in the enclosure.
