= Jenny Rowan =

New Zealand local politician

Jenny Rowan QSO JP
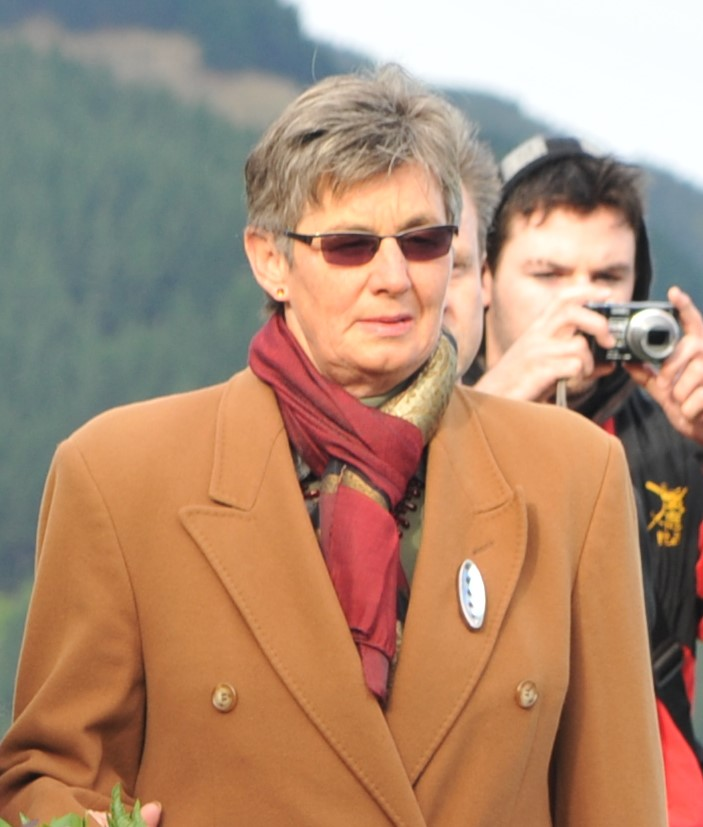
- Rowan in 2010

5th Mayor of Kāpiti Coast
- In office 2007–2013
- Preceded by: Alan Milne
- Succeeded by: Ross Church

1st Mayor of Inglewood District
- In office 1986–1989
- Preceded by: New position
- Succeeded by: Position abolished

Personal details
- Born: October 1949 (age 76)
- Spouse: Juliet Joslin (m. 2006)

Jennifer Daphne Rowan QSO JP (formerly Simpson; born October 1949) is a New Zealand former politician. She served as mayor of the Kāpiti Coast from 2007 to 2013, and was the first openly lesbian mayor in the country.

== Career ==
Rowan was mayor of Inglewood District from 1986 until the 1989 local government reforms. She was then elected to the Taranaki Regional Council and served as deputy chair until 1991. She was a commissioner of the Environment Court of New Zealand from 1991 to 2007, and served as deputy chair of the Paekākāriki Community Board from 2004 to 2006.

Rowan was elected mayor of Kāpiti Coast in 2007, defeating six opponents including former mayor Iride McCloy. Major issues of her mayoralty included council spending, the Kāpiti Expressway, sea level rise, and water metering. These issues led to her failing to be re-elected in 2013, placing third behind Ross Church and K Gurunathan.

== Personal life ==
In 1995, Rowan and her partner Juliet "Jools" Joslin were one of three lesbian couples who unsuccessfully applied for marriage licences. In January 1996, they took part in a commitment ceremony in Wellington. They took their case to the High Court in Quilter v Attorney-General in May, but the court ruled against them and the Court of Appeal upheld the ruling in December 1997. On 30 November 1998, they sued New Zealand before the United Nations Human Rights Committee. The committee rejected the case on 17 July 2002. In 2006, they flew to Canada to be legally married. On 17 April 2013, they were in the public gallery to witness the passing of the Marriage (Definition of Marriage) Amendment Act 2013, which legalised same-sex marriage in New Zealand.

Rowan was appointed a Companion of the Queen's Service Order, for public services, in the 1990 New Year Honours. She was also awarded the New Zealand 1990 Commemoration Medal.
