= Dunedin Wildlife Hospital =

Specialist veterinary hospital in New Zealand for native species

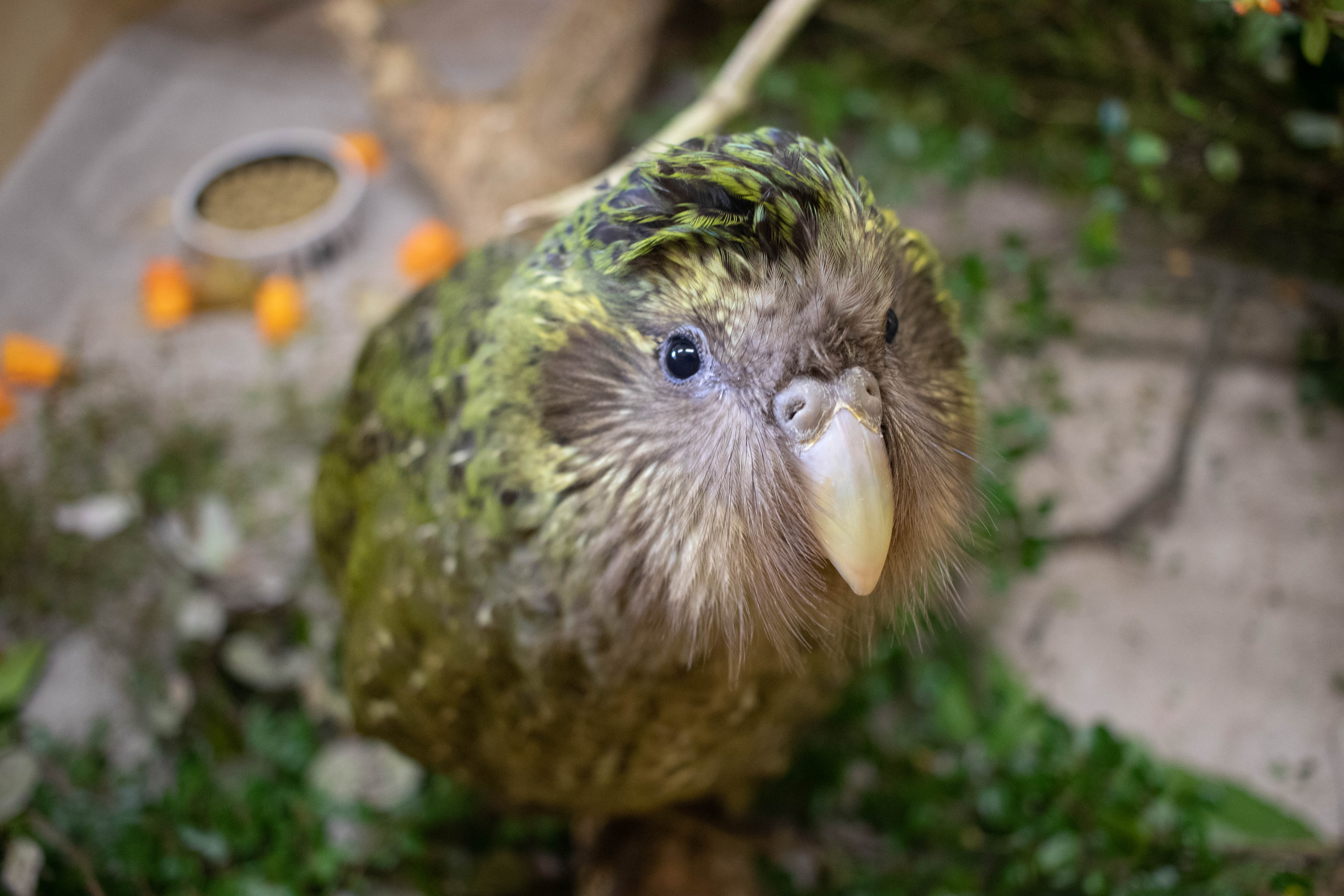
A kākāpō (Strigops habroptilus) receiving treatment at the Dunedin Wildlife Hospital in 2019

Dunedin Wildlife Hospital is a specialist veterinary hospital located in Dunedin, New Zealand. The hospital provides medical treatment and rehabilitation of native wildlife. Since opening in 2018, the hospital has cared for many of New Zealand's threatened species, including the yellow-eyed penguin, kākāpō, and kiwi.

== Background ==
The hospital officially opened in January 2018 led by wildlife veterinarian Lisa Argilla, based at the Otago Polytechnic School of Veterinary Nursing. The first patients admitted to the hospital were two yellow-eyed penguins. The Dunedin Wildlife Hospital opened as the first clinic dedicated to treating native birds in the South Island, improving their survival success compared to being transported to the North Island for treatment.

Funding for the hospital comes from a combination of donations, sponsorships, and grants from the Dunedin City Council.

== Patients ==
The hospital largely treat hoiho (yellow-eyed penguins); the nearby population of which is declining as a result of poor breeding success and high mortality. Penguins treated by the hospital often suffer from bite injuries, along with issues during breeding season such as disease and starvation. In 2022, the hospital successfully incubated and hatched eggs for the first time. The next year the hospital hand-reared 214 chicks, as it was estimated that 50 to 70% of chicks would have died without intervention. Following treatment, penguins often continue to receive rehabilitation at a nearby eco-reserve run by the Otago Peninsula Eco Restoration Alliance, before being released back into the wild.

Kererū are also frequent patients, with many receiving broken wings and fractured breast bones from flying into windows. The hospital treated 105 kererū during their first year of operation.

Several kākāpō, a critically endangered parrot with less than 250 individuals left, have been admitted to the hospital. Kākāpō have required treatment for diseases including Aspergillosis, a fungal lung infection, and exudative cloacitis, which causes inflammation of the lower digestive and reproductive tracts. During the 2019 breeding season, the hospital helped rear chicks to assist with the recovery programme.

Other species treated by the hospital include:

- Tarāpunga (red-billed gull), including multiple individuals that were suffering from gunshot wounds in 2023, and one that was witnessed being attacked by two people and required treatment for fractured bones in 2025.
- An endangered toroa (northern royal albatross) from the Taiaroa Head colony suffering from liver failure, which made a full recovery.
- A pūteketeke (Australasian crested grebe) which needed stomach surgery after swallowing a fishhook, and was successfully released back into the wild.
- Two tuatara, including one which required treatment and surgery to remove a tumour caused by a fungal infection.
- A Buller's mollymawk which was found in suburban Dunedin and admitted to the hospital due to being underweight, and was released three weeks later after gaining more than a kilogram.
- A Stewart Island kiwi which needed treatment for deep soft tissue injuries after she was found tangled in a fence.

As of May 2024, the Dunedin Wildlife Hospital had treated more than 3500 individuals, including 1093 hoiho, 85 kākāpō and 18 northern toroa. About 60% of patients held a threatened, endangered or critically endangered status, and more than 80% of patients were returned to the wild.
