= Peka Peka =

Rural locality in Wellington Region, New Zealand

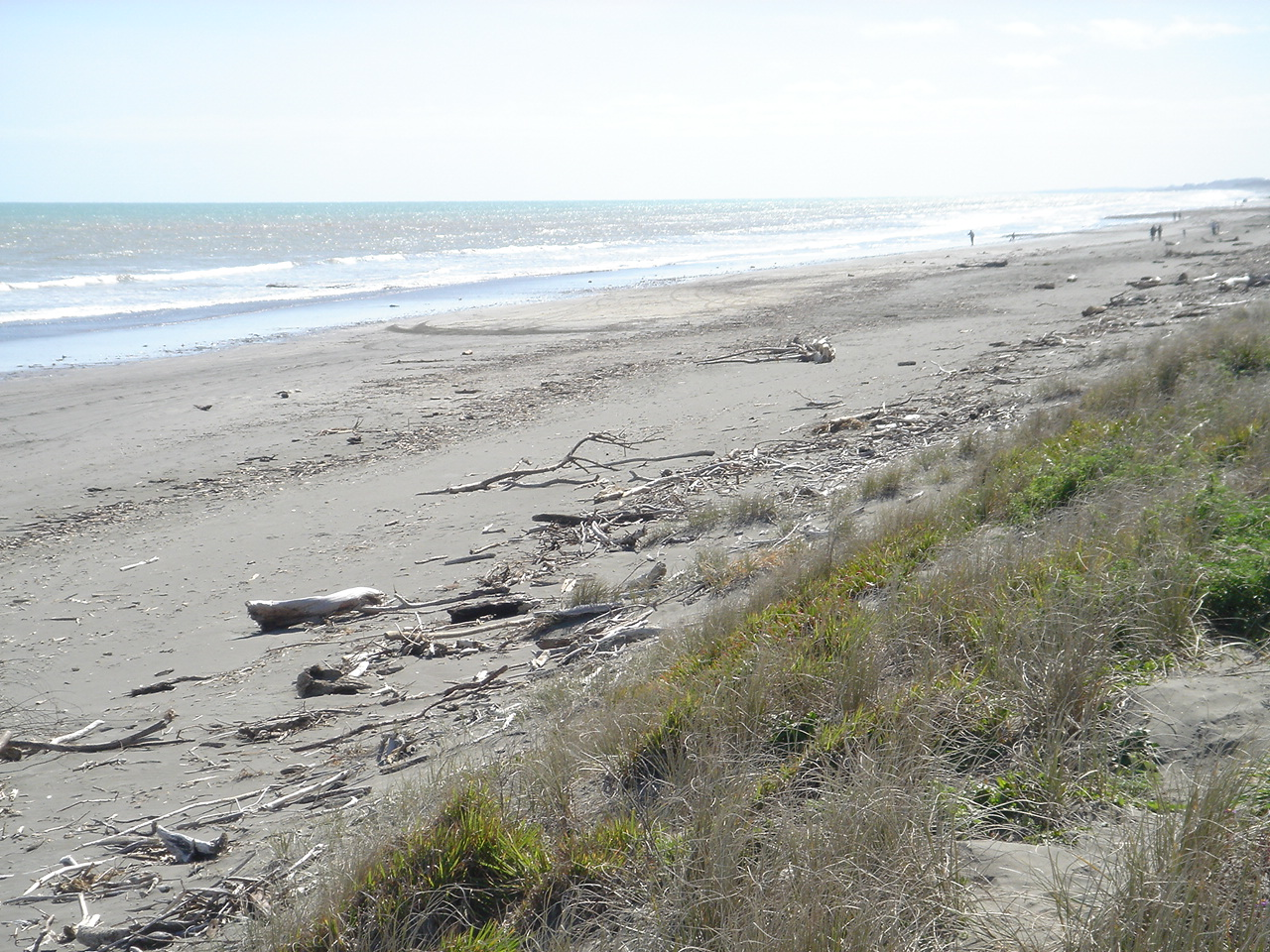
- Peka Peka Beach, looking north
- Interactive map of Peka Peka
- Coordinates: 40.8327°S 175.0581°E
- Country: New Zealand
- Region: Wellington Region
- Territorial authority: Kāpiti Coast District
- Ward: Waikanae Ward
- Community: Waikanae Community
- Electorates: Kapiti; Te Tai Hauāuru (Māori)

Government
  - Territorial Authority: Kāpiti Coast District Council
  - Regional council: Greater Wellington Regional Council
  - Kāpiti Coast Mayor: Janet Holborow
  - Kapiti MP: Tim Costley
  - Te Tai Hauāuru MP: Debbie Ngarewa-Packer

Area
  - Total: 10.02 km^{2} (3.87 sq mi)

Population (June 2025)
  - Total: 730
  - Density: 73/km^{2} (190/sq mi)

Peka Peka, sometimes spelled Pekapeka, is a seaside locality on the Kāpiti Coast of New Zealand's North Island. It is located just off State Highway 1 and the North Island Main Trunk railway between Waikanae and Te Horo.

Peka Peka was briefly internationally famous when a young emperor penguin, nicknamed Happy Feet, appeared on Peka Peka beach on 21 June 2011. Emperor penguins are usually only found in the Antarctic. It had been 44 years since the species was last spotted in the wild in New Zealand.

Peka Peka Beach is a clothing-optional beach by custom. New Zealand has no official nude beaches, as public nudity is legal on any beach where it is "known to occur".

== Demographics ==
Peka Peka statistical area covers 10.02 km^{2} (3.87 sq mi). It had an estimated population of 730 as of June 2025, with a population density of 72.85 people per km^{2}.

Historical population
Year	Pop.	±% p.a.
2006	357	—
2013	504	+5.05%
2018	612	+3.96%
2023	702	+2.78%

Peka Peka had a population of 702 in the 2023 New Zealand census, an increase of 90 people (14.7%) since the 2018 census, and an increase of 198 people (39.3%) since the 2013 census. There were 345 males and 354 females in 276 dwellings. 2.6% of people identified as LGBTIQ+. The median age was 54.5 years (compared with 38.1 years nationally). There were 81 people (11.5%) aged under 15 years, 72 (10.3%) aged 15 to 29, 330 (47.0%) aged 30 to 64, and 216 (30.8%) aged 65 or older.

People could identify as more than one ethnicity. The results were 92.7% European (Pākehā), 7.3% Māori, 1.7% Pasifika, 3.4% Asian, and 3.4% other, which includes people giving their ethnicity as "New Zealander". English was spoken by 98.3%, Māori by 2.6%, Samoan by 0.4%, and other languages by 8.5%. No language could be spoken by 0.9% (e.g. too young to talk). New Zealand Sign Language was known by 0.4%. The percentage of people born overseas was 25.2, compared with 28.8% nationally.

Religious affiliations were 26.1% Christian, 0.4% Hindu, 1.3% Islam, 1.3% Buddhist, 0.9% New Age, 0.4% Jewish, and 0.4% other religions. People who answered that they had no religion were 64.5%, and 4.7% of people did not answer the census question.

Of those at least 15 years old, 201 (32.4%) people had a bachelor's or higher degree, 309 (49.8%) had a post-high school certificate or diploma, and 99 (15.9%) people exclusively held high school qualifications. The median income was $46,400, compared with $41,500 nationally. 144 people (23.2%) earned over $100,000 compared to 12.1% nationally. The employment status of those at least 15 was 264 (42.5%) full-time, 105 (16.9%) part-time, and 6 (1.0%) unemployed.
