= Kāpiti Coast District Council =

Territorial authority in New Zealand

Kāpiti Coast District Council Te Kaunihera ā-Rohe o Kāpiti
- Brand logo

Type
- Type: Territorial authority of Kāpiti Coast District
- Term limits: None

History
- Established: 1 November 1989; 36 years ago
- Preceded by: Kapiti Borough Council; Otaki Borough Council; Horowhenua County Council
- New session started: 18 October 2025

Leadership
- Mayor: Janet Holborow, Ind. since 15 October 2022
- Deputy: Martin Halliday, Ind. since 30 October 2025
- CEO: Darren Edwards since 10 October 2022

Structure
- Seats: 11 (including mayor)
- Political groups: Independent (10); Te Pāti Māori (1)
- Length of term: 3 years

Elections
- Voting system: First-past-the-post
- First election: 14 October 1989
- Last election: 11 October 2025
- Next election: 14 October 2028

Meeting place
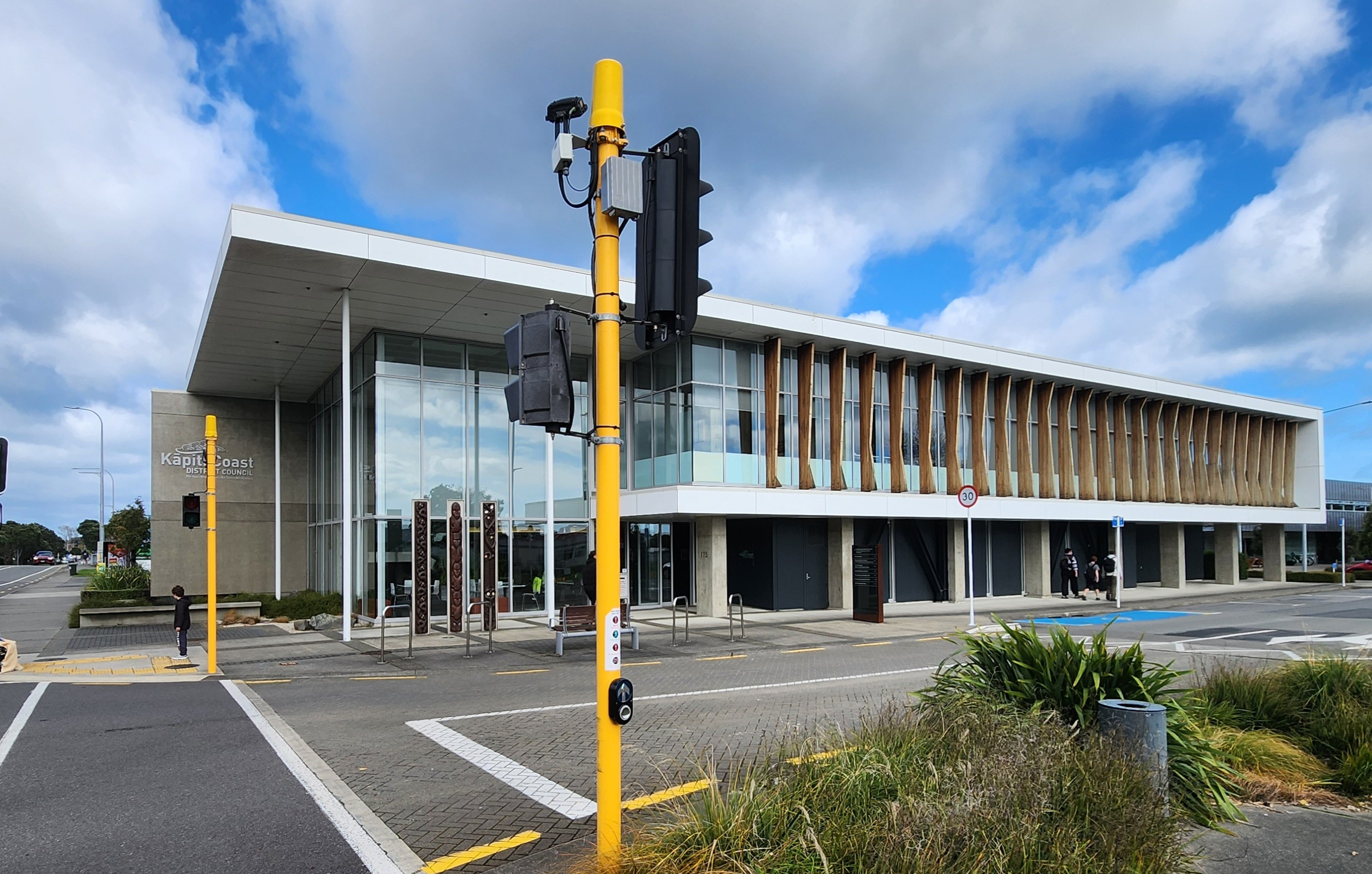
- 175 Rimu Road, Paraparaumu

Website
- kapiticoast.govt.nz

Kāpiti Coast District Council (abbr. KCDC; Māori: Te Kaunihera ā-Rohe o Kāpiti) is the territorial authority for the Kāpiti Coast District of New Zealand. It serves as the district's local government alongside the Greater Wellington Regional Council as the regional council. The current entity has existed since 1989, prior to which local government in the area was split between three local authorities.

The governing body of the council has 10 councillors and is chaired by the mayor of Kāpiti Coast (currently Janet Holborow since October 2022).

== Governing body ==
=== Mayor ===
One mayor is elected at-large; they chair meetings of the governing body and act as the head of local government in the district.

=== Current composition ===
The current members of the governing body of council are:

Role	Portrait	Name	Affiliation	Ward
Mayor		Janet Holborow	Independent	Elected at-large
Deputy		Martin Halliday	Independent	Paraparaumu
Councillor		Glen Cooper	Independent	Paraparaumu
Councillor		Glen Olsen	Independent	Paraparaumu
Councillor		Rob McCann	Independent	Districtwide
Councillor		Liz Koh	Independent	Districtwide
Councillor		Himiona Grace	Te Pāti Māori	Kāpiti Coast Māori
Councillor		Heniti Buick	Independent	Ōtaki
Councillor		Bede John Laracy	Independent	Paekākāriki-Raumati
Councillor		Steve Botica	Independent	Waikanae
Councillor		Jocelyn Prvanov	Independent	Waikanae

== Community boards ==
The Kāpiti Coast District Council has created five local community boards, under the provisions of Part 4 of the Local Government Act 2002, covering the district:

- The Paekākāriki Community Board representing the area including Paekākāriki, Emerald Glen and Whareroa Road in the north;
- The Paraparaumu Community Board, representing the area from Paraparaumu through to Otaihanga;
- The Raumati Community Board, representing the area including Raumati Beach and Raumati South;
- The Waikanae Community Board, representing the area from Waikanae Downs in the south through to Peka Peka and Te Horo in the north. The Ward boundary is the middle of Te Horo Beach Road and School Road.
- The Ōtaki Community Board represents the area from north of Te Horo Beach Road and School Road, Te Horo, Ōtaki North to Forest Lakes.

Community boards are primarily advocates for their local area, and they also administer community grant funding.
