= Mayor of Kāpiti Coast =

Head of New Zealand's Kapiti Coast District

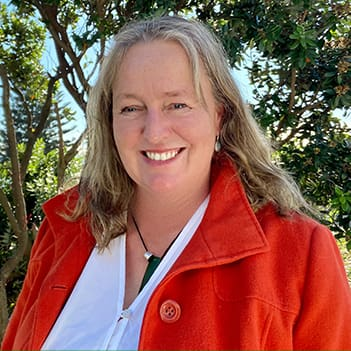
- Incumbent; Janet Holborow since 2022
- Style: His/Her Worship
- Term length: Three years
- Inaugural holder: Iver Trask
- Formation: 1989
- Deputy: Martin Halliday
- Salary: $145,588
- Website: Official website

The mayor of Kāpiti Coast officiates over the Kāpiti Coast District Council.

Janet Holborow is the current mayor of Kāpiti Coast. She was elected to the position in 2022 after serving as Deputy Mayor from 2016 to 2022, and as a member of the Kapiti Coast District Council for 18 years.

== List of mayors ==
Since its inception in 1989, the Kāpiti Coast District has had eight mayors:

	Name	Portrait	Term
1	Iver Trask		1989–1992
2	Brett Ambler		1992–1998
3	Iride McCloy		1998–2001
4	Alan Milne		2001–2007
5	Jenny Rowan		2007–2013
6	Ross Church		2013–2016
7	K Gurunathan		2016–2022
8	Janet Holborow		2022–present

== List of deputy mayors ==
Name	Term	Mayor
Ann Chapman	2001–2010	Milne
Ann Chapman	2001–2010	Rowan
Roger Booth	2010–2013	Rowan
Mike Cardiff	2013–2016	Church
Janet Holborow	2016–2022	Gurunathan
Lawrence Kirby	2022–2025	Holborow
Martin Halliday	2025–present	Holborow
