= Feilding Old Boys Oroua Rugby and Netball Club =

NZ rugby union club, based in Feilding and Kimbolton

Feilding Old Boys Oroua
Club information
- Full name: Feilding Old Boys Oroua Rugby and Netball Club
- Colours: Black, Red and White
- Founded: -
- Website: https://www.sporty.co.nz/foborouarnc/Home-of-The-Stags

Current details
- Ground: Johnston Park, Feilding & Kimbolton, Manawatu
- Competition: Hankins Shield

Feilding Old Boys Oroua is a rugby and Netball club based at Nelson Street in Feilding and Kimbolton Road in Kimbolton, Manawatū District, New Zealand. It is a constituent club of the Manawatu Rugby Union and playing under the name "The Stags", although the club is often referred to as "FOBO".

In 2009 the Feilding Old Boys RFC merged with the Oroua club, based in Kimbolton. The club also combined rugby and netball clubs.

The main rival club is Feilding commonly referred to as Feilding Yellows. The respective club-rooms are based on either side of the rugby field at Johnston Park.

== Oroua ==
An Oroua union was formed in 1896 comprising teams from Cheltenham, Colyton, Ruahine, Birmingham (now Kimbolton) and Āpiti. The union was disbanded in 1898 and in 1909 Oroua became a sub-union of the Manawatu Rugby Union.

The Oroua Rugby Football Club started in 1957. Its first senior game was on 27 April against Marist at Rangiwahia, winning 9-0. The team’s coach was J W Cuming and the captain was J B Corpe. Their manager was A J Wood and President W F Ellen.

== Honours ==
The Stags made the 2010 Hankins Shield final but lost 11–10 to the Massey University team. In 2018 the Stags went one better to win the Hankins Shield beating the Feilding Yellows 24–22 in the final. The club's women's team have won the Prue Christie Cup in 2015, 2016 and 2018.

== All Blacks ==
=== Jack Finlay ===
Jack Finlay, All Black number 455, was born 31 January 1916 in Normanby. He played all his club rugby for Feilding Old Boys and made the Manawatu team as an 18 year old in 1934. He played club rugby as a forward and was selected for three All Black trials in 1937, twice as a prop and once as a hooker. However he mostly played in the five eighths for Manawatu in his 59 appearances.

Finlay's rugby career went on hold while he served in the Army in World War II reaching the rank of Major and winning a Military Cross. After the war he represented and was vice captain of the 1945/6 2nd New Zealand Expeditionary Force rugby team known as the "Kiwis". He played in 23 of the 38 games, including the three "internationals" in Britain against England, Scotland and Wales.

Showing his versatility, his one test match was at No 8 for the All Blacks in their 31-8 victory at Dunedin during the 1946 Australia rugby union tour of New Zealand.

Finlay later served as a selector for Manawatu (1949), the North Island (1949-63) and New Zealand (1961–63). In 1964 he coached the New Zealand Colts side on a tour of Australia.

He died on 30 June 2001 in Feilding.

=== Sam Strahan ===
Standing 6 foot 4, Sam Strahan represented Manawatu for 12 seasons and also played 45 matches (17 internationals) for the All Blacks between 1967 and 1973 as a lock.

Strahan was educated at Apiti School, Huntley Preparatory School and Wanganui Collegiate. At the age of 22, he was selected by Fred Allen for the All Blacks "NZRFU 75th Jubilee Test" against Australia at Athletic Park in 1967. Although he was Manawatu's 14th All Black, he was only the second after Arthur Law to be born in Manawatu. He was the locking partner of Colin Meads and said to be "the best lineout jumper in the country".

At the Oroua RFC 2002 Annual General Meeting, the club made Strahan a life member.

Strahan was the Manawatu Rugby Union president from 2003 to 2006. In 2009 he co-opted fellow All Blacks Frank Oliver, John Callesen, Gary Knight and Mark Donaldson when advocating for the retention of the Manawatu Turbos in the National Provincial Championship. He died at home in Kiwitea on 21 December 2019.
