= Maewa railway station =

Defunct railway station in New Zealand

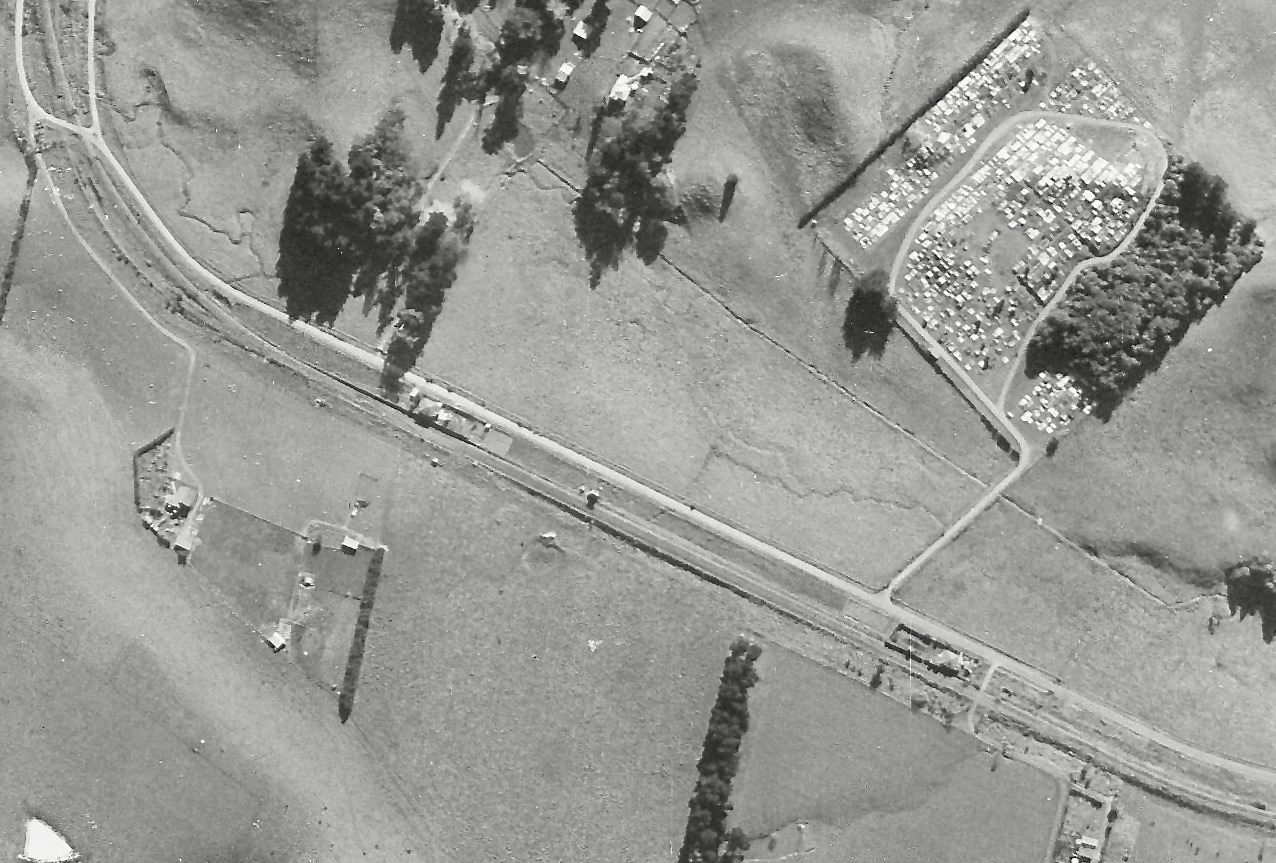
- Maewa railway station and cemetery in 1949

General information
- Location: New Zealand
- Coordinates: 40.190152°S 175.55088°E
- Elevation: 120 m (390 ft)
- Line: North Island Main Trunk
- Distance: Wellington 157.89 km (98.11 mi)

History
- Opened: 27 February 1914
- Closed: pre 1993
- Electrified: June 1988

Services
Preceding station	Historical railways	Following station
Halcombe; Line open, station closed 7.12 km (4.42 mi)	North Island Main Trunk; KiwiRail	Makino Road; Line open, station closed 2.36 km (1.47 mi)
Location

Maewa railway station was a tablet station on the North Island Main Trunk in New Zealand. A passing loop remains at the station site.

In 1987 the loop was measured to be 157.89 km (98.11 mi) from Wellington, though the old station was slightly further north at 158.61 km (98.56 mi).

Near the former station the Steam Traction Society runs a steam fair for traction engines. Another collection of old vehicles is nearby at Austin Mews.

Also nearby is Feilding Cemetery. The first recorded burial there was in November 1886, though the trustees discussed the neglected state of the cemetery in 1882 and the cemetery predated the railway.

== History ==
Trains started to run on the line when the Feilding – Halcombe Section opened on Monday 22 April 1878. To ease congestion between Palmerston North and Marton, the loop was opened at Maewa in 1914, it being noted on 27 February that a tablet porter was needed. It was not intended for passenger traffic, though described as a flag station in 1921. From 1933 a goods train stopped at Maewa, carrying Feilding passengers visiting the cemetery. The station closed before 1993. Electric lighting was introduced in 1938, the loop was extended in 1939 and work was done to ease the gradient for trains from Halcombe, though it still didn't stop trains stalling on it.
