= Oroua River =

River in New Zealand

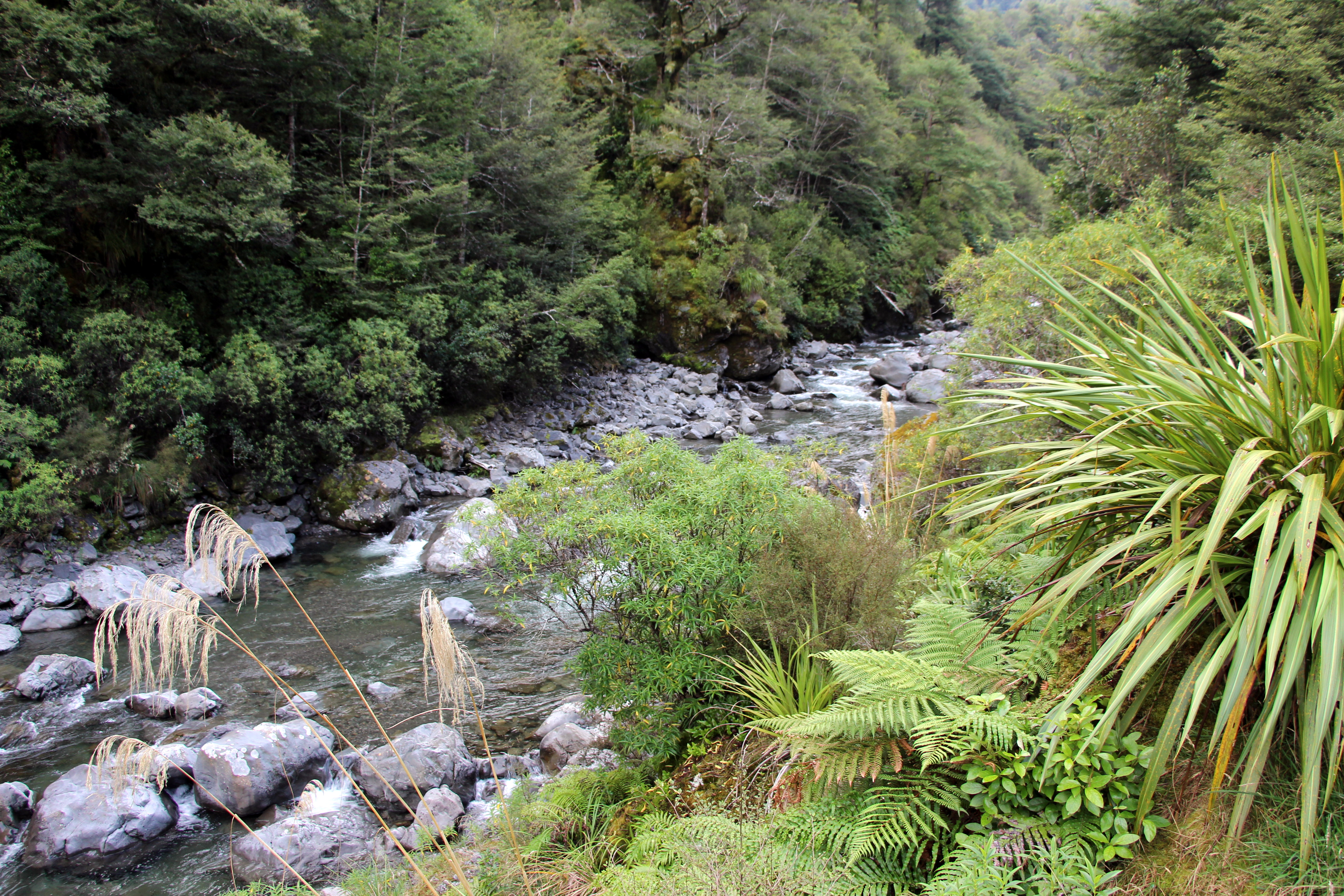
- Oroua River next to Iron Gate Hut in the Ruahine Ranges in 2016

Location
- Country: New Zealand

Physical characteristics
- Source
  - location: Ruahine Ranges
- Mouth: Manawatū River
  - coordinates: 40°26′13″S 175°26′14″E
- Length: 131km

The Oroua River is a river of the southwestern North Island of New Zealand.

== Name ==
The New Zealand Ministry for Culture and Heritage gives a translation of "place of dredging for shellfish" for Ōroua.

== Description ==
The Oroua River is a tributary of the Manawatū River, it flows generally southwestward from its source in the Ruahine Range. In its upper reaches, near the small town of Āpiti, the river passes through a deep gorge before emerging onto plains south of Kimbolton.

Near Feilding, the Oroua River is fed by the Makino and Kiwitea streams, which are both significant tributaries. The river passes along the eastern edge of Feilding, through Timona Park, where it is a popular local swimming spot. Beyond Feilding, the river feeds into the Manawatu River just to the west of Opiki (between Palmerston North and Shannon).

== Water quality ==
Oroua River is in the bottom 25% of New Zealand's most polluted waterways. Some significant causes include run-off from local agriculture and issues relating to the Feilding Wastewater Treatment Plant. A 2011 report concluded that the quality fell from fair to poor at the AFFCO meat works effluent discharge point, but a 2015 resource consent application claimed an 87% improvement in that effluent quality.

In spite of this, Oroua was awarded the New Zealand River award from Land, Air, Water Aotearoa (LAWA) for significant improvements in dissolved reactive phosphorus, nitrogen, e. coli, and turbidity.

== Wildlife ==
Near the top of the Oroua River is one of the most significant whio populations. It is the southernmost wild population of the bird in the North Island.

== Flooding ==
The river, and surrounding areas, have been the site of many floods over the years. Major flooding has been recorded in the area in 1880, 1897, 1902, and 1953.

In February 2004, significant rainfall in the surrounding streams caused a once-in-a-hundred-years flood. The flooding forced over 500 people from their homes and over $100 million in damage.

The plains near Opiki have also faced flooding where the river meets the Manawatū River.
