= Rangiwahia =

Settlement in New Zealand

- Village
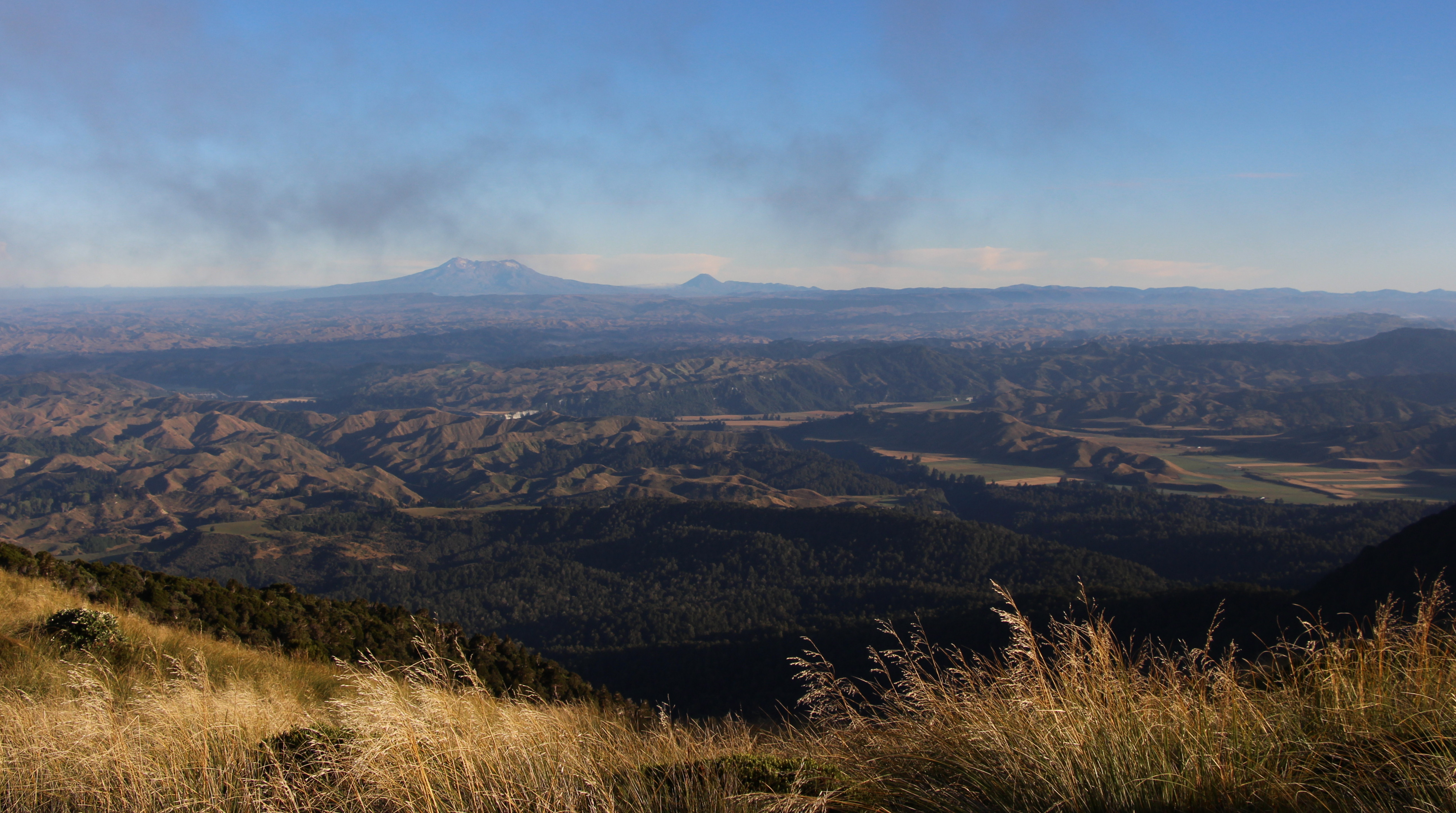
- View from Rangiwahia Hut to Ruapehu in 2016
- Interactive map of Rangiwahia
- Coordinates: 39.89918°S 175.89232°E
- Country: New Zealand
- Region: Manawatū-Whanganui region
- District: Manawatū District
- Ward: Manawatū Rural General Ward; Ngā Tapuae o Matangi Māori Ward
- Electorates: Rangitīkei; Te Tai Hauāuru (Māori)

Government
  - Territorial Authority: Manawatū District Council
  - Regional council: Horizons Regional Council
  - Mayor of Manawatu: Michael Ford
  - Rangitīkei MP: Suze Redmayne
  - Te Tai Hauāuru MP: Debbie Ngarewa-Packer

Area
  - Territorial: 120.40 km^{2} (46.49 sq mi)

Population (2023 Census)
  - Territorial: 111
  - Density: 0.922/km^{2} (2.39/sq mi)
- Time zone: UTC+12 (NZST)
  - Summer (DST): UTC+13 (NZDT)

Rangiwahia is a small, elevated, farming settlement in the North Island, New Zealand, 26 km (16 mi) northeast of Kimbolton in the Manawatū-Whanganui region. It is in the Kiwitea valley, near the Whanahuia Range of the Ruahines. Due to its height and the nearby ranges, Rangiwahia has a mean annual rainfall of 1267mm; 309mm more than Feilding's.

Rangiwahia is on two of the tourist-promoting 'Country Road' drives from Feilding. It has several scenic reserves, an arts centre, a church, fire station, tennis court, playground, public toilets, halls and a camp site.

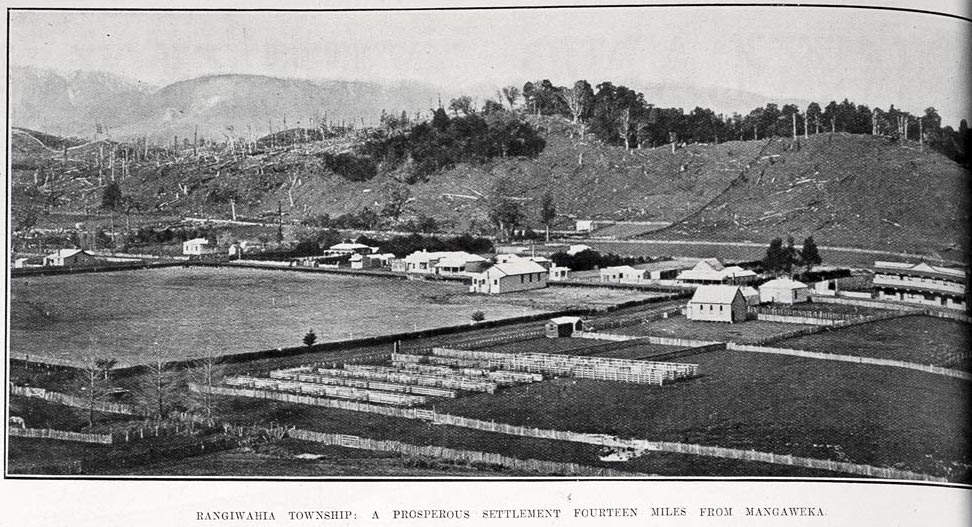
Rangiwahia in 1908

== History ==
Until settlement in the 1880s, there was dense forest, dominated by red beech (Nothofagus fusca, or tawhai raunui). A clearing with a view of the sky would have been notable; hence the name Rangi, which translates as sky, and wahia, as broken.

Rangiwahia district was part of the Otamakapua block, government purchase of which began in 1876. There was an unsuccessful appeal, before the purchase was declared to be settled in 1884. A 2012 Crown Forestry Rental Trust report says Ngāti Apa claimed the area and concludes that "the Crown employed methods – notably pre-title advances, selective payments, and notifications – to draw all owners into the sale and purchase process and to exercise a large measure of control over the prices which the original owners received." It goes on to say the Crown ignored the impact on customary food-gathering and protection of places of historical and cultural importance. The archaeology map shows only one site in a large area east of the Rangitīkei valley, but Block No. 2 had been used as a summer hunting ground, mainly for kererū and eels.

In 1885 the MP for Whanganui and Minister for Lands, John Ballance, encouraged Charles L Pemberton to form a Special Settlement Scheme to develop these "waste Lands". On 10 February 1885, a meeting was called in Whanganui and formed the Pemberton Small Farms Association to buy the Pemberton Block of 7,245 acres (2,932 ha). C. L. Pemberton had said the Otamakapua block was suitable. He and Charles Feild, on a Government party making the road through Kimbolton for the Palmerston North Small Farm Association, had seen the block from Peep-o-Day. Pemberton climbed a tree and drew a rough plan of the country, which was sent to the Government. They surveyed sections of 50 to 150 acres (61 ha) and sold them at £1 per acre, with 2s 6d an acre added to pay the cost of the survey. A draw for them was held on 27 September 1886, by a process considered to be unfair when examined in 1903. Successful applicants were given 10 years to pay. Dudley Eyre was secretary of the Association and collected £1,057 in survey fees, but absconded with the money to the USA in 1888. He had been a Thames goldfield surveyor, before moving to Whanganui. He seems to have moved to Salt Lake City and then San Francisco, where his wife inherited some money. He was charged with the theft in 1901, but the charge was dropped, as he was said to have returned the money and moved to Waikato. The government decided to be lenient with payment of the stolen fees. An 1897 report said the Pemberton Improved-farm Settlement was mostly under grass, with 13 farms, 43 people, 112 cattle, 10 horses, 19 pigs and 654 sheep.

Pemberton, about 2 mi (3.2 km) to the west of Rangiwahia, was bought by the Pemberton Settlement Association from the government for £465. In the 1890s Rangiwahia was developed as the main village by later settlers.

=== Shops ===
A petition in 1893 asked for a post office nearer than Pemberton. The Post Office opened in July 1893, was rebuilt in 1912 and burnt down in the 1990s. Another store opened in November 1893.

Rangiwahia once also had a garage, saddlery, blacksmith, butcher, butter factory, sale yards, halls, schools, boarding houses, 3 churches, saw mills, a rugby club with 2 teams, tennis courts, a golf club (until 1997) and Frank Heise's hotel, which was used by skiers until it burnt down in 1958.

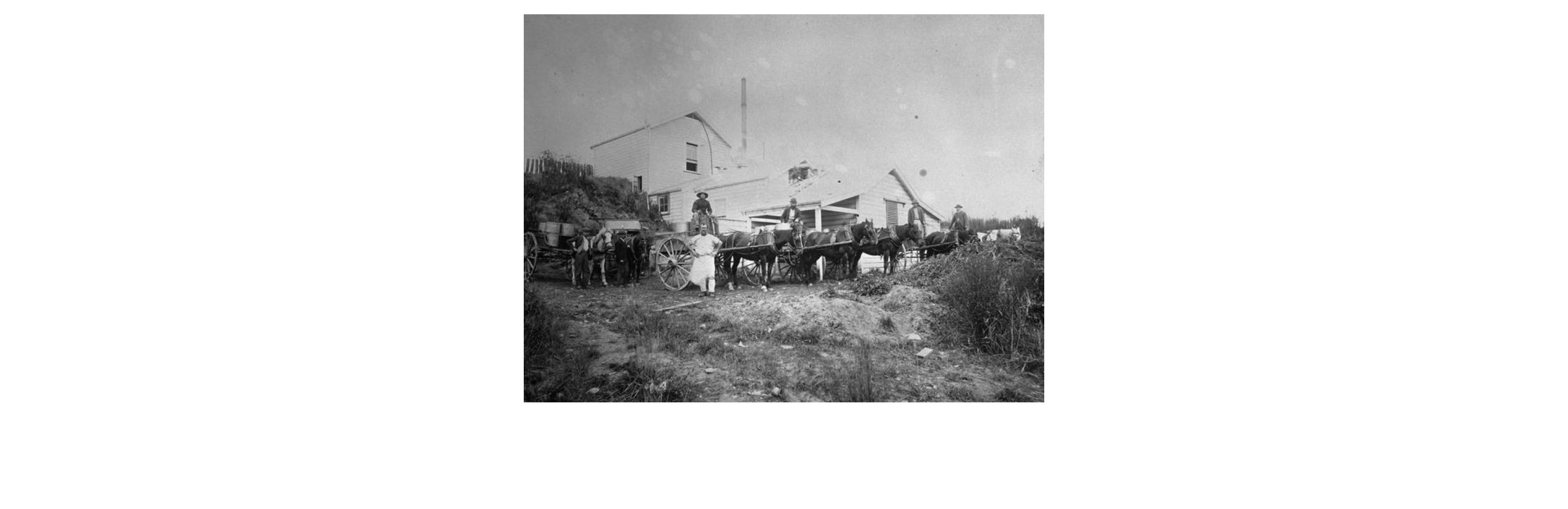
Rangiwahia dairy factory between 1898 and 1906

=== Dairying ===
Rangiwahia butter factory started on 23 December 1898 and produced its first butter in 1899 600m south of the village. 'Quail' won a vote to be its trademark. Creameries were built at Main South and Ruahine. the latter closing around 1910. Ruahine had a Cheese Factory from 1910 to 1918. 'Quail' butter won as World Championship Butter at the Auckland Winter Exhibition in 1925. On 15 February 1936, a new factory opened, with electric power, which had reached Rangiwahia in 1927. During the 1950s dairying declined as wool and meat prices improved. Since 2000, dairy farming has returned, with large farms on Karewarewa Road, Main South Road and on the Marton Block. The dairy is now home to REACT, formed to inspire sustainable use of materials through coppicing and reuse/recycling.

=== Telephone ===
Telephone offices opened in 1897 at Peep-o-Day, Pemberton and Rangiwahia. Eventually, there were 5 lines, with some 20 phones on each, connecting through the store at Rangiwahia.

=== Education ===
The initial Pemberton settlement had schools to the south at Mangarimu and to the north at Ruahine, the latter built in 1897. Mangarimu closed in 1937 and Ruahine in 1944. When Makino Road school closed, its building was moved to Bluff Road in 1945. Bluff Road School was still a polling place for Peep-o-Day in 1963.

In 1891 Pemberton school opened, but closed in 1896 after Rangiwahia School opened in 1895. Other schools around the district were Karewarewa and Main South. From 1937 they too closed, transferring pupils to the new Rangiwahia school, built in 1938, when it gained a 3rd form class. The old school building then became a Play Centre, until it was demolished and the Centre moved to the Memorial Hall. Rangiwahia became a district high school in 1947, but, by the end of 1949, the secondary school had only 7 pupils and closed in 1950. There were then 101 students at the school, aged 5 to 17. The older students travelled to Feilding high schools. In 1962 there were 81 students. Rangiwahia only had 2 pupils in 2013, though it had 30 a few years earlier. It closed on 25 January 2014 and was demolished in December 2014.

=== Halls ===
==== Rangiwahia Hall ====
Rangiwahia Hall was built in 1909. On 14 November 1921 the local MP and Minister of Lands, David Guthrie, unveiled a memorial to 21 World War I soldiers alongside the hall. The granite obelisk is on a stepped concrete base. 8 names were added after World War II.

In 1985 the kitchen and supper room were renovated for Rangiwahia's Centennial in 1986. The hall still has a matai floor and tennis courts, a camp site, public toilets and the old school's playground beside it. Just inside the Domain fence, a row of trees includes a scarlet oak and a copper beech.

==== Memorial Hall ====
Across the road, and now used by the playgroup, the Memorial Hall was opened by the Minister of Internal Affairs, Sir William Bodkin, on 28 April 1954. Ruahine School's wooden tablet in the hall lists 8 who died and 27 others who served in World War I. Mangarimu School has a marble tablet listing 18 men.

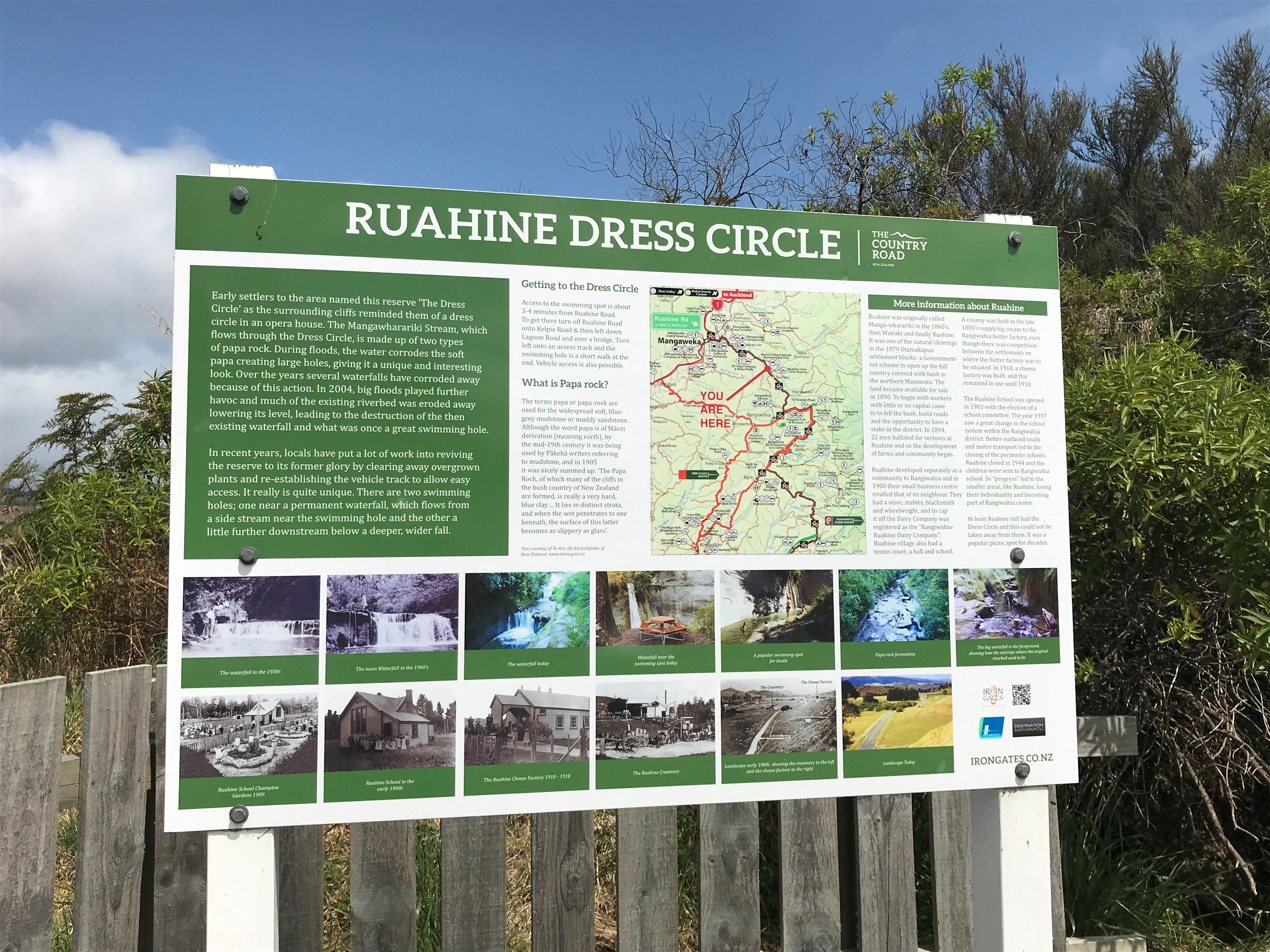
Ruahine Dress Circle Information Board

== Demographics ==
Rangiwahia locality covers 120.40 km^{2} (46.49 sq mi). It is part of the larger Kiwitea statistical area.

Historical population
Year	Pop.	±% p.a.
2006	174	—
2013	126	−4.51%
2018	114	−1.98%
2023	111	−0.53%

Rangiwahia had a population of 111 in the 2023 New Zealand census, a decrease of 3 people (−2.6%) since the 2018 census, and a decrease of 15 people (−11.9%) since the 2013 census. There were 54 males and 57 females in 54 dwellings. The median age was 41.4 years (compared with 38.1 years nationally). There were 18 people (16.2%) aged under 15 years, 21 (18.9%) aged 15 to 29, 57 (51.4%) aged 30 to 64, and 18 (16.2%) aged 65 or older.

People could identify as more than one ethnicity. The results were 91.9% European (Pākehā), 13.5% Māori, 2.7% Pasifika, and 8.1% Asian. English was spoken by 97.3%, Samoan by 2.7%, and other languages by 5.4%. No language could be spoken by 2.7% (e.g. too young to talk). The percentage of people born overseas was 10.8, compared with 28.8% nationally.

Religious affiliations were 32.4% Christian, and 2.7% New Age. People who answered that they had no religion were 62.2%, and 8.1% of people did not answer the census question.

Of those at least 15 years old, 12 (12.9%) people had a bachelor's or higher degree, 63 (67.7%) had a post-high school certificate or diploma, and 21 (22.6%) people exclusively held high school qualifications. The median income was $35,100, compared with $41,500 nationally. 3 people (3.2%) earned over $100,000 compared to 12.1% nationally. The employment status of those at least 15 was 54 (58.1%) full-time, 15 (16.1%) part-time, and 3 (3.2%) unemployed.

== Scenic reserves ==
There are several scenic reserves nearby, including -

- 66.05 ha (163.2 acres) Dress Circle Scenic Reserve,
- 4.95 ha (12.2 acres), C L Pemberton Memorial Park Scenic Reserve,
- 57.04 ha (140.9 acres) Mangoira Scenic Reserve and
- 1.2 ha (3.0 acres) McKinnon Memorial Reserve.

The Ian McKean Pinetum contains more than 300 species of conifer on 14 ha (35 acres) between Rangiwahia and Āpiti.

Mangahuia Wetlands, off Main South Road, were built in 1997 by a farmer, who planted exotic and native shrubs and trees.

=== Rangiwahia Hut ===
Rangiwahia Hut is a 12-bed hut in the Ruahine Forest Park, about 12 km (7.5 mi) east of Rangiwahia. It is on the tussock top of the Whanahuia Range. Relief workers in the 1930s cut the first track via a suspension bridge up to an old musterers' hut at 1,327 m (4,354 ft). It was expanded by Rangiwahia Ski Club, who were formed in 1935, and was rebuilt by Palmerston North Tramping and Mountaineering Club in 1967. The Department of Conservation hut was built in 1984. Bush in the area had been badly damaged by red deer and possums and the ski club had used an Indian motorbike engine, to drive a rope tow above the hut and bulldozed the tussock to smooth the slopes. After roads to Ruapehu had been improved, the ski club faded away in the 1950s, as Feilding skiers took to the more reliable snow. Deer culling and 1080 drops have helped wildlife recover.

=== Rangiwahia Scenic Reserve ===
The 130 acres (53 ha) Rangiwahia Scenic Reserve has two public tracks. This bush was left to the east of Rangiwahia for the village water supply. A dam remains, as does a concrete dam near the dairy factory. Wildlife includes maire, rimu, miro, mataī, kahikatea, tōtara, rewarewa, northern rātā, tree ferns, pīwakawaka, riroriro, kererū, tūī, korimako, miromiro, ruru, kōtare, pīpīwharauroa, silvereye, chaffinch, eastern rosella and kārearea. It also has Darwin's barberry, which DoC is trying to control.

=== Kaikawaka Scenic Reserve ===
Kaikawaka Scenic Reserve is 5.44 ha (13.4 acres), south of Rangiwahia, on Wairaki Street. Its vegetation includes kahikatea, mataī, rimu, maire, rewarewa, kōtukutuku, kāmahi, horoeka, whekī ponga, ponga and katote. The reserve is next door to Rangiwahia Cemetery.

== Roads ==
By 1881 Kimbolton Road had been cleared and metalled close the borders of the block, though in 1886 Pemberton was still over 10 mi (16 km) from a road able to take a horse-drawn dray. From there a 7 ft (2.1 m)-wide packhorse route was gradually improved. It took till 1893 to widen and metal the track to within half a mile of Rang!wahia. The road to the railway at Mangaweka was built in 1896. Rangiwahia was in the Kiwitea Road Board area. Road building was paid for by local rates, though the Immigration and Public Works Act of 1870 provided for a government contribution. Sealing wasn't completed until 2014.

=== Buses ===
By 1896 a daily coach ran from Feilding, covering the 36 mi (58 km) in 6hrs by 1907. From 1902 there was also a coach to Mangaweka. The Feilding route became a service car route in 1917, which continued until 1924. The car crashed into a tree in 1920. By 1928 a bus ran 3 days a week, taking 3hrs from Rangiwahia to Palmerston North.

== Church ==
Of the Catholic, Methodist and Anglican churches, only the 1903 St Barnabas Anglican church remains. St Anne's Catholic Church was built in 1925 and relocated to Greytown in the 1970s. The Methodist Church was built in 1895 and moved to Aokautere in 1988.
