= Kiwitea =

Settlement in Manawatū-Whanganui Region, New Zealand

- Interactive map of Kiwitea
- Country: New Zealand
- Region: Manawatū-Whanganui
- District: Manawatū District
- Ward: Manawatū Rural General Ward; Ngā Tapuae o Matangi Māori Ward
- Electorates: Rangitīkei; Te Tai Hauāuru (Māori)

Government
  - Territorial Authority: Manawatū District Council
  - Regional council: Horizons Regional Council
  - Mayor of Manawatu: Michael Ford
  - Rangitīkei MP: Suze Redmayne
  - Te Tai Hauāuru MP: Debbie Ngarewa-Packer

Area
  - Total: 45.36 km^{2} (17.51 sq mi)

Population (2023 Census)
  - Total: 132
  - Density: 2.91/km^{2} (7.54/sq mi)

Kiwitea is a village and rural community in the Manawatū District and Manawatū-Whanganui region in New Zealand's central North Island.

== History ==
Several European farmers bought freehold land in the area in the 1870s and 1800s and began settling it. They cleared dense standing forest, laid grass, subdivided it into paddocks for sheep and cattle, and built roads.

Alexander Perry, who was born in Wellington in 1852, purchased 900 acres in 1877. He died in 1894, leaving a large laid-out homestead to his two sons.

Thomas Taylor purchased 380 acres in 1877. He was contracted to provide supplies for building a railway through the area in the 1880s and took up positions on the road board, hospital board and farmer's alliance, but did not move to the area until 1889. Taylor who was born in Staffordshire, England in 1843, educated in Wolverhampton, armed in Birmingham, mined for gold on the West Coast, managed a large butchery in Fiji, and ran a store in Turakina before raising the money to purchase the Kiwitea site.

James Barrow, who was born in Johnsonville in 1852 and had been farming with his father in Pāuatahanui, purchased 300 acres in 1878.

William Morton, who was born in Yorkshire, England in 1848 and moved to Rangitikei in 1870, purchased 150 acres in 1882 and purchased another 220 acres in 1891. By 1897, he was farming about 700 sheep, 100 cattle and 20 milking cows for the local creamery, and was a member of the local council.

A school was established in the area in 1884. Schoolmaster Richard French, a native of King's County, Ireland and graduate of Trinity College, Dublin, arrived in 1886 and took over the school in 1890. A school house was built on an acre section in 1891.

In 1897, The Cyclopedia of New Zealand described Kiwitea as a "little settlement", four miles from the telegraph office in Cheltenham, and connected by daily coach trips to the nearest market town, Feilding.

The school had a roll of 40, and was "well ventilated" and "well conducted".

Mr. Foster's Store provided a daily mail service and general products. The owner was born in Devonport, England, settled in Foxton in 1874, and took over the store in 1893.

== Demographics ==
Kiwitea locality covers 45.36 km^{2} (17.51 sq mi). It is part of the larger Kiwitea statistical area.

Historical population for Kiwitea locality
Year	Pop.	±% p.a.
2006	129	—
2013	141	+1.28%
2018	138	−0.43%
2023	132	−0.89%

Kiwitea had a population of 132 in the 2023 New Zealand census, a decrease of 6 people (−4.3%) since the 2018 census, and a decrease of 9 people (−6.4%) since the 2013 census. There were 69 males and 63 females in 54 dwellings. The median age was 46.6 years (compared with 38.1 years nationally). There were 21 people (15.9%) aged under 15 years, 18 (13.6%) aged 15 to 29, 63 (47.7%) aged 30 to 64, and 30 (22.7%) aged 65 or older.

People could identify as more than one ethnicity. The results were 95.5% European (Pākehā), 9.1% Māori, and 2.3% Asian. English was spoken by 97.7%, Māori by 2.3%, and other languages by 4.5%. No language could be spoken by 2.3% (e.g. too young to talk). The percentage of people born overseas was 11.4, compared with 28.8% nationally.

Religious affiliations were 27.3% Christian, 2.3% Buddhist, and 2.3% New Age. People who answered that they had no religion were 61.4%, and 13.6% of people did not answer the census question.

Of those at least 15 years old, 24 (21.6%) people had a bachelor's or higher degree, 63 (56.8%) had a post-high school certificate or diploma, and 18 (16.2%) people exclusively held high school qualifications. The median income was $48,400, compared with $41,500 nationally. 6 people (5.4%) earned over $100,000 compared to 12.1% nationally. The employment status of those at least 15 was 69 (62.2%) full-time and 18 (16.2%) part-time.

=== Kiwitea statistical area ===
Kiwitea statistical area, which also includes Kimbolton and Rangiwahia and part of Cheltenham, covers 783.84 km^{2} (302.64 sq mi) and had an estimated population of 1,570 as of June 2025, with a population density of 2.0 people per km^{2}.

Historical population for the statistical area
Year	Pop.	±% p.a.
2006	1,410	—
2013	1,443	+0.33%
2018	1,515	+0.98%
2023	1,506	−0.12%

Kiwitea statistical area had a population of 1,506 in the 2023 New Zealand census, a decrease of 9 people (−0.6%) since the 2018 census, and an increase of 63 people (4.4%) since the 2013 census. There were 741 males, 765 females, and 3 people of other genders in 582 dwellings. 1.6% of people identified as LGBTIQ+. The median age was 43.3 years (compared with 38.1 years nationally). There were 288 people (19.1%) aged under 15 years, 243 (16.1%) aged 15 to 29, 729 (48.4%) aged 30 to 64, and 249 (16.5%) aged 65 or older.

People could identify as more than one ethnicity. The results were 90.2% European (Pākehā); 15.1% Māori; 0.6% Pasifika; 2.6% Asian; 0.4% Middle Eastern, Latin American and African New Zealanders (MELAA); and 4.8% other, which includes people giving their ethnicity as "New Zealander". English was spoken by 98.2%, Māori by 2.4%, Samoan by 0.2%, and other languages by 4.0%. No language could be spoken by 1.4% (e.g. too young to talk). New Zealand Sign Language was known by 0.6%. The percentage of people born overseas was 10.6, compared with 28.8% nationally.

Religious affiliations were 30.1% Christian, 0.6% Hindu, 0.2% Māori religious beliefs, 0.2% Buddhist, 0.6% New Age, and 0.6% other religions. People who answered that they had no religion were 59.2%, and 8.6% of people did not answer the census question.

Of those at least 15 years old, 228 (18.7%) people had a bachelor's or higher degree, 708 (58.1%) had a post-high school certificate or diploma, and 288 (23.6%) people exclusively held high school qualifications. The median income was $41,000, compared with $41,500 nationally. 108 people (8.9%) earned over $100,000 compared to 12.1% nationally. The employment status of those at least 15 was 711 (58.4%) full-time, 192 (15.8%) part-time, and 21 (1.7%) unemployed.

== Education ==
Kiwitea School is a co-educational state primary school for Year 1 to 8 students, with a roll of 64 as of July 2026.

The school tripled its roll between 2017 and 2019. This bucked a long-term trend: three of the seven local schools had closed between 2014 and 2019.

As of 2019, students from Feilding made up a quarter of the school's roll, with many parents preferring the open country atmosphere.

The annual Lamb and Calf Day is a long tradition at Kiwitea School, featuring lamb, calf and vegetable sculpting competitions. In recent years it has been expanded into a Pet Day, allowing students to bring other pets including cats and dogs to school.
