= Makino Road railway station =

Defunct railway station in New Zealand

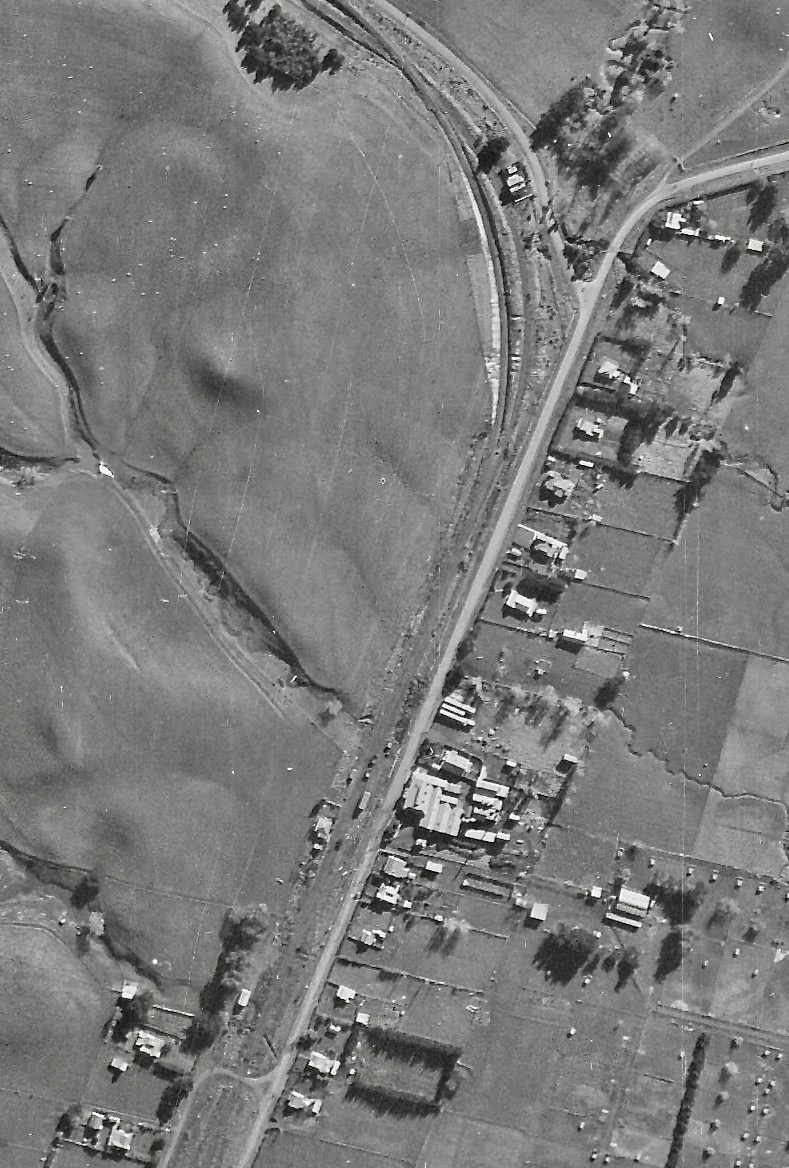
- Makino railway station in 1942

General information
- Location: New Zealand
- Coordinates: 40.198739°S 175.568654°E
- Elevation: 103 m (338 ft)
- Line: North Island Main Trunk
- Distance: Wellington 156.25 km (97.09 mi)

History
- Opened: 17 December 1879
- Closed: 10 August 1959
- Electrified: June 1988

Services
Preceding station	Historical railways	Following station
Maewa; Line open, station closed 2.36 km (1.47 mi)	North Island Main Trunk; KiwiRail	Feilding; Line open, station closed 3.3 km (2.1 mi)
Location

Makino Road (or Makino) railway station was a station on the North Island Main Trunk in New Zealand. It was a request stop, 49 mi (79 km) south of Wanganui and 2 mi (3.2 km) north of Feilding.

The station opened after 17 December 1878 and closed on Monday 10 August 1959 for goods, except private siding traffic (though it was closed for passengers by October 1955).

In 1981 it was also known as Makino Siding.

== History ==
Trains started to run on the line when the Feilding – Halcombe Section opened on Monday 22 April 1878. There was a siding, but it wasn't until 17 December 1878 that a passenger platform was proposed at the siding. There was a post office at the station from 1 May 1879 (possibly when the station opened) until 1880.

In 1896 the Post & Telegraph Department suggested a name change to avoid the post office being mistaken for Makuri, or Maheno. “Macarthur” and “Pekanga” were proposed, but it was decided to keep Makino.

By 1895 there were cattle yards and by 1896 the station had a shelter shed, passenger platform, 36 ft (11 m) by 11 ft (3.4 m) goods shed, loading bank, crane and a passing loop for 19 wagons. A year later there was also a water service, stationmaster's house and urinals. A Railways worker house was constructed at the station in the 1920s. A telephone was connected in 1930. From 1931 until closure in 1959 there was a caretaker at the station. In 1960 the loading bank and goods shed were removed. By 1964 the north end main line points had been removed, though a shelter shed and passenger platform remained in 1970. In 1981 the private siding to Pritchard Potatoes Ltd was closed.
