= Aorangi railway station =

Defunct railway station in New Zealand

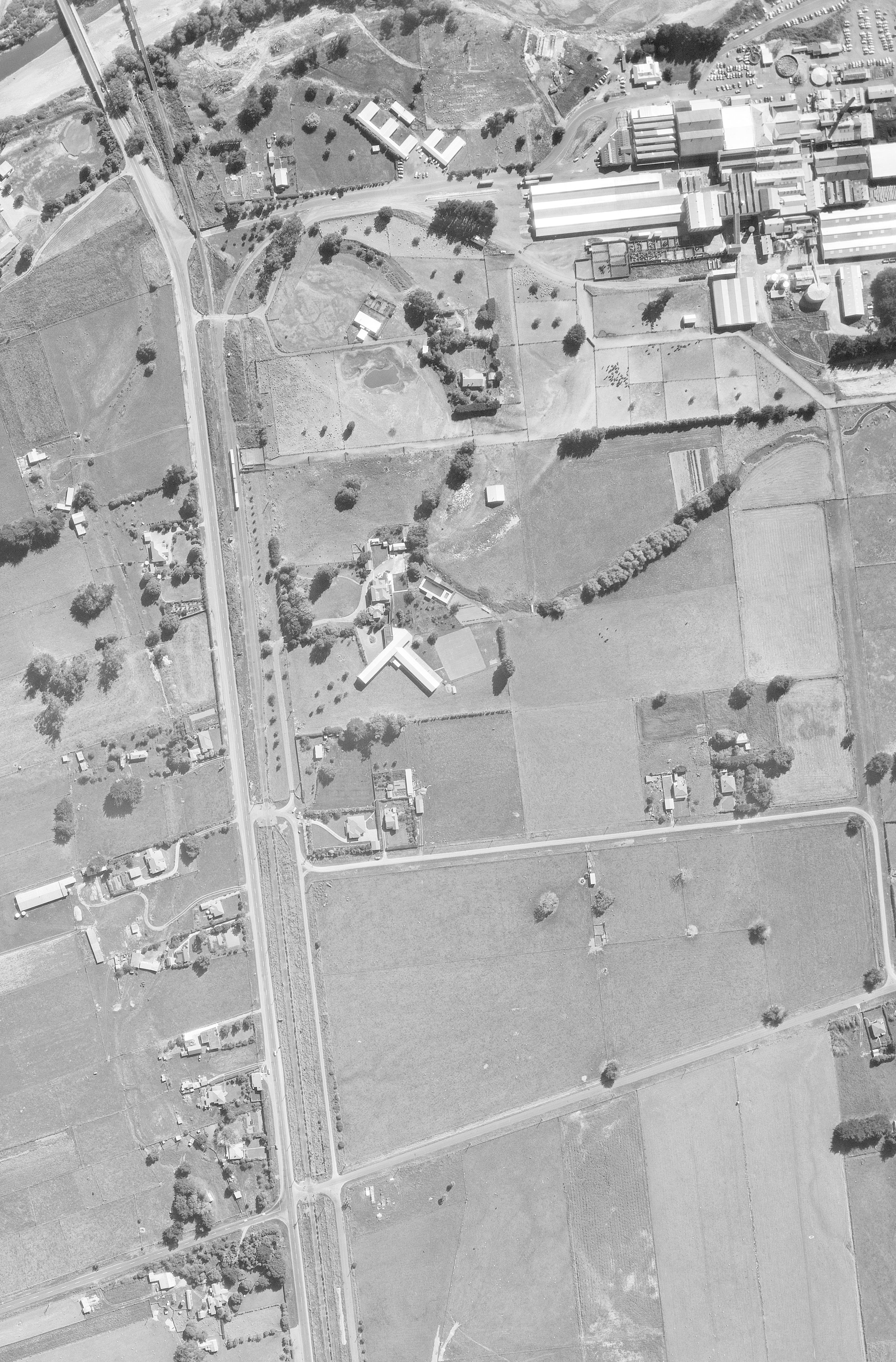
- Aorangi in 1967, showing the bridge over the Oroua, meat works, sidings and possible site of station shelter

General information
- Location: New Zealand
- Coordinates: 40.243305°S 175.585032°E
- Elevation: 70 m (230 ft)
- Owner: KiwiRail
- Line: North Island Main Trunk
- Distance: Wellington 150.9 km (93.8 mi)
- Platforms: 1

History
- Opened: 1 October 1876
- Closed: 2 November 1987
- Electrified: 25 kV 50 Hz AC June 1988

Services
Preceding station	Historical railways	Following station
Feilding; Line open, station closed 2.05 km (1.27 mi)	North Island Main Trunk; KiwiRail	Taonui; Line open, station closed 3.17 km (1.97 mi)
Location

Aorangi railway station was a small station on the North Island Main Trunk in New Zealand.

The station was opened in 1878; and closed on 10 August 1959 for passengers and 2 November 1987 for goods traffic. There is now only a single line through the station site. Te Araroa long distance walkway passes the station site.

== History ==
By July 1876 the rails were in place, linking Palmerston North and Feilding, and ballasting was finished in September. The formal opening of the railway was on 19 October 1876. Charles Bull had a sawmill at Aorangi until about 1886. It had a private siding 4 chains (260 ft; 80 m) on the Feilding side of Aorangi from 1878, but there was a complaint about trains not stopping for passengers in 1883. By 1896 there was a shelter shed and passenger platform and also a cart approach by 1911.

By 1959 there was still a shelter, platform and Borthwicks' private siding, which was the only source of local rail traffic after closure of the station on 10 August 1959. A 1949 aerial photo seems to show a shelter, where the 1967 photo (to the right) shows a white mark at the foot of the photo. In 1989 there was still a passing loop and private siding.

== Aorangi Bridge ==
The railway crosses the Oroua River between Aorangi and Feilding on Aorangi Bridge, which was rebuilt in 1930-31, when the curve was eased from a radius of 14 chains (920 ft; 280 m) to 20 ch (1,300 ft; 400 m). It has ten 20 ch (1,300 ft; 400 m) 60 feet (18 m) spans, with a total length of 183 m (600 ft).

A footbridge over the river was built in 1883. The first road bridge opened on 21 March 1893. It was replaced by a ferro-concrete bridge in 1930.

The road and railway bridges were partly swept away in a flood on 17 April 1897.

== Freezing works ==
A siding for the Oroua Freezing works was put in during its construction in 1915. West Coast Meat & Produce Co Ltd had the works formally opened by Prime Minister, Bill Massey, on 17 April 1916. Later that year the company changed its name to Feilding Farmers’ Freezing Company Ltd. They sold the works to Thomas Borthwick and Sons (Australasia) Ltd in 1931, who had a small shunting locomotive at Aorangi from 1931 to 1973. Rail traffic was reduced in 1944 by allowing road haulage for up to 20 mi (32 km) parallel with the railway. The works became part of AFFCO from May 1992, after re-building in September 1991. The works is no longer rail connected.
