= Āpiti =

Town in Manawatū-Whanganui, New Zealand

- Settlement
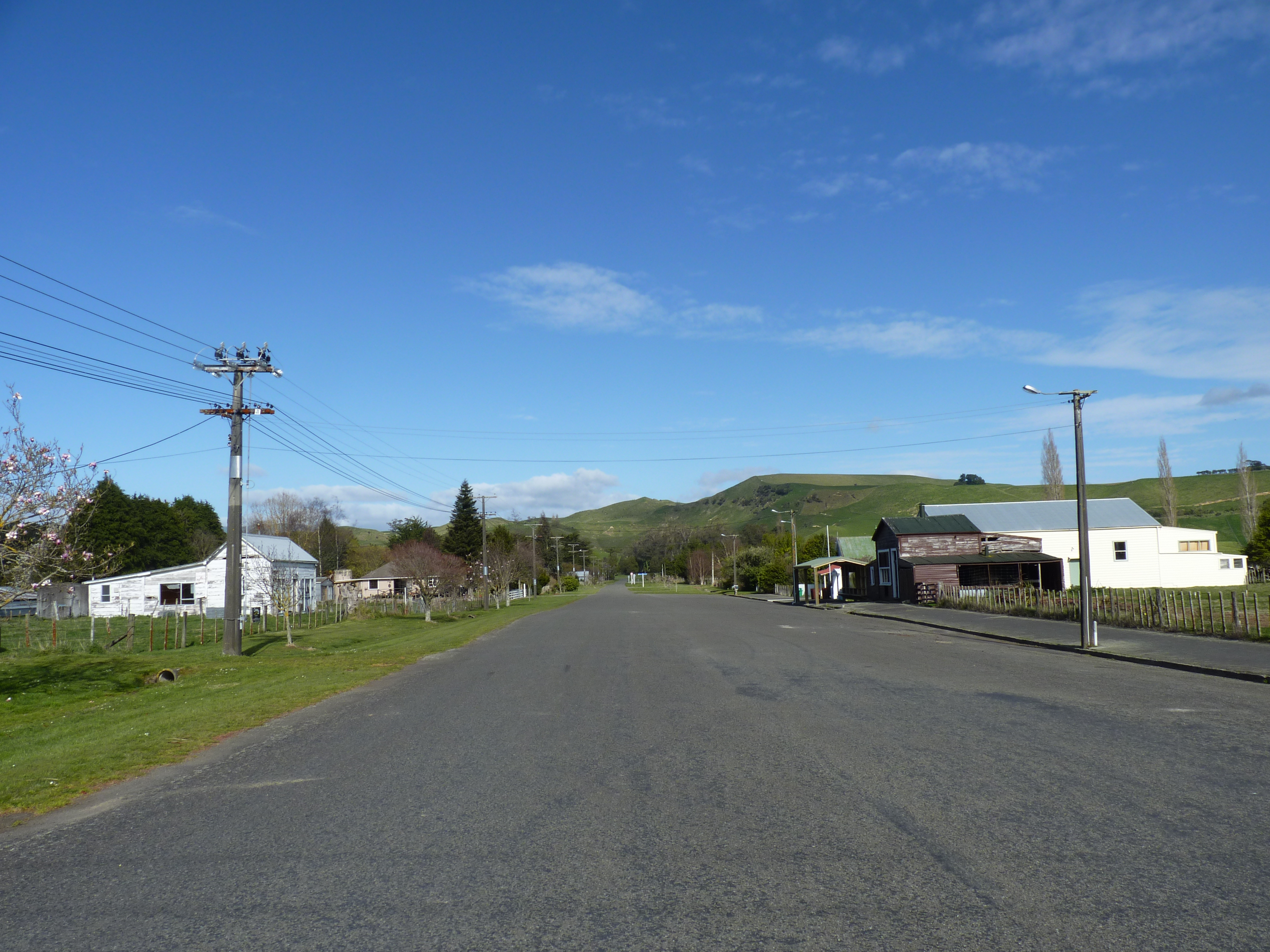
- Āpiti village in 2011
- Interactive map of Āpiti
- Coordinates: 39°58′20″S 175°52′20″E
- Country: New Zealand
- Region: Manawatū-Whanganui
- District: Manawatū District
- Ward: Manawatū Rural General Ward; Ngā Tapuae o Matangi Māori Ward
- Electorates: Rangitīkei; Te Tai Hauāuru (Māori)

Government
  - Territorial Authority: Manawatū District Council
  - Regional council: Horizons Regional Council
  - Mayor of Manawatu: Michael Ford
  - Rangitīkei MP: Suze Redmayne
  - Te Tai Hauāuru MP: Debbie Ngarewa-Packer

Area
  - Total: 161.84 km^{2} (62.49 sq mi)

Population (2023 Census)
  - Total: 192
  - Density: 1.19/km^{2} (3.07/sq mi)

Āpiti is a small township in the North Island of New Zealand. It is located to the northeast of the small town of Kimbolton in the Manawatū-Whanganui region. It is located on a small plain, the Āpiti Flats, close to the valley and gorge of the Oroua River, near Rangiwahia and close to the foot of the Ruahine Range.

Āpiti was settled in 1886. Although its industry has historically always been pastoral farming, it is now also known by tourists and trampers as a gateway to the Ruahine Range. In the 1890s it gained a school, a hall and a dairy factory. When a road was built and a bridge across the Oroua River in 1896, the town developed with several shops and services. A post office opened in 1889 and closed from 5 February 1988 when Postmaster-General, Richard Prebble, closed or reduced 580 offices.

In July 2020, the name of the locality was officially gazetted as Āpiti by the New Zealand Geographic Board.

== Demographics ==
Āpiti locality covers 161.84 km^{2} (62.49 sq mi). It is part of the larger Pohangina-Apiti statistical area.

Historical population
Year	Pop.	±% p.a.
2006	177	—
2013	198	+1.61%
2018	228	+2.86%
2023	192	−3.38%

Āpiti had a population of 192 in the 2023 New Zealand census, a decrease of 36 people (−15.8%) since the 2018 census, and a decrease of 6 people (−3.0%) since the 2013 census. There were 99 males and 99 females in 75 dwellings. 1.6% of people identified as LGBTIQ+. There were 42 people (21.9%) aged under 15 years, 27 (14.1%) aged 15 to 29, 96 (50.0%) aged 30 to 64, and 27 (14.1%) aged 65 or older.

People could identify as more than one ethnicity. The results were 98.4% European (Pākehā), 10.9% Māori, and 6.2% other, which includes people giving their ethnicity as "New Zealander". English was spoken by 100.0%, Māori by 1.6%, and other languages by 3.1%. The percentage of people born overseas was 9.4, compared with 28.8% nationally.

Religious affiliations were 12.5% Christian, and 3.1% other religions. People who answered that they had no religion were 81.2%, and 6.2% of people did not answer the census question.

Of those at least 15 years old, 15 (10.0%) people had a bachelor's or higher degree, 99 (66.0%) had a post-high school certificate or diploma, and 39 (26.0%) people exclusively held high school qualifications. 12 people (8.0%) earned over $100,000 compared to 12.1% nationally. The employment status of those at least 15 was 84 (56.0%) full-time, 21 (14.0%) part-time, and 9 (6.0%) unemployed.

== Education ==
Āpiti School is a co-educational state primary school, with a roll of 14 as of July 2026. The school opened about 1892. Apiti District High School opened about 1937 and had new buildings and a swimming pool added in 1941. The high school continued into the 1950s.
