= Pohangina =

Settlement in Manawatū-Whanganui Region, New Zealand

- Village
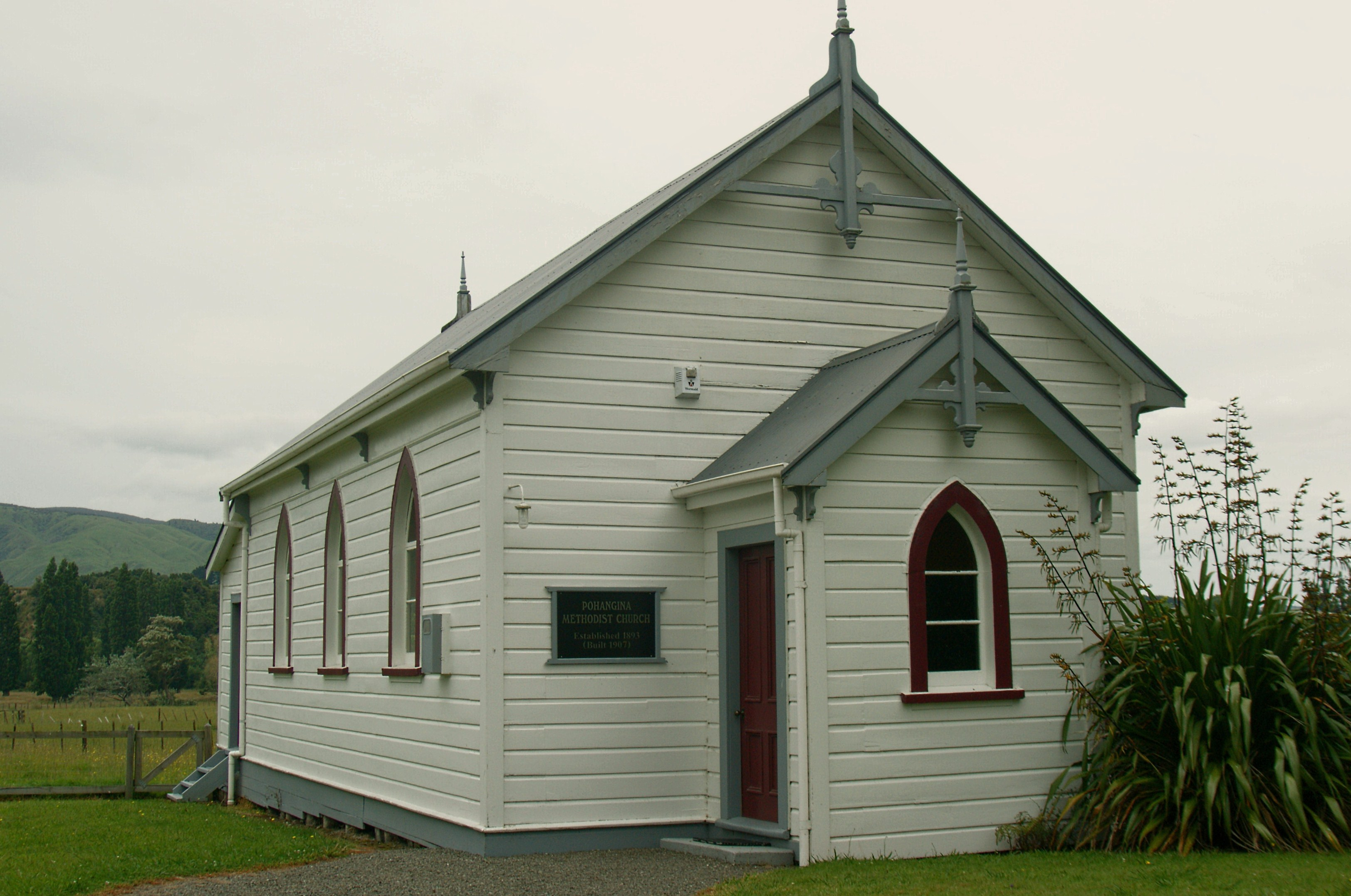
- Pohangina Methodist Church, built c. 1907
- Interactive map of Pohangina
- Coordinates: 40°10′S 175°48′E
- Country: New Zealand
- Region: Manawatū-Whanganui
- District: Manawatū District
- Ward: Manawatū Rural General Ward; Ngā Tapuae o Matangi Māori Ward
- Electorates: Rangitīkei; Te Tai Hauāuru (Māori)

Government
  - Territorial Authority: Manawatū District Council
  - Regional council: Horizons Regional Council
  - Mayor of Manawatu: Michael Ford
  - Rangitīkei MP: Suze Redmayne
  - Te Tai Hauāuru MP: Debbie Ngarewa-Packer

Area
  - Total: 5.81 km^{2} (2.24 sq mi)

Population (June 2025)
  - Total: 230
  - Density: 40/km^{2} (100/sq mi)

Pohangina is a small rural community in the Manawatū-Whanganui region of New Zealand, just north of Ashhurst.

Pohangina is located along the foot of the Ruahine Range, and is primarily farming land. Farming varies from sheep and cattle to crops of maize and 'chow'. The farmland was originally ancient native forest. Rimu and northern rātā grew above 1000 feet, with kāmahi, kaikawaka and pink pine growing at higher and steeper slopes, leatherwood scrub growing at higher altitudes, and wild tussocks growing at the summits of the range.

The area still includes many conservation areas, including the Totara Reserve camping ground, the Pohangina River, Pohangina Wetlands reserve, and Pohangina Base, a former DOC field centre in the Ruahine Forest Park.

Pohangina includes a village, with several historical buildings, including a small chapel and at community hall built in 1933. The area is a fishing spot for brown trout and rainbow trout.

Pohangina translates as "ulcerated night", possibly suggesting the valley had been a place of bloodshed between the local Rangitāne Māori people and their enemies. However, the name is a corruption of the proper form, "Pou hangina", so is likely to reference posts or supports, metaphoric or physical.

== Demographics ==
Pohangina is described by Stats NZ as a rural settlement. It covers 5.81 km^{2} (2.24 sq mi) and had an estimated population of 230 as of June 2025, with a population density of 40 people per km^{2}. It is part of the larger Pohangina-Apiti statistical area.

Historical population for Pohangina
Year	Pop.	±% p.a.
2006	186	—
2013	186	+0.00%
2018	210	+2.46%
2023	225	+1.39%

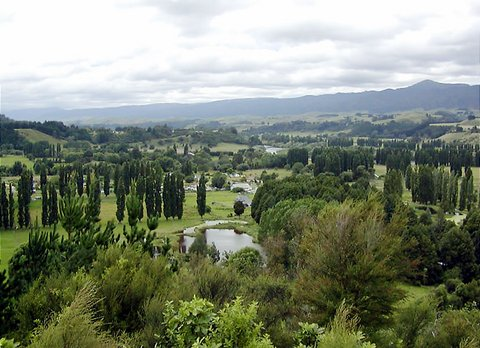
Pohangina Valley

Pohangina had a population of 225 in the 2023 New Zealand census, an increase of 15 people (7.1%) since the 2018 census, and an increase of 39 people (21.0%) since the 2013 census. There were 108 males, 114 females, and 3 people of other genders in 87 dwellings. 5.3% of people identified as LGBTIQ+. The median age was 49.9 years (compared with 38.1 years nationally). There were 42 people (18.7%) aged under 15 years, 30 (13.3%) aged 15 to 29, 111 (49.3%) aged 30 to 64, and 42 (18.7%) aged 65 or older.

People could identify as more than one ethnicity. The results were 94.7% European (Pākehā), 16.0% Māori, 1.3% Pasifika, 2.7% Asian, and 2.7% other, which includes people giving their ethnicity as "New Zealander". English was spoken by 97.3%, Māori by 2.7%, and other languages by 4.0%. No language could be spoken by 2.7% (e.g. too young to talk). New Zealand Sign Language was known by 1.3%. The percentage of people born overseas was 21.3, compared with 28.8% nationally.

Religious affiliations were 22.7% Christian, 1.3% Māori religious beliefs, 1.3% Buddhist, and 2.7% other religions. People who answered that they had no religion were 60.0%, and 12.0% of people did not answer the census question.

Of those at least 15 years old, 63 (34.4%) people had a bachelor's or higher degree, 102 (55.7%) had a post-high school certificate or diploma, and 18 (9.8%) people exclusively held high school qualifications. The median income was $44,900, compared with $41,500 nationally. 36 people (19.7%) earned over $100,000 compared to 12.1% nationally. The employment status of those at least 15 was 93 (50.8%) full-time, 30 (16.4%) part-time, and 3 (1.6%) unemployed.

=== Pohangina-Apiti statistical area ===
Pohangina-Apiti statistical area, which also includes Āpiti, covers 681.60 km^{2} (263.17 sq mi) and had an estimated population of 1,330 as of June 2025, with a population density of 2.0 people per km^{2}.

Historical population for Pohangina-Apiti
Year	Pop.	±% p.a.
2006	1,065	—
2013	1,095	+0.40%
2018	1,227	+2.30%
2023	1,290	+1.01%

Pohangina-Apiti had a population of 1,290 in the 2023 New Zealand census, an increase of 63 people (5.1%) since the 2018 census, and an increase of 195 people (17.8%) since the 2013 census. There were 627 males, 654 females, and 9 people of other genders in 501 dwellings. 2.6% of people identified as LGBTIQ+. The median age was 44.7 years (compared with 38.1 years nationally). There were 243 people (18.8%) aged under 15 years, 162 (12.6%) aged 15 to 29, 675 (52.3%) aged 30 to 64, and 207 (16.0%) aged 65 or older.

People could identify as more than one ethnicity. The results were 96.0% European (Pākehā); 11.6% Māori; 0.9% Pasifika; 0.7% Asian; 0.2% Middle Eastern, Latin American and African New Zealanders (MELAA); and 4.2% other, which includes people giving their ethnicity as "New Zealander". English was spoken by 98.6%, Māori by 3.3%, Samoan by 0.2%, and other languages by 4.4%. No language could be spoken by 1.4% (e.g. too young to talk). New Zealand Sign Language was known by 0.7%. The percentage of people born overseas was 14.9, compared with 28.8% nationally.

Religious affiliations were 24.4% Christian, 0.7% Māori religious beliefs, 0.2% Buddhist, 0.5% New Age, and 1.6% other religions. People who answered that they had no religion were 64.0%, and 8.8% of people did not answer the census question.

Of those at least 15 years old, 291 (27.8%) people had a bachelor's or higher degree, 582 (55.6%) had a post-high school certificate or diploma, and 174 (16.6%) people exclusively held high school qualifications. The median income was $44,400, compared with $41,500 nationally. 144 people (13.8%) earned over $100,000 compared to 12.1% nationally. The employment status of those at least 15 was 576 (55.0%) full-time, 189 (18.1%) part-time, and 15 (1.4%) unemployed.

== Education ==
Awahou School is a co-educational state primary school for Year 1 to 8 students, with a roll of 40 as of July 2026. It opened in 1894.
