= Hinerangitoariari =

Māori artist

Hinerangitoariari (Winifred Margaret Belcher, née Foley; born 1950) is a Māori artist.

Born in Feilding, Hinerangitoariari is of Māori (Te Arawa, Uenuku-Kōpako, Ngāti Pikiao, Ngāti Whakaue) and Irish descent.

== Art ==
Hinerangitoariari is best known for her 8m long mural Karanga which was commissioned for and installed in the Aotea Centre on public view between 1990 and 2003. Intricately detailed, the painting features 12 major groupings of birds arranged to depict the 12 notes of a chromatic scale. Intertwined among birds and trees are aspects of Māori folklore based on the legends of Tāne. Hinerangitoariari worked on the painting for 10 months.

In 1992, Hinerangitoariari was named Palmerston North's first artist in residence as part of the Te Marae o Hine residency programme. Her project for this residency was entitled The 12 Heavens, and built on the thematic imagery of Karanga.

In 2003, Karanga was moved into storage due to an upgrade of the convention centre. The custodial owners of the work Karanga are Ngāti Whātua, and in 2005 the University of Auckland Faculty of Engineering secured a loan of the artwork and displayed it in the School of Engineering main foyer. Hinerangitoariari's brother is a graduate of the Faculty of Engineering.

=== Group shows ===
Whenua Ora / Upon the Land at Waikato Museum, 2015.

Te Karohirohinga Taonga, Māori art from the Community at Waikato Museum, 1995. Hinerangitoariari exhibited four works on a creation theme - Io, Whero, Nga Wha and Tane.

Kohia ko Taikaka Anake at the National Art Gallery, 1990. At the time, this was the largest exhibition of Māori art to date.

== Personal life ==
Hinerangitoariari was born in the power substation village of Bunnythorpe, and her father Alf Foley was a generation engineer. The nearby Mangahao Power Station was built in the same year her father was born - 1924. In 2003, Hinerangitoariari moved to Mangaore Village, close to where she grew up.
