= Thomas Borthwick & Sons (Australasia) Ltd v South Otago Freezing Co Ltd =

1978 legal case in New Zealand

- Court: Court of Appeal of New Zealand
- Full case name: Thomas Borthwick & Sons (Australasia) Ltd v South Otago Freezing Co Ltd
- Decided: 21 December 1977
- Citation: [1978] 1 NZLR 538

Court membership
- Judges sitting: Richmond P, Woodhouse, Cooke

Thomas Borthwick & Sons (Australasia) Ltd v South Otago Freezing Co Ltd [1978] 1 NZLR 538 is a cited case in New Zealand regarding the remedy of an injunction for a breach of contract.
