= Feilding railway station =

Railway station in Feilding, New Zealand

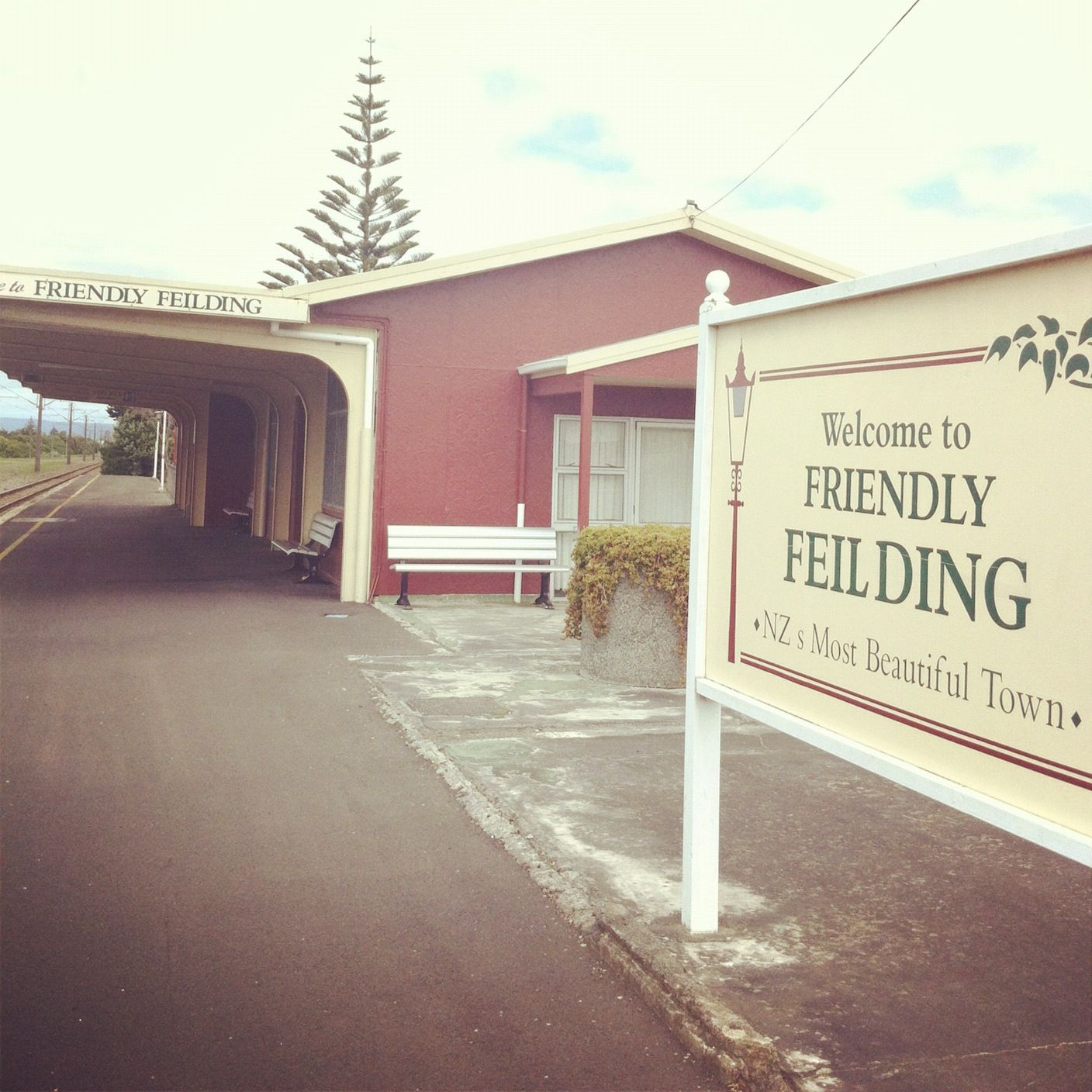
- Feilding railway station

General information
- Location: New Zealand
- Coordinates: 40.226472°S 175.568784°E
- Elevation: 72 m (236 ft)
- Line: North Island Main Trunk
- Distance: Wellington 152.95 km (95.04 mi)

History
- Opened: 1 October 1876
- Closed: 25 June 2012
- Rebuilt: 7 December 1961 after fire
- Electrified: 24 June 1988

Services
| Preceding station | Historical railways | Following station |
|---|---|---|
| Makino Road; Line open, station closed 3.3 km (2.1 mi) | North Island Main Trunk; KiwiRail | Aorangi; Line open, station closed 2.05 km (1.27 mi) |
Location
- Location within New Zealand

Feilding railway station was a station on the North Island Main Trunk line in Feilding, New Zealand. It was opened on 1 October 1876 and closed on 25 June 2012. The station is now used by an occasional excursion train.

The south wall of the station is decorated with a mural, which features Feilding's 1999 clock tower, which has a 1902 clock. The nearby former goods shed has a mural depicting the X Class loco stored at Feilding. The murals were by Eric Brew, who was a resident artist and painted many other murals in the town.

Feilding had hoped to be the junction of the North Island Main Trunk and the Marton–New Plymouth line so had made Kimbolton Road exceptionally wide, but that honour went to Marton.

== History ==
J & C Bull built a 5th class station with platform, goods shed, privies and urinals by 28 April 1876. By July 1876 the rails were in place, linking Palmerston North and Feilding, and ballasting was finished in September. Two platelayers' cottages and a stationmaster's house were built by Burgess & Thompson in 1877 and a ladies waiting room in 1878. By 1896 there was also a passing loop for 19 wagons, cart approach, loading bank and cattle yards and the goods shed was 103 ft (31 m) by 31 ft (9.4 m), with a crane and a verandah added in 1897. By 1900 the goods shed was 153 ft (47 m) by 42 ft (13 m). In 1973 a 190 ft (58 m) wool loading shelter replaced an earlier one.

The contract for the extension north from Feilding to the Rangitīkei River was let on 28 June 1876. The line was extended to Halcombe from 22 April 1878, thus linking the ports of Foxton and Whanganui to their hinterland.

Feilding gas works opened in 1897 and gas lamps were added to the station in 1901. Electric lighting came on 25 January 1916, after the local power station opened in 1915.

Sawmillers Manson & Bartholomew, later known as Feilding Sash and Door Co, had a tramway link to the railway from 1877 until at least 1916.

A new 138 ft (42 m) by 34 ft (10 m) station, built by Graham Lambert Builders for £27,000, opened on Thursday, 7 December 1961 to replace the old one, burnt down on 29 July 1960.In part of the building was demolished in 1988 after another fire.

A foot bridge was erected over the railway in 1900, allowing pedestrians to cross between opposing sides of Eyre Street. This was relocated to Makino Park in 1978, where it remains today.

=== Services ===
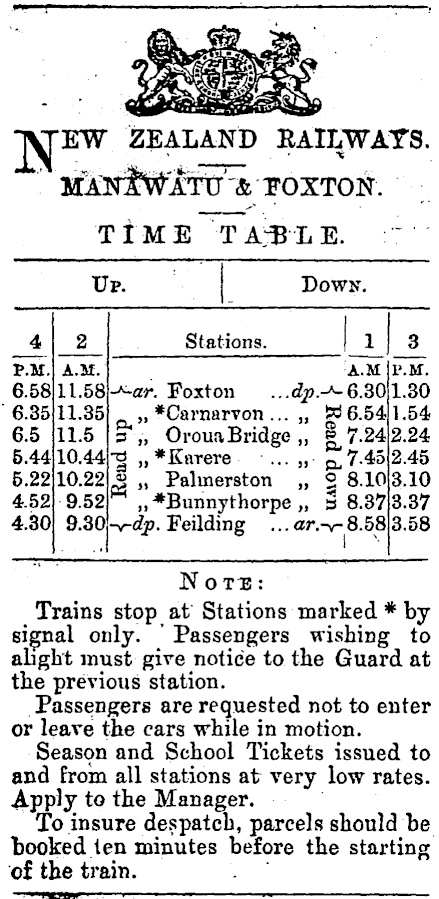
January 1877 Foxton Feilding timetable

Initially Feilding was served by two trains a day from Foxton.

The first Foxton-Whanganui train on Thursday 18 April 1878 took 6½ hours. The through public service began on 20 May 1878 with two trains a day each way, taking 5hrs 50mins for the 86 mi (138 km) journey.

The first Auckland - Wellington through expresses ran on 14 February 1909, taking 19 hours 13 minutes, and stopping at Feilding. From then on, Feilding was often one of the calls made by the expresses during the night. For example, in 1932, the express from Auckland arrived at 4.20am.

In the 1970s trains calling at Feilding were the Blue Streak and Northerner.

Feilding closed to regular passenger trains when the Overlander was replaced by the Northern Explorer in 2012.

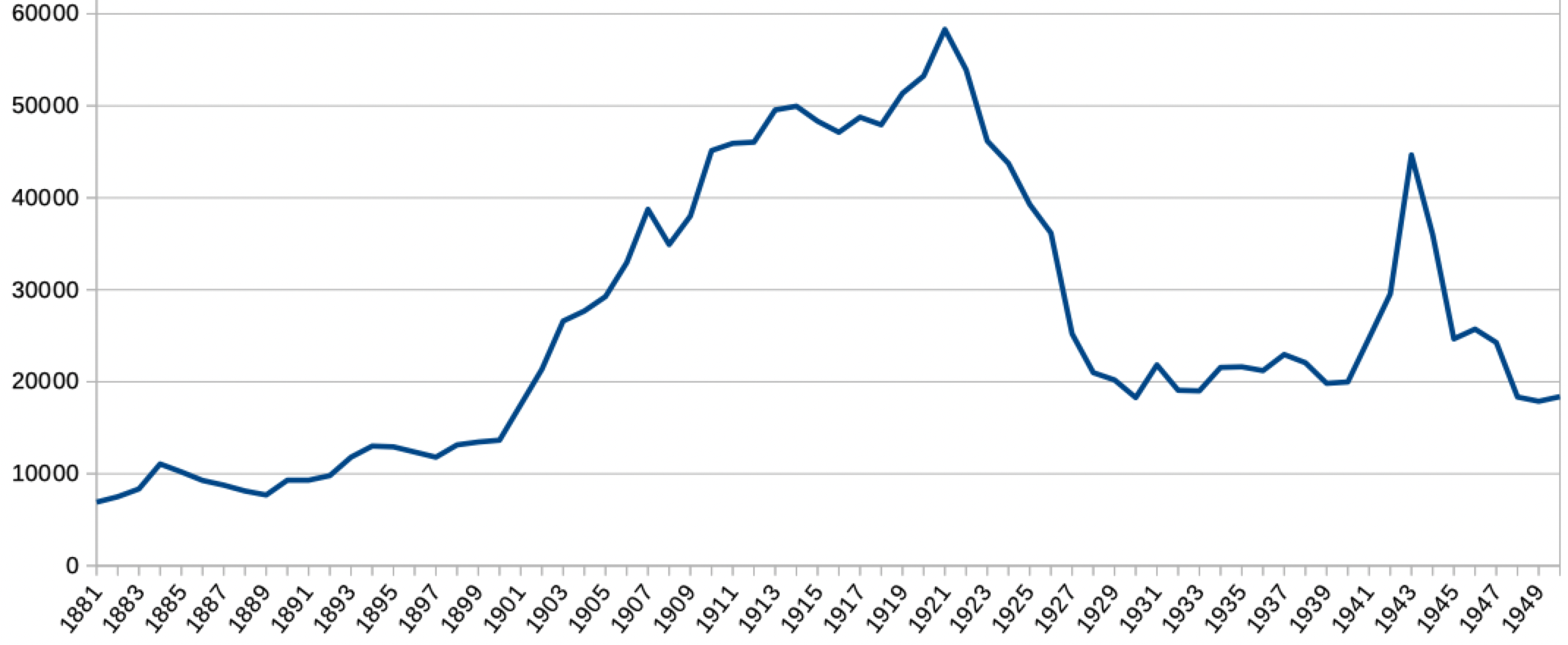
tickets sales 1881–1950 – derived from annual returns to Parliament of "Statement of Revenue for each Station for the Year ended"

== See also ==
- Feilding and District Steam Rail Society
