= Kimbolton, New Zealand =

Settlement in Manawatū-Whanganui Region, New Zealand

Kimbolton
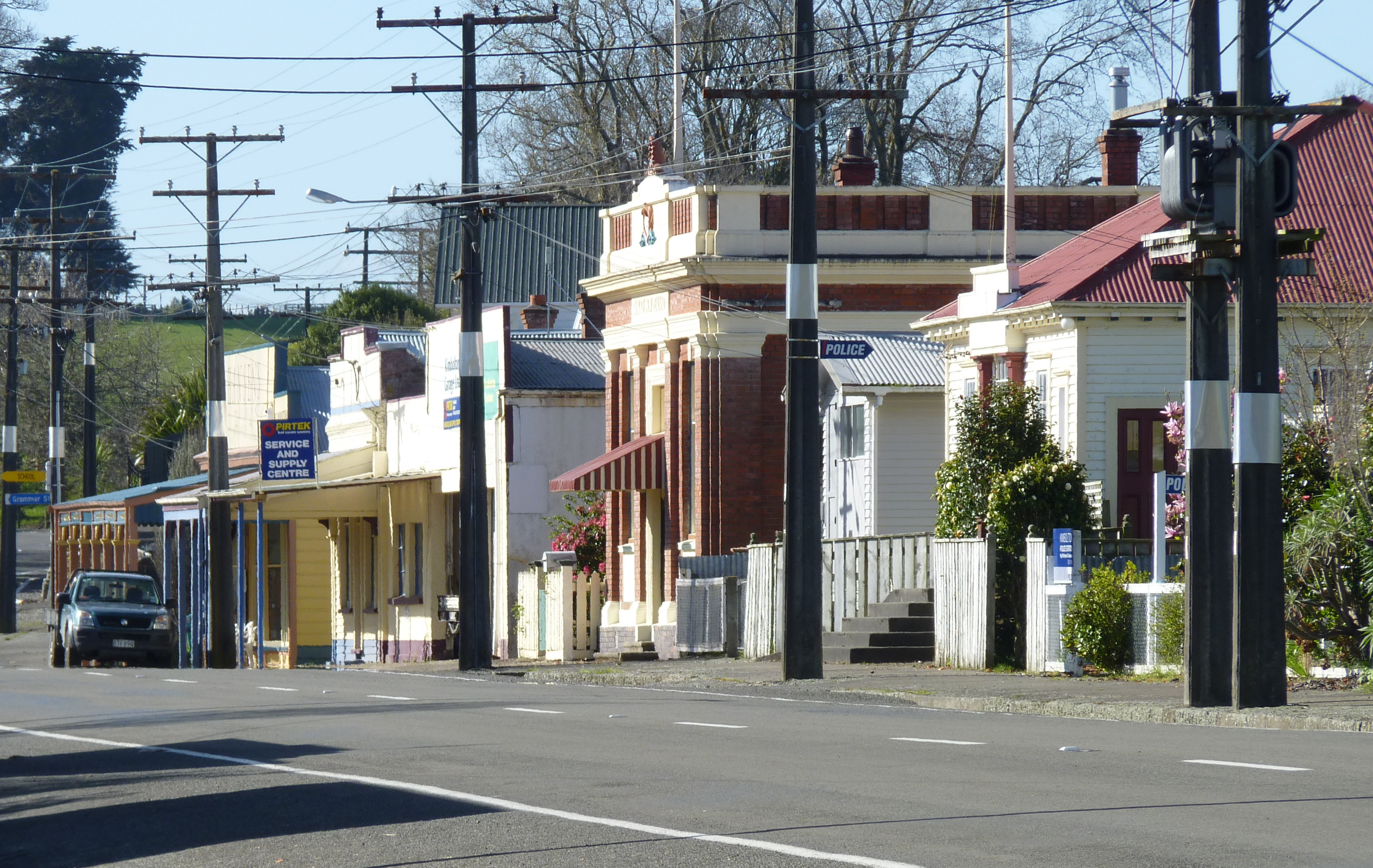
- Main street in Kimbolton
- Interactive map of Kimbolton
- Coordinates: 40.057°S 175.780°E
- Country: New Zealand
- Region: Manawatū-Whanganui
- District: Manawatū District
- Ward: Manawatū Rural General Ward; Ngā Tapuae o Matangi Māori Ward
- Electorates: Rangitīkei; Te Tai Hauāuru (Māori)

Government
  - Territorial Authority: Manawatū District Council
  - Regional council: Horizons Regional Council
  - Mayor of Manawatu: Michael Ford
  - Rangitīkei MP: Suze Redmayne
  - Te Tai Hauāuru MP: Debbie Ngarewa-Packer

Area
  - Total: 1.32 km^{2} (0.51 sq mi)

Population (June 2025)
  - Total: 240
  - Density: 180/km^{2} (470/sq mi)

Kimbolton is a rural village north of Feilding in the Manawatū District of the North Island of New Zealand. Kimbolton is named after Kimbolton, Cambridgeshire, a village in England which is the site of Kimbolton Castle, once the home of the Duke of Manchester. It was originally called Birmingham, after Birmingham, England.

The soil and climate in the area is ideal for rhododendrons and there are two rhododendron gardens in the area, including the former garden of the New Zealand Rhododendron Association, which was largely built by John Stuart Yeates, now called Heritage Park.

Amenities in the town include a cafe, a bowling green, a native reserve, and a rugby ground.

The small farming settlement of Āpiti lies 15km northeast of Kimbolton.

== Demographics ==
Kimbolton is described by Statistics New Zealand as a rural settlement. It covers 1.32 km^{2} (0.51 sq mi) and had an estimated population of 240 as of June 2025, with a population density of 182 people per km^{2}. It is part of the larger Kiwitea statistical area.

Historical population
Year	Pop.	±% p.a.
2006	198	—
2013	204	+0.43%
2018	228	+2.25%
2023	234	+0.52%

Kimbolton had a population of 234 in the 2023 New Zealand census, an increase of 6 people (2.6%) since the 2018 census, and an increase of 30 people (14.7%) since the 2013 census. There were 108 males and 123 females in 99 dwellings. 1.3% of people identified as LGBTIQ+. The median age was 54.2 years (compared with 38.1 years nationally). There were 30 people (12.8%) aged under 15 years, 30 (12.8%) aged 15 to 29, 117 (50.0%) aged 30 to 64, and 57 (24.4%) aged 65 or older.

People could identify as more than one ethnicity. The results were 89.7% European (Pākehā); 15.4% Māori; 1.3% Pasifika; 1.3% Asian; 2.6% Middle Eastern, Latin American and African New Zealanders (MELAA); and 5.1% other, which includes people giving their ethnicity as "New Zealander". English was spoken by 97.4%, Māori by 3.8%, and other languages by 3.8%. The percentage of people born overseas was 15.4, compared with 28.8% nationally.

Religious affiliations were 28.2% Christian, 1.3% Māori religious beliefs, and 1.3% other religions. People who answered that they had no religion were 59.0%, and 10.3% of people did not answer the census question.

Of those at least 15 years old, 39 (19.1%) people had a bachelor's or higher degree, 111 (54.4%) had a post-high school certificate or diploma, and 51 (25.0%) people exclusively held high school qualifications. The median income was $32,000, compared with $41,500 nationally. 15 people (7.4%) earned over $100,000 compared to 12.1% nationally. The employment status of those at least 15 was 90 (44.1%) full-time, 30 (14.7%) part-time, and 6 (2.9%) unemployed.

== Education ==
Kimbolton School is a co-educational state primary school for Year 1 to 8 students, with a roll of 47 as of July 2026. It opened in 1889.
