= Manawatū District =

Territorial authority district in New Zealand

Manawatu District
- Territorial authority district
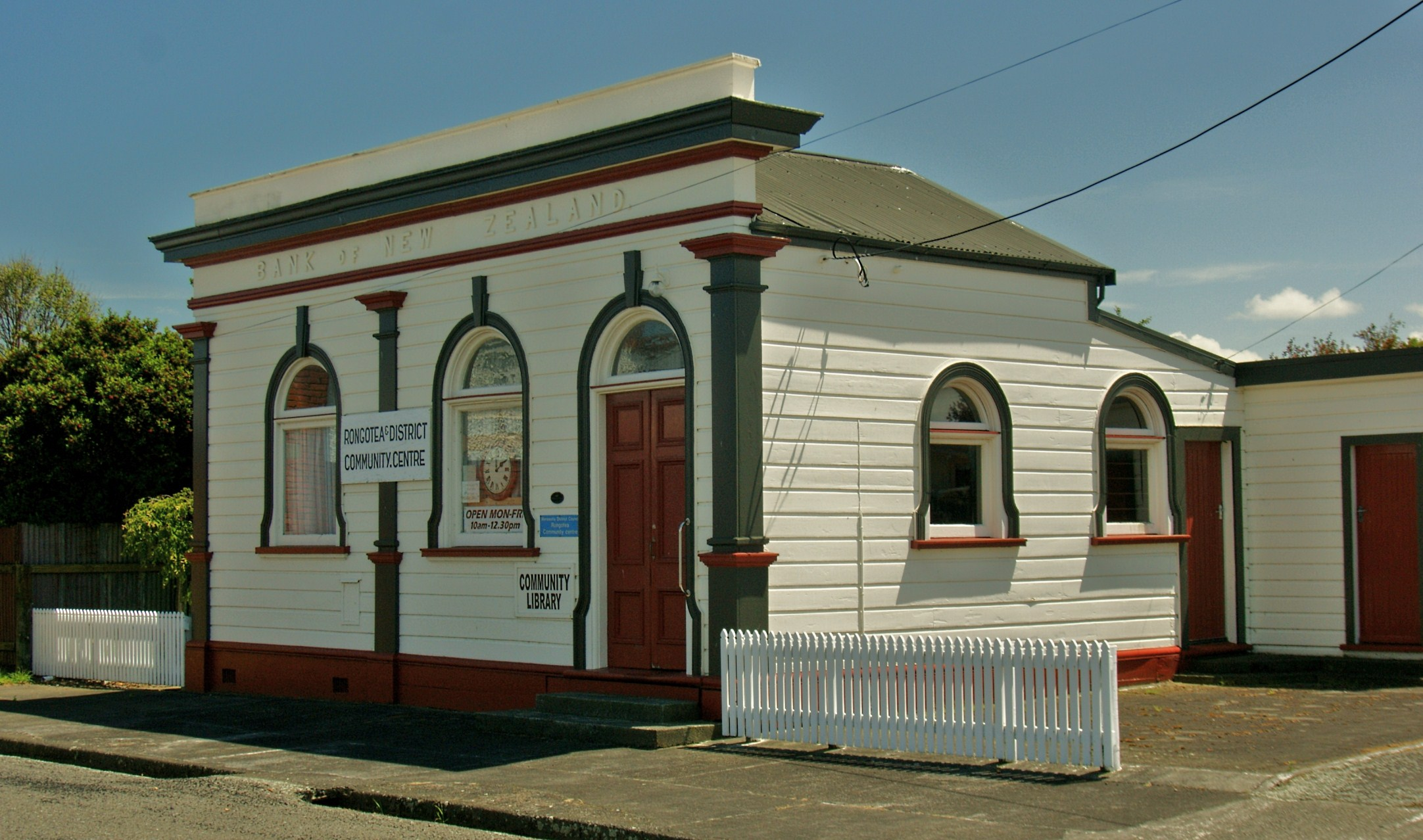
- Rongotea Community Centre and Library (2011)

- Coat of arms

- Manawatu District within the North Island
- Coordinates: 40°05′35″S 175°46′55″E
- Country: New Zealand
- Region: Manawatū-Whanganui
- Wards: Feilding; Rural; Ngā Tapuae o Matangi (Māori)
- Seat: Feilding

Government
  - Mayor: Michael Ford
  - Territorial authority: Manawatu District Council

Area
  - Land: 2,566.59 km^{2} (990.97 sq mi)
- Time zone: UTC+12 (NZST)
  - Summer (DST): UTC+13 (NZDT)
- Postcode(s): Map of postcodes
- Website: www.mdc.govt.nz

Manawatū District (officially Manawatu District) is a territorial authority district in the Manawatū-Whanganui local government region in the North Island of New Zealand, administered by Manawatu District Council. It includes most of the area between the Manawatū River in the south and the Rangitīkei River in the north, stretching from slightly south of the settlement of Himatangi in the south, to just south of Mangaweka in the north, and from the Rangitīkei River to the top of the Ruahine Range in the east. It does not include the Foxton area and the mouth of the Manawatū River, or Palmerston North City (which includes Ashhurst). Its main town is Feilding. The district has an area of 2,624 km².

== Name and geography ==
Manawatū is said to have been named by Hau, a great Māori explorer. As he pursued his wife, who had left him for another lover, along the south-west coast of the North Island, he came across and named river mouths, including Whanganui, Whangaehu and Rangitīkei according to events that befell him at the time. He then came across the mouth of the large, wide Manawatū River; awed by the sight and in fear he might not be able to cross it, he said, "Ka tū taku manawa" (My heart stands still).

The name Manawatū (often the Manawatu) also refers to the whole area centred on the Manawatū Plains, the floodplain of the Manawatū River, with Palmerston North as its principal city. Like some other areas of New Zealand such as Wairarapa and the King Country, the Manawatū in this sense has never had precisely defined boundaries, its extents determined largely by custom and preference. Always included are Palmerston North and all of today's Manawatu District, and usually included is that part of Horowhenua District lying north of Levin. Parts of Rangitikei and/or Tararua districts might also be included.

On 19 December 2024 Minister for Land Information Chris Penk declined a proposal from the New Zealand Geographic Board to add a macron and change the spelling of Manawatu District to "Manawatū", despite this being the spelling used for the Manawatū River and the Manawatū-Whanganui Regional Council.

== Demographics ==
Manawatu District covers 2,566.59 km^{2} (990.97 sq mi) and had an estimated population of 34,000 as of June 2025, with a density of 13.2 people per km^{2}. Feilding, the council seat, has a population of 17,650, the only town with more than 1,000. Other towns and settlements include Halcombe, Himatangi Beach, Kimbolton, Pohangina, Rongotea, Sanson, and Tangimoana.

Historical population
Year	Pop.	±% p.a.
2006	26,070	—
2013	27,459	+0.74%
2018	30,165	+1.90%
2023	32,415	+1.45%

Manawatu District had a population of 32,415 in the 2023 New Zealand census, an increase of 2,250 people (7.5%) since the 2018 census, and an increase of 4,956 people (18.0%) since the 2013 census. There were 16,020 males, 16,275 females and 117 people of other genders in 12,183 dwellings. 2.4% of people identified as LGBTIQ+. The median age was 41.0 years (compared with 38.1 years nationally). There were 6,480 people (20.0%) aged under 15 years, 5,217 (16.1%) aged 15 to 29, 14,406 (44.4%) aged 30 to 64, and 6,312 (19.5%) aged 65 or older.

People could identify as more than one ethnicity. The results were 88.0% European (Pākehā); 18.3% Māori; 2.8% Pasifika; 3.4% Asian; 0.4% Middle Eastern, Latin American and African New Zealanders (MELAA); and 3.1% other, which includes people giving their ethnicity as "New Zealander". English was spoken by 97.5%, Māori language by 4.0%, Samoan by 0.4% and other languages by 4.8%. No language could be spoken by 1.9% (e.g. too young to talk). New Zealand Sign Language was known by 0.9%. The percentage of people born overseas was 11.6, compared with 28.8% nationally.

Religious affiliations were 30.2% Christian, 0.5% Hindu, 0.3% Islam, 1.0% Māori religious beliefs, 0.3% Buddhist, 0.5% New Age, and 1.1% other religions. People who answered that they had no religion were 58.1%, and 8.1% of people did not answer the census question.

Of those at least 15 years old, 3,390 (13.1%) people had a bachelor's or higher degree, 15,042 (58.0%) had a post-high school certificate or diploma, and 6,432 (24.8%) people exclusively held high school qualifications. The median income was $41,700, compared with $41,500 nationally. 2,517 people (9.7%) earned over $100,000 compared to 12.1% nationally. The employment status of those at least 15 was that 13,530 (52.2%) people were employed full-time, 3,657 (14.1%) were part-time, and 489 (1.9%) were unemployed.

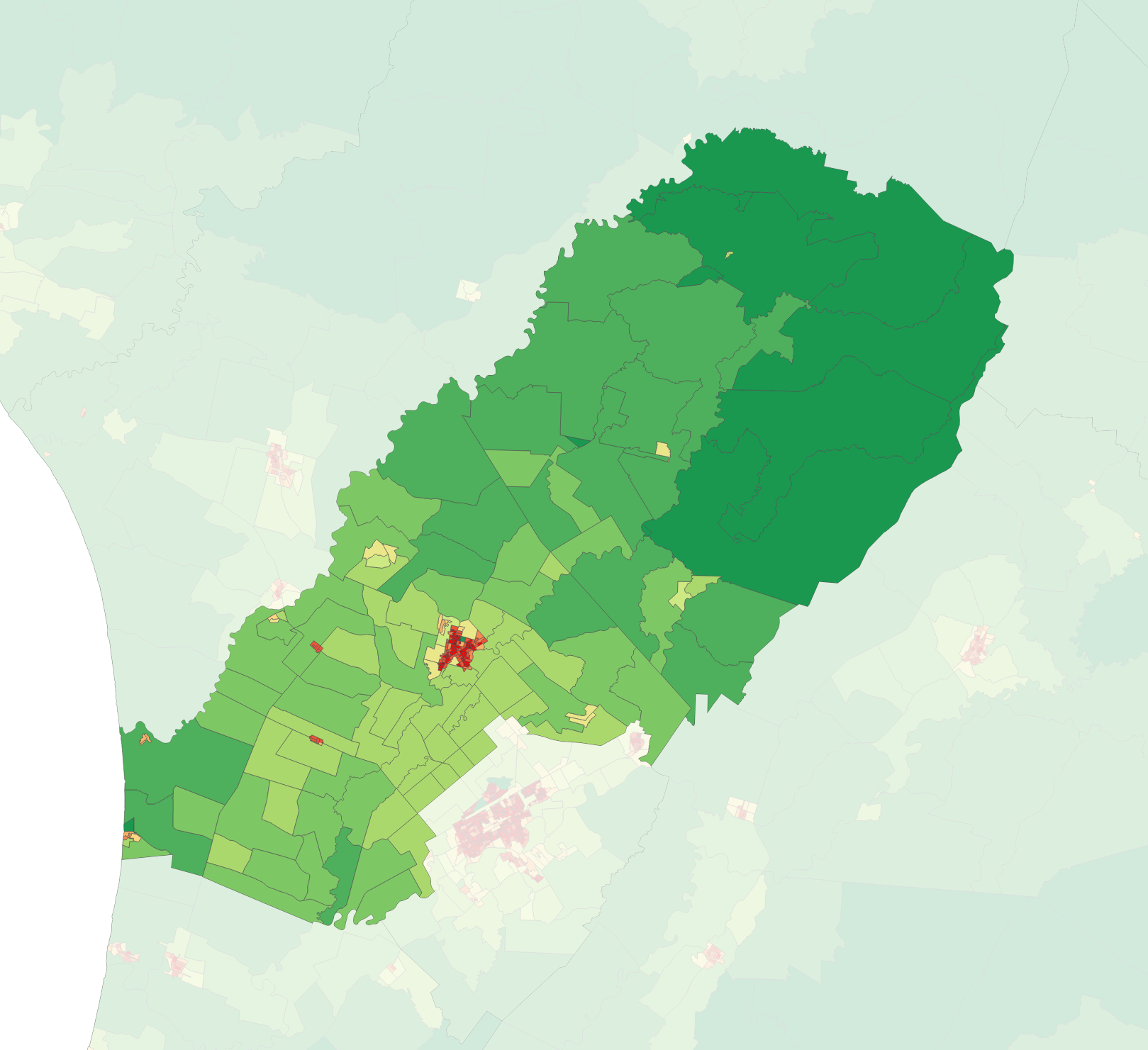
Population density in the 2023 census

Individual wards
Name	Area (km^{2})	Population	Density (per km^{2})	Dwellings	Median age	Median income
Manawatū Rural General Ward	2,538.39	15,489	6.1	5,649	41.4 years	$46,300
Feilding General Ward	28.19	16,929	600.5	6,531	40.5 years	$37,500
New Zealand					38.1 years	$41,500

== Local government ==
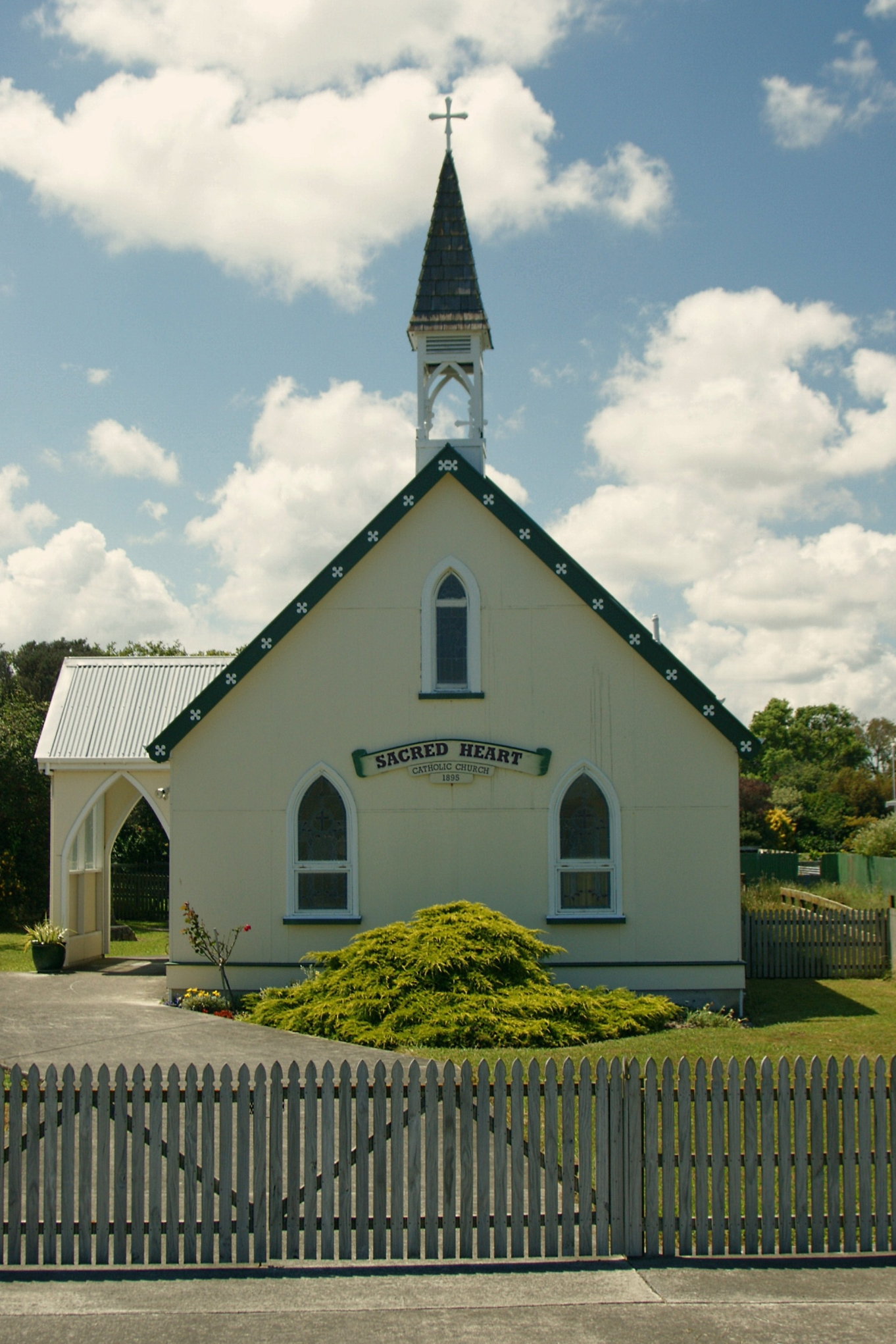
Sacred Heart Catholic Church, Rongotea (built c. 1895)

=== Manawatu County Council ===
Manawatu County Council was one of 63 county councils that were formed in 1876 when the provinces were abolished. It originally extended from Rangiwahia in the north to Waikanae in the south.

The county greatly reduced by various splits over the next 30 years. Three towns split off to form borough councils: Palmerston North (1877, raised to city status in 1930), Feilding (1881), and Foxton (1888). The northern half of (remaining) Manawatu County split off to form Oroua County Council in 1883, initially unilaterally, as a protest against county authority. Parts of Oroua themselves split off to form separate counties (Kiwitea in 1894, Pohangina in 1895, and Kairanga in 1902). In 1903 Oroua County was officially established, covering the remaining parts after these splits, and also losing Ashhurst (transferred to Palmerston North). The area south of the Manawatū River split off to form Horowhenua County Council in 1884.

=== Manawatu District Council ===
Manawatu District Council building

Manawatu District Council was formed in 1988 when Manawatu County Council amalgamated with Kairanga County Council, itself a splinter of Oroua County Council. The following year, Manawatu District amalgamated with Feilding Borough, Kiwitea County, Oroua County and Pohangina County in the 1989 local government reforms.

For the purposes of representation, Manawatu District is divided into two wards:

Ward name	Number of councillors	Area included
Feilding	5	Feilding (urban)
Rural	5	

In 2021, the council decided to establish a Māori ward from the 2022 local election.

The council is responsible for day-to-day administration and services:

- Animal control
- Bylaws
- Cemeteries
- Community grants and funding
- Infrastructure such as roads, drains, rubbish collection
- Library services
- Liquor licensing
- Property profiling

Ian McKelvie was elected mayor in a by-election in November 2002 and remained in the position until he resigned on 15 December 2011, after being elected to Parliament in the 2011 election. Deputy Mayor Matt Bell was then acting mayor until a by-election held on 7 March 2012. The by-election was narrowly won by Margaret Kouvelis from Feilding, who beat councillor Steven Gibson by just 14 votes (3293 votes to 3279). Helen Worboys won the mayoralty from the incumbent Margaret Kouvelis in the 2016 Local Government elections. She retired in October 2025 and was succeeded by Michael Ford.

=== Horizons Regional Council ===
Manawatu District is in the Manawatū-Whanganui Region, which is governed by the Horizons Regional Council. For electoral and representation purposes, the district is divided into:

- Horowhenua-Kairanga Ward: rural area south of Feilding, including the entire Horowhenua District.
- Manawatū-Rangitikei Ward: Feilding and rural area to the north, and including the entire Rangitikei District.

== Tourism ==
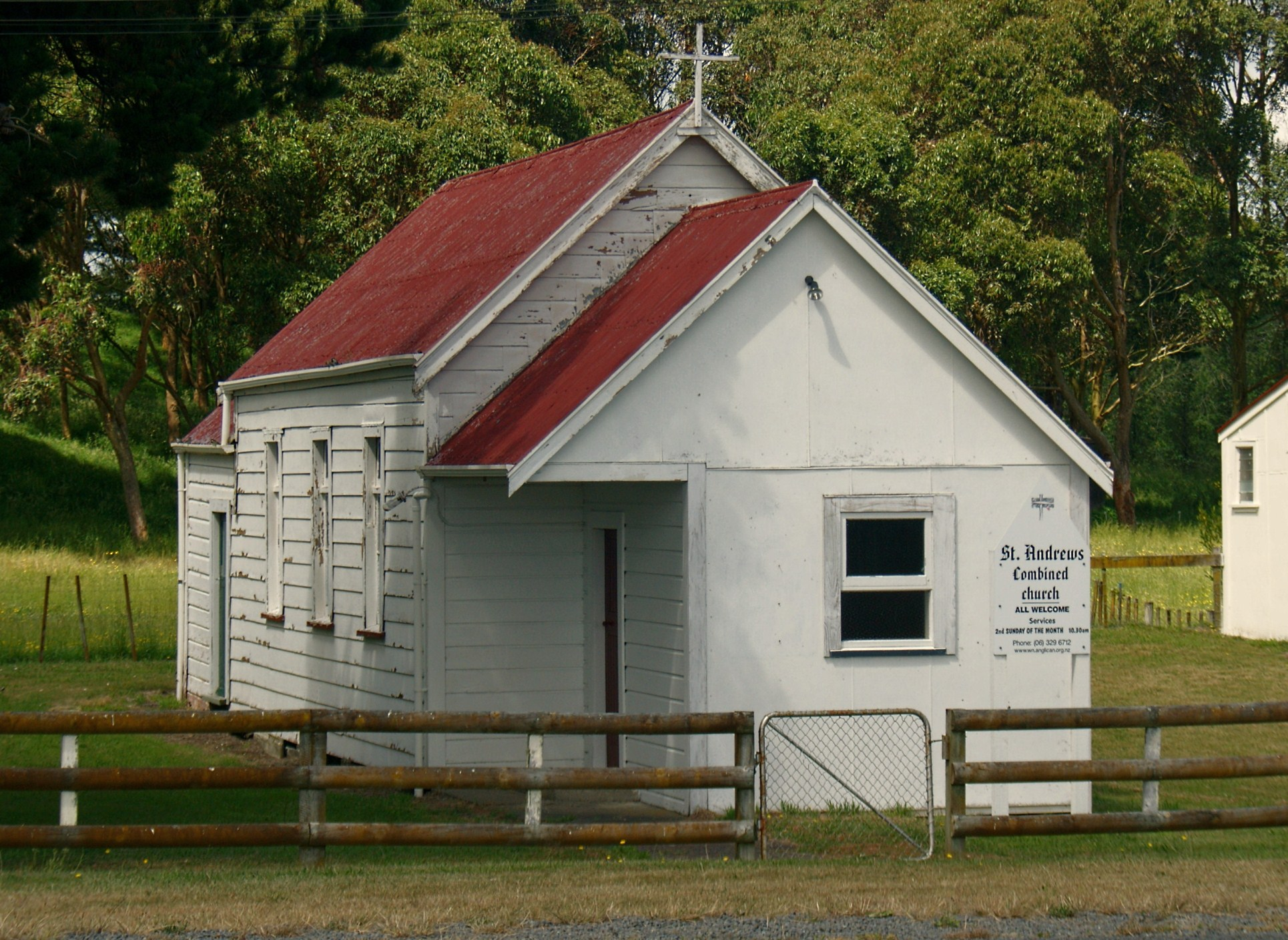
St. Andrews Combined Church and hall, Bainesse, Manawatū

The Manawatu district includes both plains and hills, and is visited by cyclists and others for the views of the Central North Island volcanoes on clear days. The western coast has swimming beaches and large dunes, while the Ruahine Ranges in the east has walking tracks and views over the district from the Wharite mountain or from the Saddle Road.

In the middle of the district is Feilding, with its saleyards, equestrian and motorsport venue (Manfeild), boutique shopping and historical landmarks and collections.

The Royal New Zealand Air Force's main base, RNZAF Base Ohakea, is in Manawatū.

== Schools ==
Secondary:

- Feilding High School, Feilding
- Hato Paora College, Cheltenham
