= Feilding =

Settlement in Manawatū-Whanganui Region, New Zealand

- Town
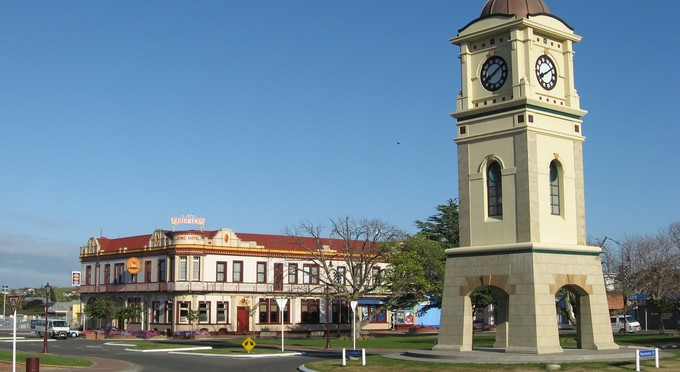
- Manchester Square
- Nickname: 'Friendly' Feilding
- Interactive map of Feilding
- Coordinates: 40°13′S 175°34′E
- Country: New Zealand
- Region: Manawatū-Whanganui
- District: Manawatū District
- Ward: Feilding General Ward; Ngā Tapuae o Matangi Māori Ward
- Established: 1871
- Named for: Colonel William Henry Adelbert Feilding
- Electorates: Rangitīkei; Te Tai Hauāuru (Māori)

Government
  - Territorial Authority: Manawatū District Council
  - Regional council: Horizons Regional Council
  - Mayor of Manawatu: Michael Ford
  - Rangitīkei MP: Suze Redmayne
  - Te Tai Hauāuru MP: Debbie Ngarewa-Packer

Area
  - Total: 23.59 km^{2} (9.11 sq mi)
- Elevation: 70 m (230 ft)

Population (June 2025)
  - Total: 17,650
  - Density: 748.2/km^{2} (1,938/sq mi)
- Time zone: UTC+12 (NZST)
  - Summer (DST): UTC+13 (NZDT)
- Postcode: 4702
- Telephone: 06
- Website: www.feilding.co.nz

Feilding is a town in the Manawatū District of the North Island of New Zealand. It is located on State Highway 54, 20 kilometres north of Palmerston North. The town is the seat of the Manawatū District Council.

Feilding has won the annual New Zealand's Most Beautiful Town award 16 times. It is an Edwardian-themed town, with the district plan encouraging buildings in the CBD to be built in that style.

Feilding is a service town for the surrounding farming district. The Feilding Saleyards has been a vital part of the wider Manawatū community for over 125 years. As transport systems improved and farming practices changed, the need for small, local saleyards all but disappeared, leaving few major selling complexes in New Zealand. Manawatū is a diverse and fertile farming area with high production, high stock-carrying capacity, and a stable climate. These factors make Feilding Saleyards a popular medium for many farmers. A unique aspect of Feilding Saleyards is their location in the centre of town.

The Manawatū Plains, on which the town is sited, are very fertile land, and as such it is a prosperous agricultural area. Being located on the floodplain of a major river has its problems, however, and in February 2004 the town suffered extensive flooding. In 2009 the Horizons Regional Council commissioned a new flood protection scheme to prevent extensive flooding in the future.

== History ==
=== European settlement ===
The town was named after Colonel William H. A. Feilding, a director of the Emigrants and Colonists Aid Corporation Ltd. who negotiated the purchase of a 100,000 acre (400 km²) block of land from the Wellington provincial government in 1871. The first European settlers arrived from Great Britain on 22 January 1874.

The Feilding Edwardian Project Inc. was established in September 1993 by local businesses with the aim of revitalising the central business area of Feilding. Many of the commercial buildings were built in the 1900s (Edwardian era) and have been restored and preserved over time. Feilding is home to a number of historic collections, buildings, monuments, and museums, including Archives Central, The Coach House Museum, St Johns Church, Feilding Club, Feilding Hotel, and Feilding & Districts Steam Rail Society.

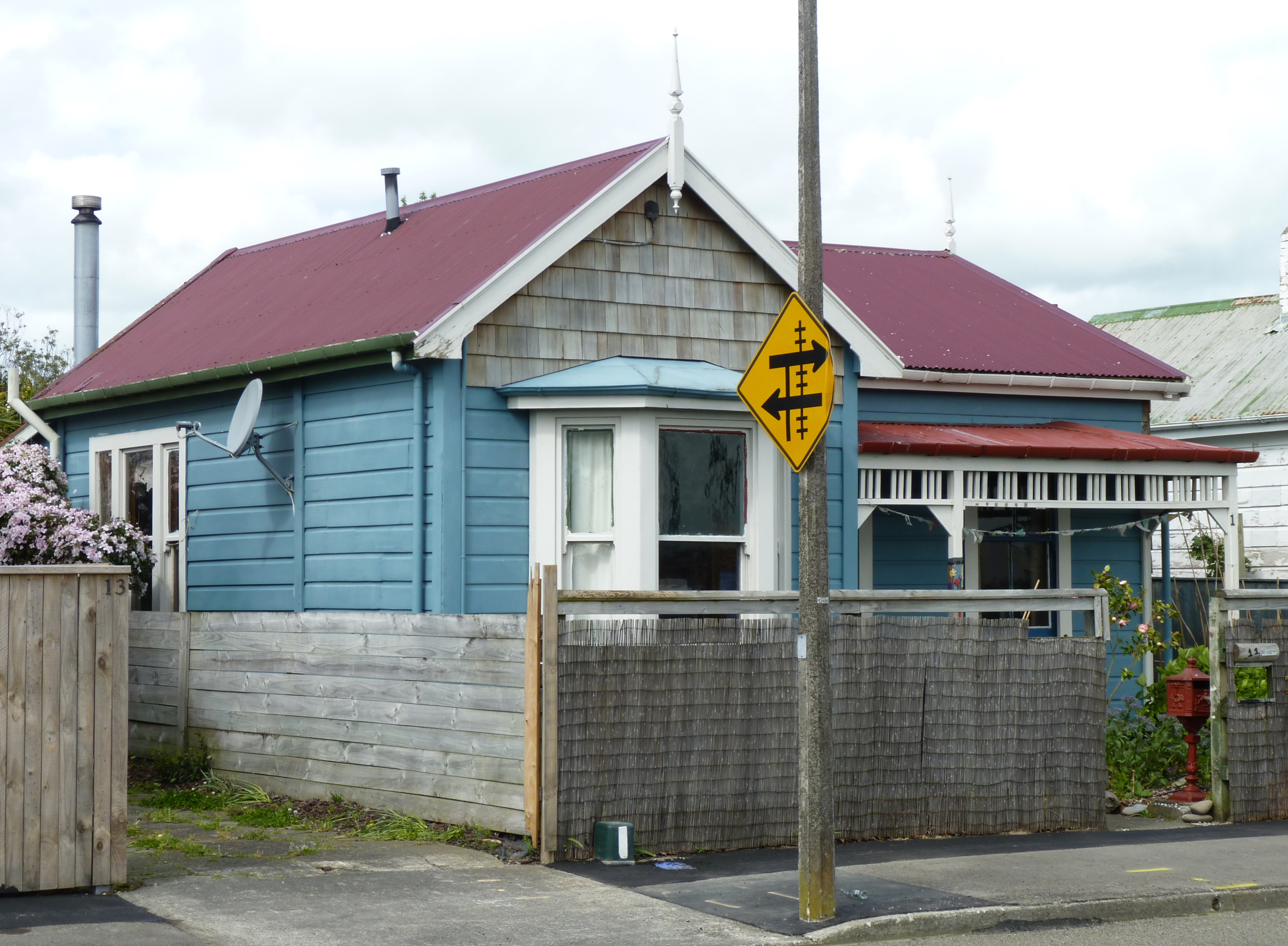
House at 11 Beattie Street; NZ Heritage list 2831

=== Marae ===
Feilding has two marae, connected to the iwi of Ngāti Kauwhata: Aorangi Marae and its Maniaihu meeting house; and Kauwhata Marae or Kai Iwi Pā and its Kauwhata meeting house.

In October 2020, the Government committed $1,248,067 from the Provincial Growth Fund to upgrade Kauwhata Marae and 5 others, creating 69 jobs.

== Demographics ==
Feilding is described by Stats NZ as a medium urban area and covers 23.59 km^{2} (9.11 sq mi).

Feilding had an estimated population of 17,650 as of June 2025, with a population density of 748.2 people per km^{2}.

Historical population
Year	Pop.	±% p.a.
2006	13,572	—
2013	14,469	+0.92%
2018	15,990	+2.02%
2023	16,929	+1.15%
The 2006 population is for a larger area of 23.65 km^{2}. Source:

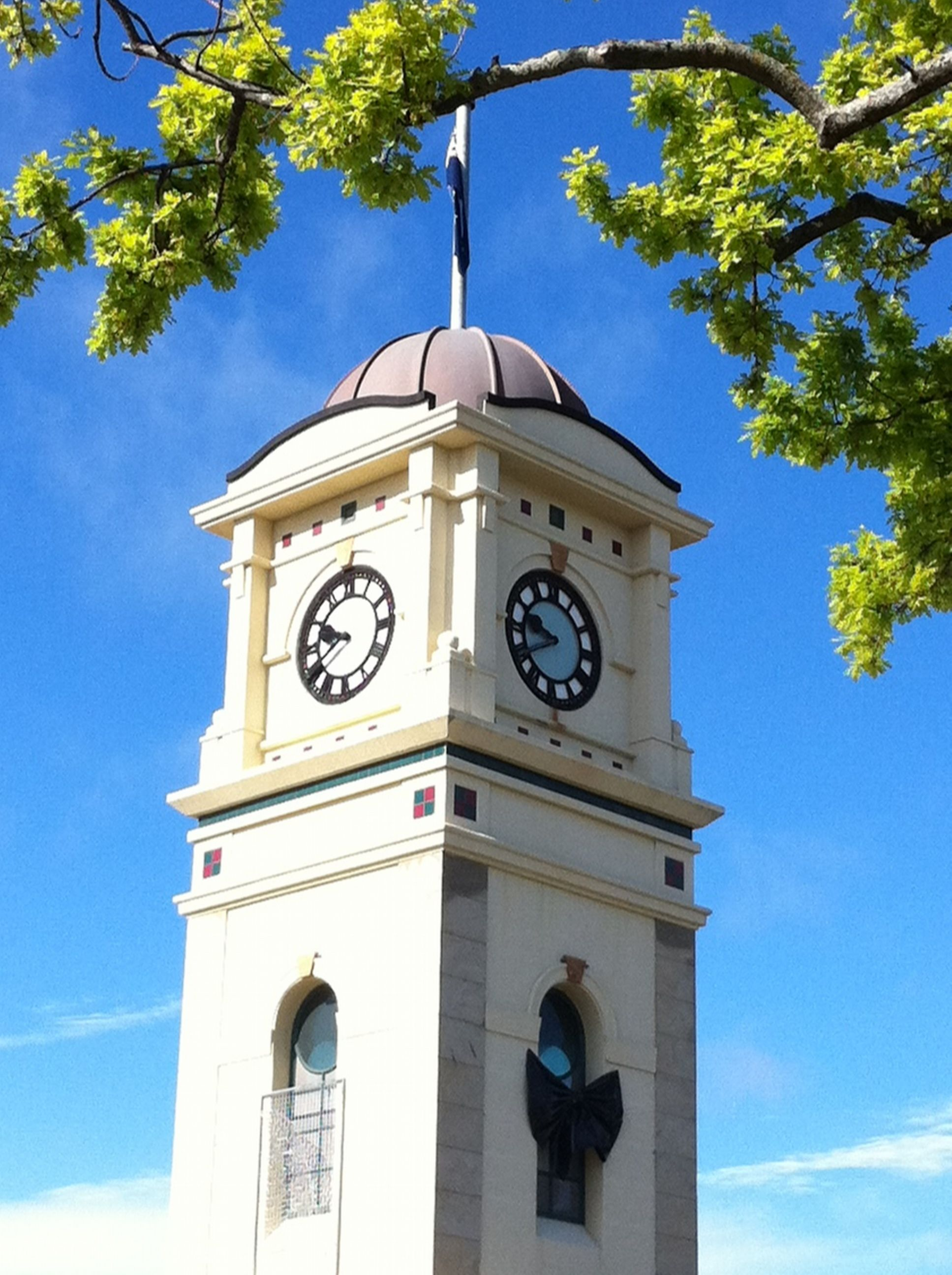
Feilding Clocktower

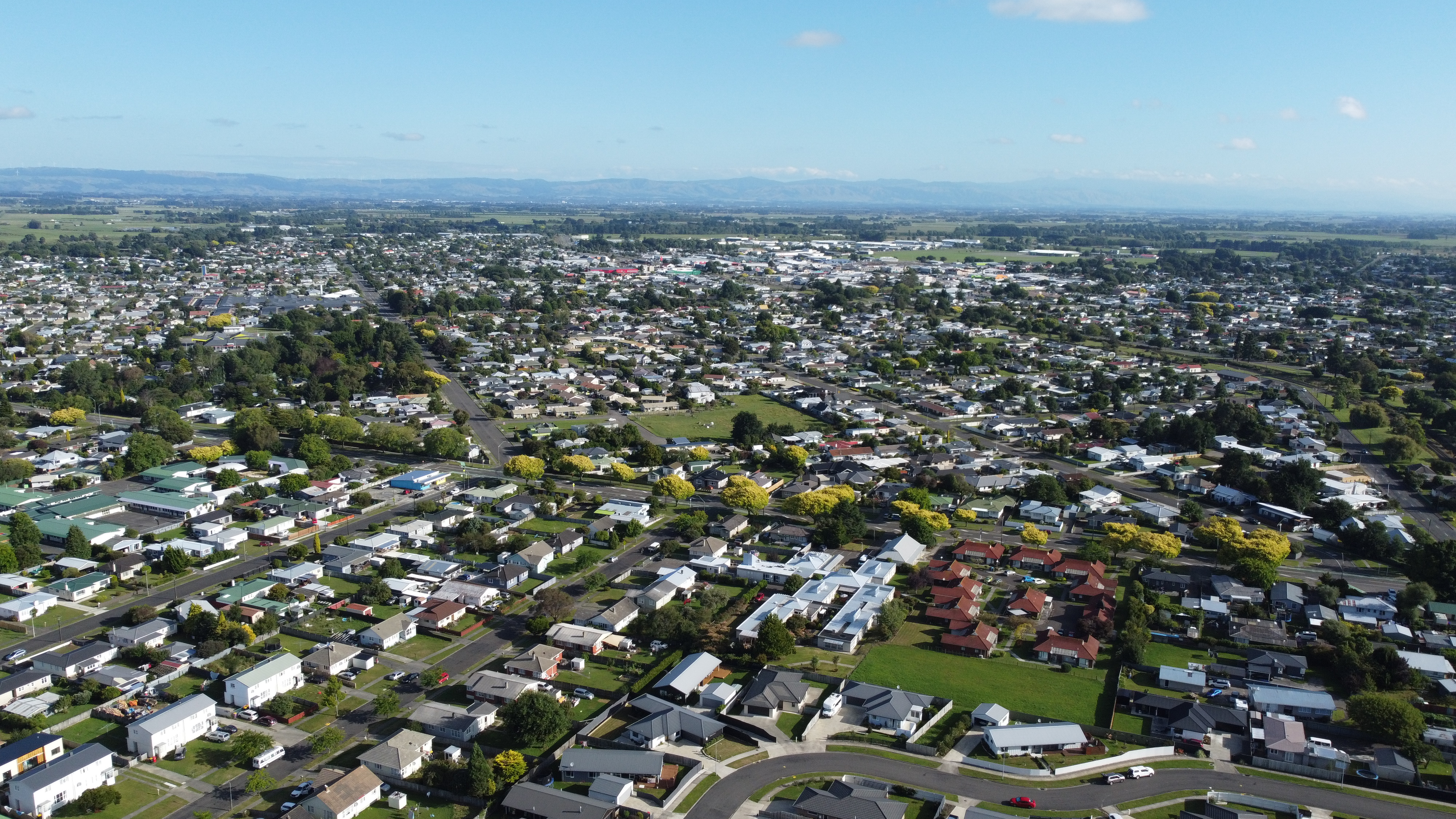
View of Feilding facing south

Feilding had a population of 16,929 in the 2023 New Zealand census, an increase of 939 people (5.9%) since the 2018 census, and an increase of 2,460 people (17.0%) since the 2013 census. There were 8,184 males, 8,679 females, and 66 people of other genders in 6,534 dwellings. 2.6% of people identified as LGBTIQ+. The median age was 40.5 years (compared with 38.1 years nationally). There were 3,339 people (19.7%) aged under 15 years, 2,820 (16.7%) aged 15 to 29, 6,960 (41.1%) aged 30 to 64, and 3,813 (22.5%) aged 65 or older.

People could identify as more than one ethnicity. The results were 85.5% European (Pākehā); 20.6% Māori; 3.6% Pasifika; 4.1% Asian; 0.6% Middle Eastern, Latin American and African New Zealanders (MELAA); and 2.4% other, which includes people giving their ethnicity as "New Zealander". English was spoken by 97.1%, Māori by 4.7%, Samoan by 0.4%, and other languages by 5.3%. No language could be spoken by 2.0% (e.g. too young to talk). New Zealand Sign Language was known by 1.1%. The percentage of people born overseas was 12.4, compared with 28.8% nationally.

Religious affiliations were 31.7% Christian, 0.7% Hindu, 0.4% Islam, 1.2% Māori religious beliefs, 0.4% Buddhist, 0.5% New Age, 0.1% Jewish, and 1.2% other religions. People who answered that they had no religion were 56.3%, and 7.7% of people did not answer the census question.

Of those at least 15 years old, 2,049 (15.1%) people had a bachelor's or higher degree, 7,797 (57.4%) had a post-high school certificate or diploma, and 3,744 (27.5%) people exclusively held high school qualifications. The median income was $37,400, compared with $41,500 nationally. 1,038 people (7.6%) earned over $100,000 compared to 12.1% nationally. The employment status of those at least 15 was 6,510 (47.9%) full-time, 1,665 (12.3%) part-time, and 279 (2.1%) unemployed.

Individual statistical areas
Name	Area (km^{2})	Population	Density (per km^{2})	Dwellings	Median age	Median income
Feilding Central	6.66	996	150	423	42.7 years	$34,300
Kimbolton North	4.21	3,621	860	1,377	42.4 years	$37,000
Kimbolton South	1.35	2,208	1,636	801	38.4 years	$36,700
Kimbolton West	1.16	2,583	2,227	1,011	40.8 years	$33,200
Makino	1.71	3,078	1,800	1,101	34.8 years	$39,400
Mount Taylor	3.19	609	191	204	37.9 years	$56,300
Sandon	4.49	2,277	507	909	46.2 years	$43,200
Warwick	0.82	1,557	1,899	705	46.5 years	$33,500
New Zealand					38.1 years	$41,500

== Economy ==
Employing about 30 people with a payroll of $1.5m in 2015, Proliant, an Iowa based firm privately held by the father and son team of Wally and Nix Lauridsen, constructed a $24m factory on the outskirts of Feilding for the production of a byproduct from cattle blood plasma, bovine serum albumin (BSA), which is used in pharmaceuticals, vaccines and medical research. Proliant produces about half of the world's BSA.

In the Manawatū District of the people aged 15 years or over:

- 40% earn $20,000 or less (NZ 38.8%)
- 14% earn more than $50,000 (NZ 16.2%)
- the unemployment rate is 3.8% (NZ 7.3%)
- 73.4% of permanent private dwellings are owned with or without a mortgage by the occupant(s) (NZ 66.9%)
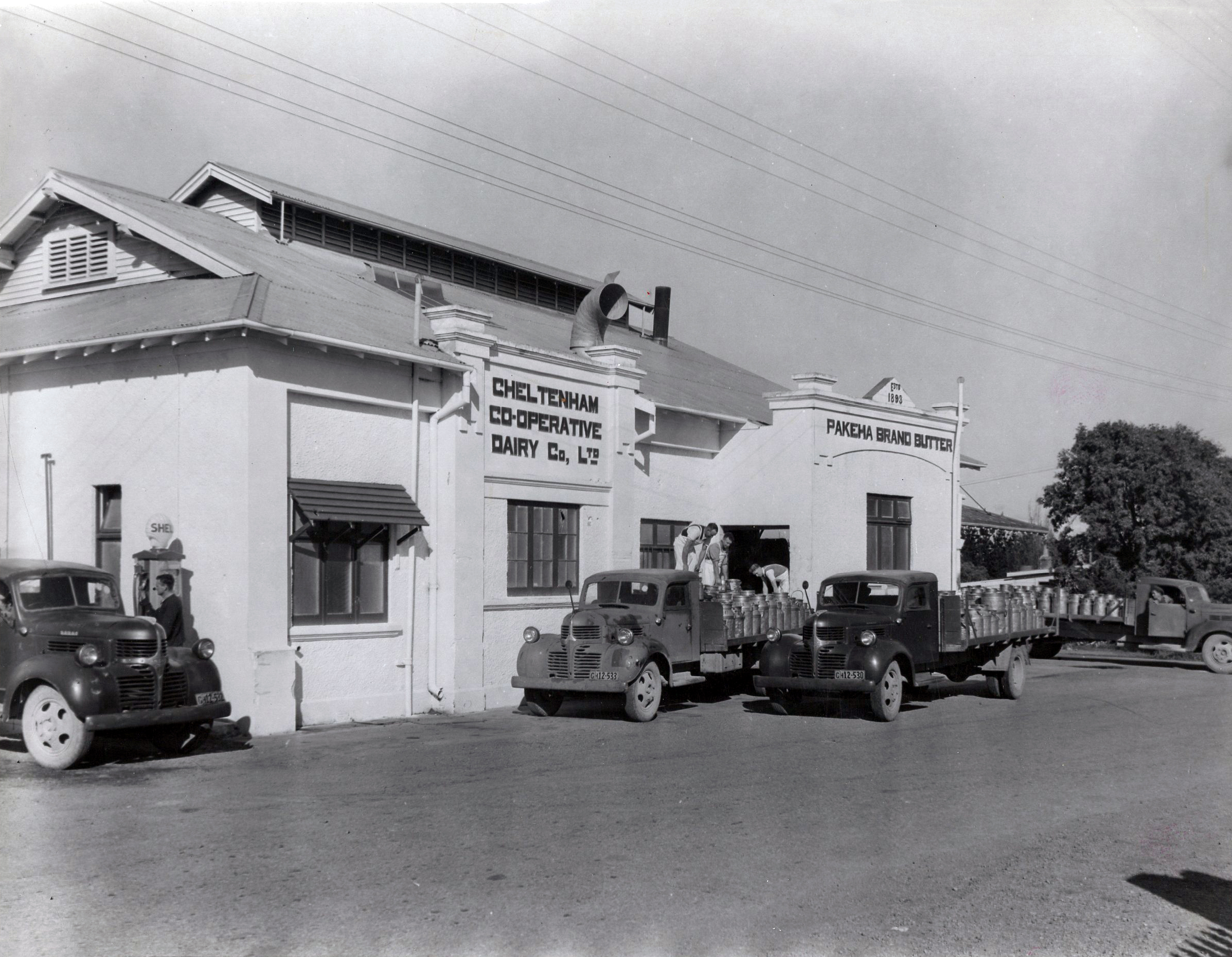
  Cheltenham Co-Operative Dairy Factory, Makino, Feilding

== Features ==
- One of New Zealand's main motor racing circuits, Manfeild, is located at the southern edge of the town.
- There is an active light aircraft airfield Feilding Aerodrome and is located at the eastern edge of the town.
- The depot of the Feilding and District Steam Rail Society is located in the town and it runs railway excursions from this base.
- Feilding's stock saleyards were once one of the largest in the southern hemisphere and are right in the central business area.
- Feilding railway station
- The Coach House Museum
- Focal Point Cinema Feilding
- Te Ahuru Mowai (community hub/library)
- There are no traffic lights and no parking meters

== Education ==
All the schools are co-educational. Rolls are as of July 2026.

=== Secondary schools ===
- Feilding High School, commonly known as "FAHS" from the time when it was "Feilding Agricultural High School", is a state secondary (years 9–13) school with a roll of 1,682. It was established in 1921 as Feilding Technical High School, replacing Feilding District High School (fl. 1903). It later became Feilding Agricultural High School. It was renamed FAHS - Feilding High School in 2001.

=== Primary and intermediate schools ===
Lytton Street School

- Feilding Intermediate School is a state intermediate (years 7–8) school with a roll of 327. It was established in 1964.
- Lytton Street School is a state contributing primary (years 1–6) school with a roll of 570. It was established in 1901. In 1937 Makino Road school closed and its 50 pupils were bussed to Lytton Street. Makino had been established in 1886 and its building was moved to Bluff Road, Rangiwahia.
- Manchester Street School is a state contributing primary (years 1–6) school with a roll of 381. It was established in 1874.
- North Street School is a state full primary (years 1–8) school with a roll of 345. It opened in 1958.
- St Joseph's School is a Catholic integrated full primary (years 1–8) school with a roll of 73. It opened in 1906.
- Taonui School, located south-east of the Feilding township, is a state full primary (years 1–8) school with a roll of 147. It opened in 1879.

== Transport ==
Feilding is located on State Highway 54, which connects State Highway 1 at Vinegar Hill with State Highway 3 at Newbury, forming the primary route between Feilding and central Palmerston North. Other significant routes include Awahuri Road, which links Feilding with SH 3 at Awahuri and provides the most direct route to Sanson, Bulls, and Whanganui; Halcombe Road, which connects Feilding to SH 1 near Marton via Halcombe; and Waughs Road and Campbells Road, which together link Feilding to Bunnythorpe. From Bunnythorpe, traffic can continue via Ashhurst Road to SH 3 at Ashhurst, or via Railway Road to Palmerston North Airport and eastern Palmerston North.

A regular public bus service, Route 311, operates from Monday to Saturday between Feilding and Palmerston North, travelling via Bunnythorpe and Palmerston North Airport. Additionally, a local loop service, Route 301, operates within Feilding on the same days.

The North Island Main Trunk railway line runs through Feilding; however, the town has not been served by a regular passenger train service since 2012.

== Notable people ==
Notable people from Feilding include:

- Murray Ball, kiwiana cartoonist who drew Footrot Flats
- Jed Brophy, actor, Dwarf Nori in The Hobbit trilogy
- Air Marshal Sir Charles Roderick Carr, KBE, CB, DFC, AFC, was born in Feilding and attended a primary school there
- Eddie Durie was born in Feilding
- Mason Durie, was born in Feilding
- Keith Elliott, recipient of the Victoria Cross medal, attended high school in Feilding
- Mihingarangi Forbes, journalist
- Sarah Hirini, New Zealand women's national rugby union team and sevens team
- Perry Harris, All Black and Manawatu rugby representative
- Hinerangitoariari, artist
- Michael Houstoun, concert pianist
- Glen Jackson, rugby union player and referee born in Feilding
- Sam McNicol, rugby union player, was born in Feilding
- W. H. Oliver, historian and poet, was born in Feilding
- Tom Scott, cartoonist
- Jesse Sergent, olympic cyclist
- Aaron Smith, All Black
- Glenn Standring, film director, was born in Feilding
- Barbara Stewart politician, New Zealand First member of Parliament
- Codie Taylor, All Black attended FAHS
- Simon van Velthooven, Olympic cyclist, America's Cup winner
- Adam Whitelock, New Zealand national rugby sevens team, attended FAHS
- George Whitelock, All Black, attended FAHS
- Luke Whitelock, All Black, attended FAHS
- Sam Whitelock, All Black, attended FAHS
- Peter Williams, attended FAHS

Groups

- Evermore, popular musical group composed of Dann Hume, Jon Hume and Peter Hume

== See also ==
- Feilding Old Boys Oroua Rugby Football Club
