= Kakariki railway station =

Defunct railway station in New Zealand

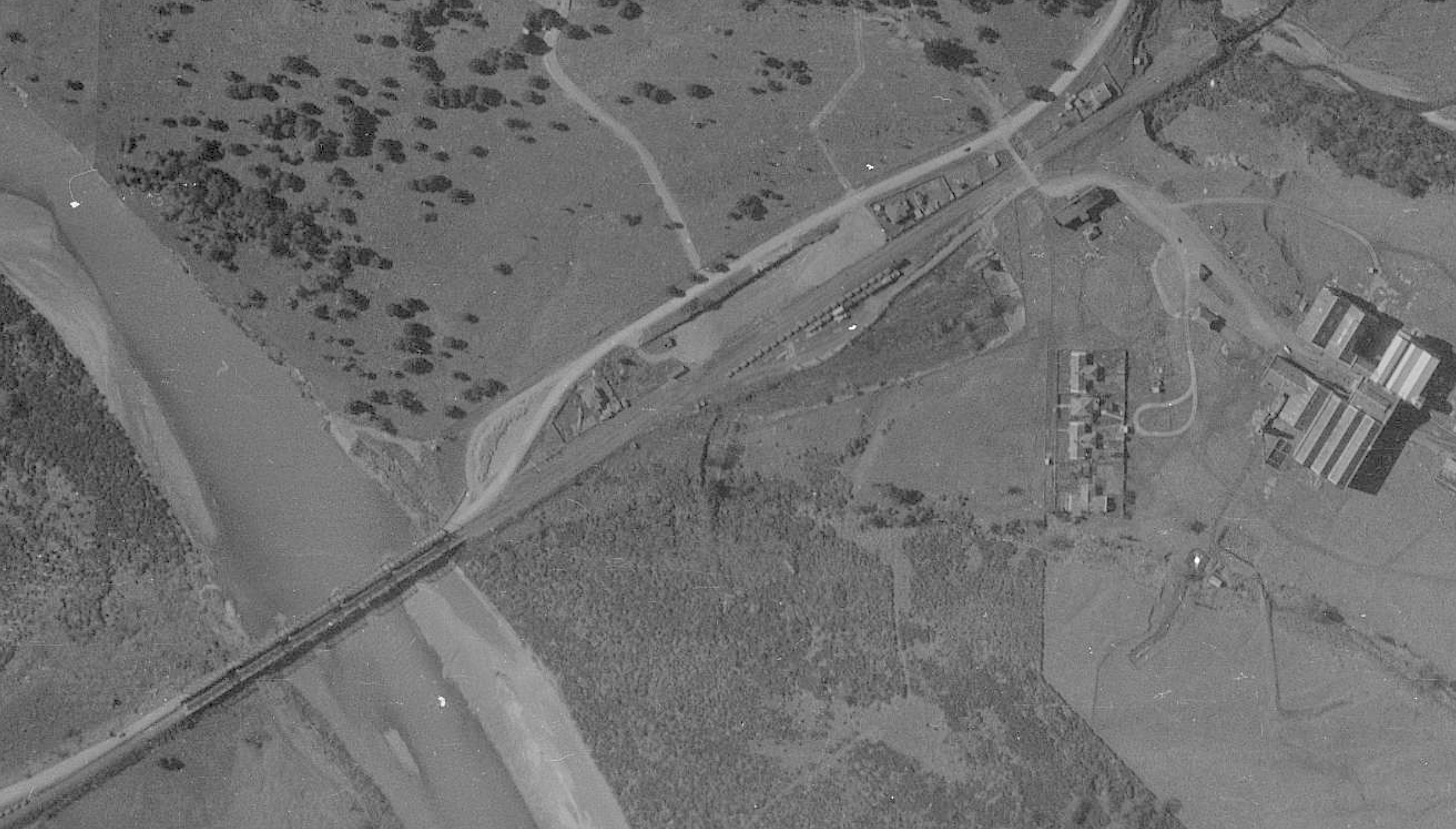
- Kakariki railway station and bridge in 1942

General information
- Location: New Zealand
- Coordinates: 40.125543°S 175.446466°E
- Elevation: 70 m (230 ft)
- Line: North Island Main Trunk
- Distance: Wellington 171.21 km (106.38 mi)

History
- Opened: 1879
- Closed: 31 January 1982
- Electrified: June 1988

Services
Preceding station	Historical railways	Following station
Greatford; Line open, station closed 4.8 km (3.0 mi)	North Island Main Trunk; KiwiRail	Halcombe; Line open, station closed 5.48 km (3.41 mi)
Location

Kakariki railway station was a station on the North Island Main Trunk and in the Manawatū-Whanganui region of New Zealand .

It opened in 1879 and closed in 1982. Only a single track now runs through the station site, as the passing loops here and at Halcombe were replaced by the Rangitawa loop, 2.55 km (1.58 mi) to the south, on 14 December 1983. The new loop is beside Halcombe Road.

A 2008 Ministry of Transport "National Freight Demands Study" said, "Current thinking includes . . . a deviation from Kakariki to Porewa to avoid the steep grades into Marton". A Porewa valley line would be about 7 km (4.3 mi) long and shorten the NIMT by around 10 km (6.2 mi).

== History ==
Locket and & Co built the Rangitīkei River bridge and railway from Turakina to Kakariki in 1877, as part of a railway linking the ports of Foxton and Whanganui. Nathan & Wilkie built the Kakariki to Feilding part of the line.

Kakariki wasn't shown on the timetable when the line opened in 1878. In 1878 it was recommended that Kakariki should have a goods shed and loading stage. It was shown in a fare table in 1883. By 1892 Kakariki had a shelter shed, passenger platform, cart approach to the platform, loading bank, crane and a passing loop for 8 wagons. The crane was removed in 1905. By 12 January 1933 it had a ladies waiting room, which caught fire that morning. The station yard was rebuilt in 1940, after the new bridge opened.

A station building and loop for 18 wagons remained in 1980. Kakariki closed to all but private siding traffic on Sunday 31 January 1982. In 1989 it was reported the wool store siding was derelict, but in 1991 it had two wool sidings.

In 1932 fourteen wagons were derailed at the station, when an axle broke.

=== Ballast pit ===
In 1889 an urgent want of ballast land at Kakariki was described and by 1892 there was a ballast siding 1/4 mi (0.40 km) north of the station. The ballast pits either side of the river, which excavated river shingle, seem to have been mainly named Kakariki, but also Greatford.

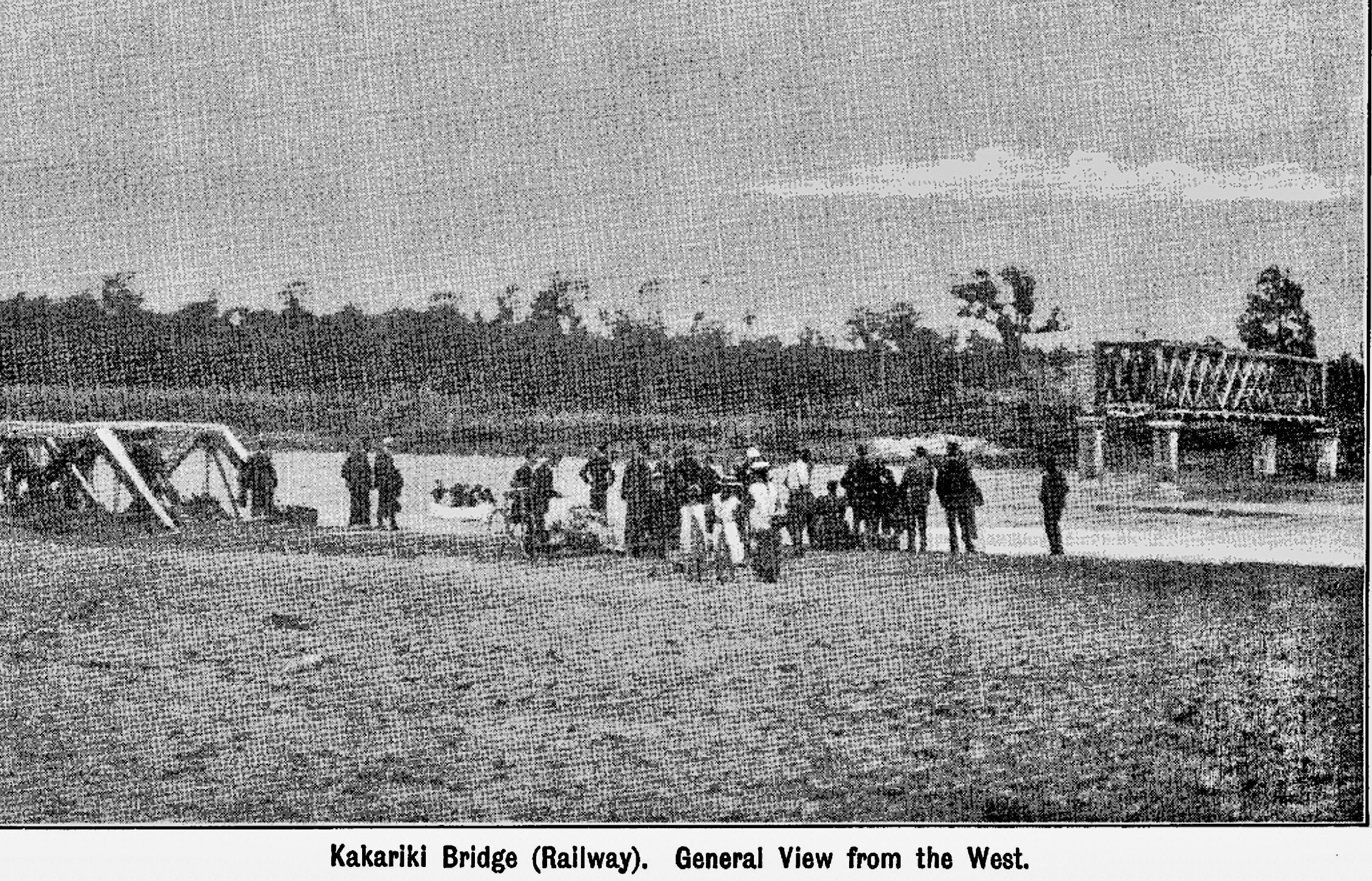
Kakariki railway bridge after 1897 flood

=== Kakariki Bridges ===
The railway crosses the Rangitīkei River on a truss bridge with five 120 ft (37 m) spans and a 40 ft (12 m) abutment, built in 1939. The piers are 46 ft (14 m) to 54 ft (16 m) deep. Just upstream is a 1968, or 1970, bridge carrying Halcombe Road.

The original rail bridge was built in 1877. Three spans of the bridge were washed away in June 1882. The 1882 temporary bridge included 30 tons of cylinders and wooden piles. It was back in use in August 1882. A permanent replacement was being built in October 1882 and completed in June 1883. The railway bridge was swept away again in 1897. It was converted to a road rail bridge from 5 March 1900. A loose beam on the bridge hit a train in 1933.

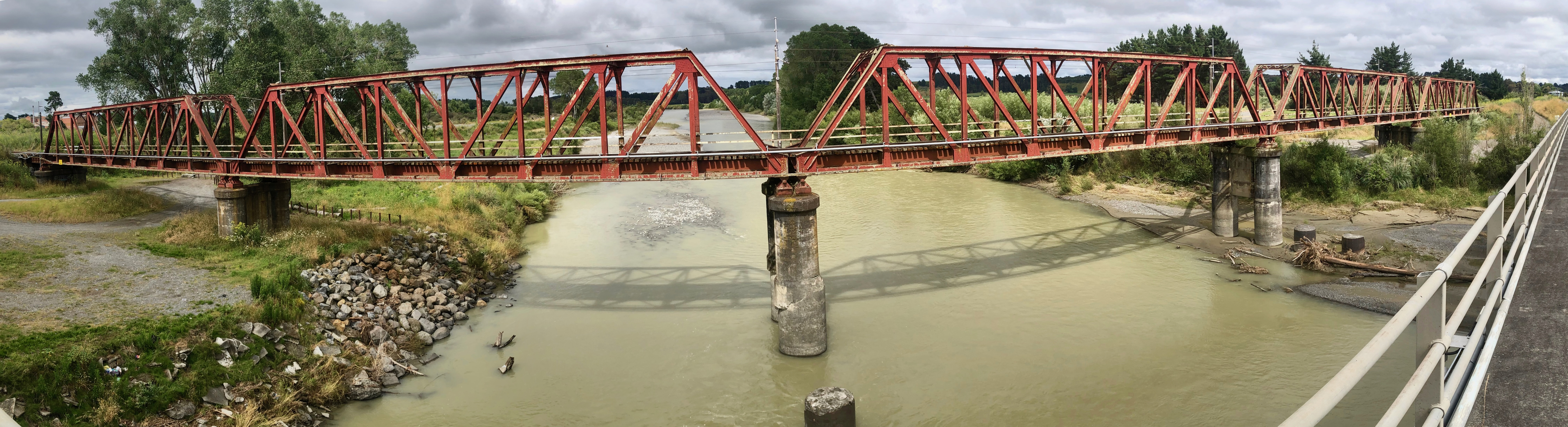
Kakariki railway bridge in 2021

In 1939 the road rail bridge became a road only bridge, when the present railway bridge was built. That former rail bridge was demolished in 1970.

=== Deviation ===
To ease the climb to Halcombe from 1 in 53 to 1 in 70, a deviation was built in 1915, with a new girder bridge over Rangitawa Stream and a 3 span 60 ft (18 m), reinforced concrete bridge carrying Halcombe Road over a new 30 ft (9.1 m) deep cutting.

=== Factory ===
The factory at Kakariki has had a variety of uses. A sawmill closed in 1879, when the bush had been felled. Work started on a flaxmill about 1882. By 1889 flax was being railed from Kakariki to Feilding.

The Wellington Meat Export Co freezing works had a siding from 2 April 1917 and had three sidings when it opened in 1918. The works was said to have brought the company close to bankruptcy and it closed in 1923, though it was mentioned as in use in 1924. The machinery was removed in 1935. In the 1940s it was used for Air Force storage. From 1945, it was used for cool wool storage, having been re-equipped in 1940 for dairy products, with freezers from the Port Bowen, wrecked at Castlecliff in 1939.

In 1948 Feltex converted the factory to a wool scour plant using machinery moved from Melbourne; the then Managing Director owned a nearby farm. In 1980 the Feltex siding could hold 18 wagons. According to its later much litigated prospectus, the Kakariki plant employed 47 in 2004. In 2006 Feltex went into receivership. Godfrey Hirst took over and closed the plant.

In 2007 the site was sold to Kakariki Industrial Park. It is now part leased to Kakariki Proteins as a rendering plant to produce animal feed. In 2019 the site was identified as a potential source of per- and poly-fluoroalkyl contamination of the Bulls water supply. A 1940s report had said, “There is ample water available from wells sunk on the banks of the Rangitiki River and drainage into the Rangitiki River basin is assured for the disposal of industrial effluents.” Most of the 1918 works remains, except that the brick chimney has been replaced by a metal one.

=== St Joseph's church ===
1.7 km (1.1 mi) east of the station is the small Catholic church of St Joseph, built on Te Hiri Marae in 1914 for Ngāti Rangatahi and designed by John Swan. It was registered by Heritage New Zealand as a Category 2 heritage item, with registration number 7188 on 23 June 1994.

Just beyond the church, a school opened between 1898 and 1899. It closed in the 1970s.
