= Greatford railway station =

Defunct railway station in New Zealand

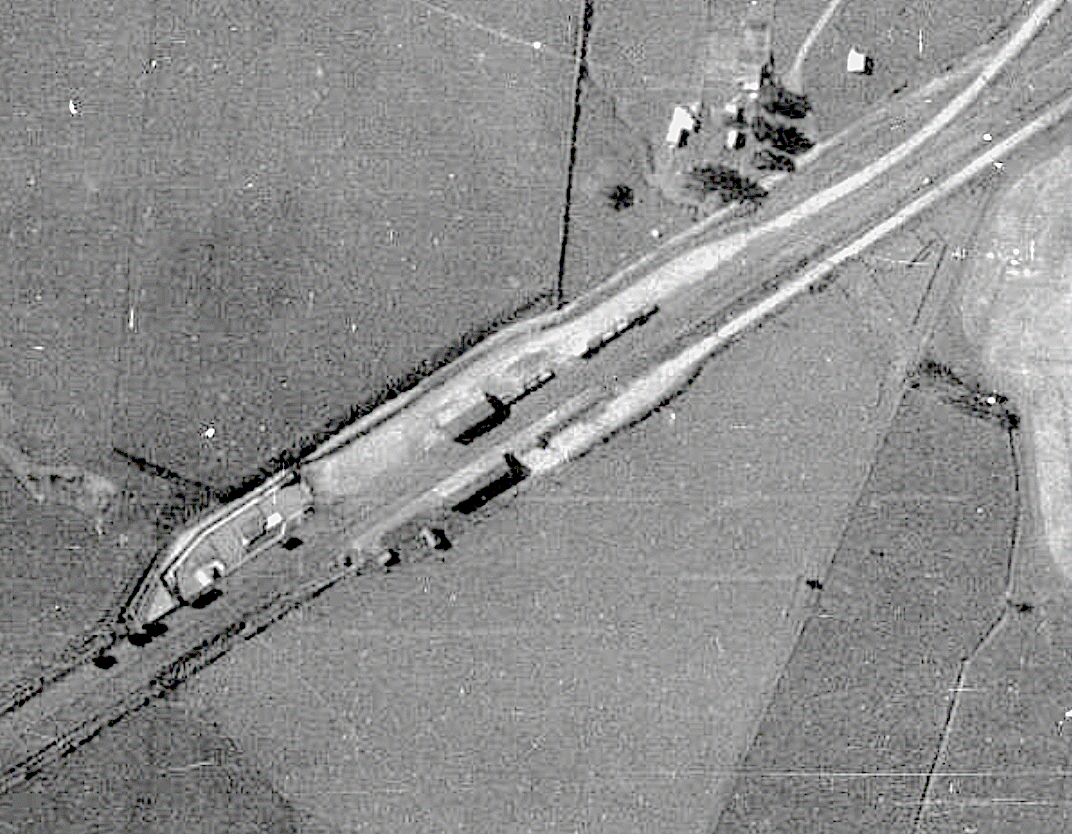
- Greatford railway station in 1942

General information
- Location: New Zealand
- Coordinates: 40.125396°S 175.415496°E
- Elevation: 105 m (344 ft)
- Line: North Island Main Trunk
- Distance: Wellington 176.01 km (109.37 mi)

History
- Opened: 20 May 1878
- Closed: 27 March 1983
- Rebuilt: 11 June 1939; 400 m (1,300 ft) north-westwards
- Electrified: June 1988

Services
Preceding station	Historical railways	Following station
Marton; Line open, station closed 4.24 km (2.63 mi)	North Island Main Trunk; KiwiRail	Kakariki; Line open, station closed 4.8 km (3.0 mi)
Location

Greatford railway station was a station on the North Island Main Trunk (NIMT) in New Zealand, south of Marton. It is in the Manawatū-Whanganui region. Only a substation and a passing loop remain.

== History ==
=== Opening ===
Special trains ran from Halcombe and from Palmerston North to Marton in April 1878. On 20 May 1878 the Halcombe to Greatford section opened, as the final link between the ports of Foxton and Whanganui. In 1878 it was noted that the loading stage was built to allow a Fairlie engine to pass. The line was initially worked by these E and R Class engines, which were considered to be running fast when reaching 40 mph (64 km/h) and averaging 25 mph (40 km/h).

The line became part of the NIMT, when it fully opened in 1909, and Greatford was one of the stopping points for Wellington to New Plymouth expresses in 1910 and in the 1940s.

=== Move ===
On 11 June 1939 the station was moved about 440 yd (400 m) north-westwards, from its original site to the east of Cliff Road. The move, which had been planned in 1915, was associated with work starting in 1935, and for which £4,989 was funded in 1938, to ease the gradient and curve on the bank between Greatford and Kakariki to 1 in 70. The realigned curve opened in March 1939 and eliminated two level crossings.

=== Traffic ===
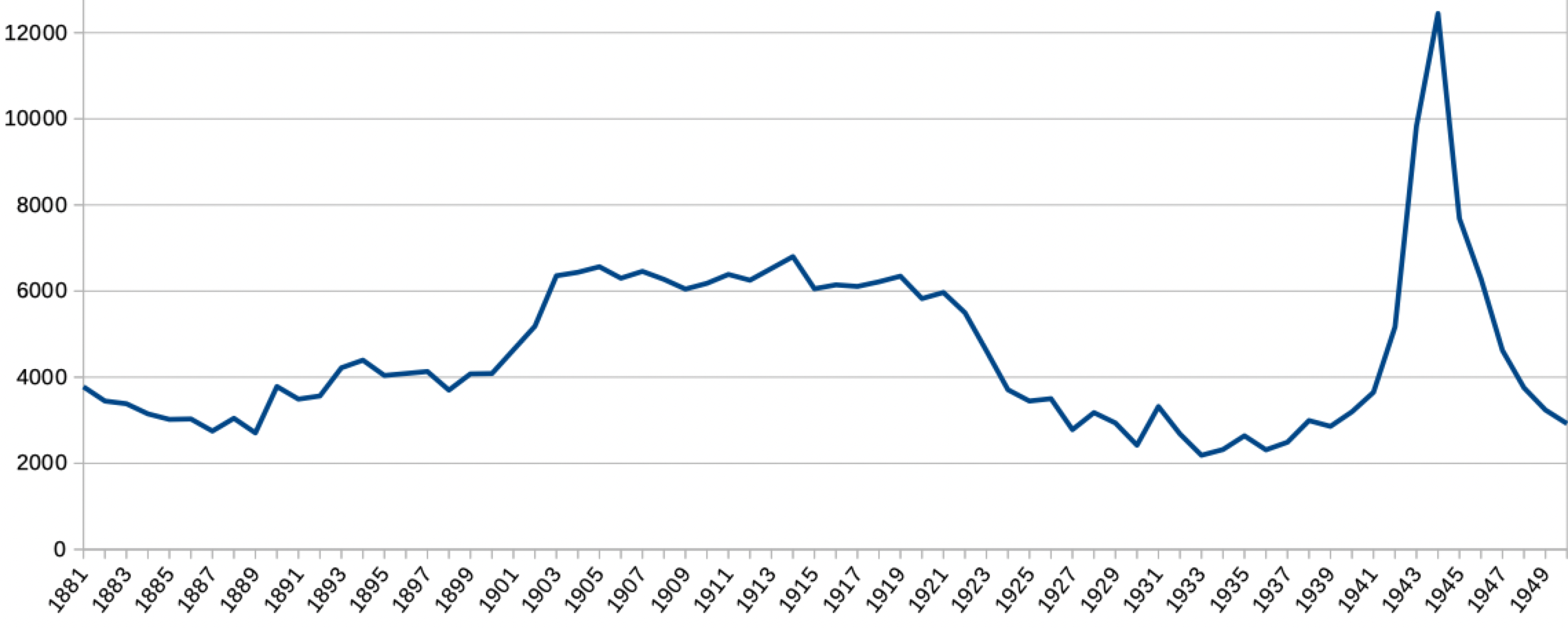
tickets sales 1881–1950 – derived from annual returns to Parliament of "Statement of Revenue for each Station for the Year ended"

Greatford had its annual returns of traffic recorded, as did Marton to the north and Halcombe to the south. In 1912 the station sold 6,258 tickets. By 1923 that had declined to 4,613 passengers, but it still had 22,165 sheep and pigs arriving at the station. In 1950 passenger numbers were down to 2,968. However, in the early days, traffic was such that, in 1897, a Mrs Wolferston asked for authority to supply tea, coffee, and refreshments at the station. In the 1920s the station was staffed at grade 7 by a stationmaster and clerk.

==== Greatford village ====
Although the village only had a small population (81 in 1886, 132 in 1901, 135 in 2018), the station also served large estates, such as those of former prime minister, William Fox, at Westoe (listed as a Category 1 Historic Place on 29 November 1985) and of William Jarvis Willis at Woodendean. St Martin's Anglican Church was the first building designed by Frederick de Jersey Clere, on land that had been part of Woodendean. It has had a Category 2 listing since 2 April 2004.

==== Bulls and proposed Levin to Greatford railway ====
The station was also the railhead for Bulls. Planned rail links to Bulls were never built. A 4 mi (6.4 km) branch line was considered in 1879, but rejected in 1880. In 1914 a 4 mi (6.4 km) branch was authorised. It isn't clear if this was the gravel pit siding, eventually built, or whether, as suggested at the time, it was to be a link to the Sanson tramway. That proposal had been made in 1892, was rejected in 1916, and made again in 1937. It was planned as a railway from Levin, via an upgrade of the tramway, to Bulls and Greatford, via Foxton. It was claimed that bypassing Palmerston North would shorten the NIMT by about 19 mi (31 km), or a 1905 estimate said 15 mi (24 km). There had also been a request in 1878 to lay a tramway across the railway at Greatford and, in 1883, a plan of a tramway from Greatford to the Rangitīkei River.

==== Gravel pit ====
Rangitīkei County Council had a siding leading to a gravel pit in a bend of the river, 2.55 km (1.58 mi) south of Greatford, from about 1915. It was a short siding, also known as Kakariki Ballast Pit and had been used as a source of railway ballast from 1888, despite the objections of its landowners.

=== Station structures ===
When the station opened it had no waiting room. On 20 March 1878 a contract had been signed with J & C Bull for station buildings, which were completed by 5 August 1879. It seems that the 5th class station built at Halcombe was moved to Greatford, when a much larger station replaced it in 1878. In 1887 a telephone replaced a Morse telegraph and, by 1896, there was a 5th class station, passenger platform, cart approach to platform, 40 ft (12 m) by 30 ft (9.1 m) goods shed, cattle yards, water service, stationmaster's house, urinals and a passing loop for 27 wagons. In 1897 a loading bank and crane were added and the approach road widened, and in 1898 sheep yards were built. On 19 February 1917 the goods shed burnt down. From 1878 to 1968 there was a Post Office at the station. In 1963 two 7½-ton electric gantries were built to handle concrete products.

=== Closure ===
In 1966 the sheep yards were reduced and then closed on 6 March 1972, when they were sold and removed. Fire damaged the station building in 1978. In 1980 all that remained was a high-level loading bank and a loop for 48 wagons. On Sunday 27 March 1983 the station closed to all traffic.

=== Incidents ===
An engine and three trucks overturned when they derailed on the points at the station in 1925. A similar derailment occurred a year earlier.
