= Colyton =

Colyton could be:

- Colyton, New South Wales, Australia
- Colyton, Devon, England
- Colyton, New Zealand

== See also ==
- Coylton, a village and civil parish in South Ayrshire, Scotland
