= Mark Ranby =

New Zealand rugby union player

- Born: Richard Mark Ranby; 1 June 1977 (age 49) Putāruru, New Zealand
- Height: 1.78 m (5 ft 10 in)
- Weight: 91 kg (201 lb)
- School: Freyberg High School
- University: Massey University; University of Cambridge
- Notable relative: Margaret Kouvelis (mother)

Rugby union career
- Position: Second five-eighth
Senior career
Years	Team	Apps	(Points)
2006–2008	Coca-Cola West Red Sparks		
Provincial / State sides
Years	Team	Apps	(Points)
1996	Manawatu	14	
1997–1998	Central Vikings		
1999–2005	Waikato	39	
Super Rugby
Years	Team	Apps	(Points)
1997–1998	Hurricanes	9	
1999–2006	Chiefs		
International career
Years	Team	Apps	(Points)
2001	New Zealand	1	(0)

Richard Mark Ranby (born 1 June 1977) is a former New Zealand rugby union player. A midfield back, Ranby represented Manawatu, the Central Vikings and Waikato at a provincial level, and the Hurricanes and the Chiefs in Super Rugby. He played one international for the New Zealand national side, the All Blacks, against Samoa in 2001. He played for the Japanese side Coca-Cola West Red Sparks for two seasons from 2006. He spent a year studying at the University of Cambridge in 2008–09, completing a Diploma in Theology and Religious Studies, and played for Cambridge against Oxford in the 2008 Varsity Match. In 2012 he was appointed professional development manager for the Crusaders and Canterbury Rugby.

Ranby's mother, Margaret Kouvelis, was elected Mayor of Manawatu in 2012.
