= Halcombe railway station =

Defunct railway station in New Zealand

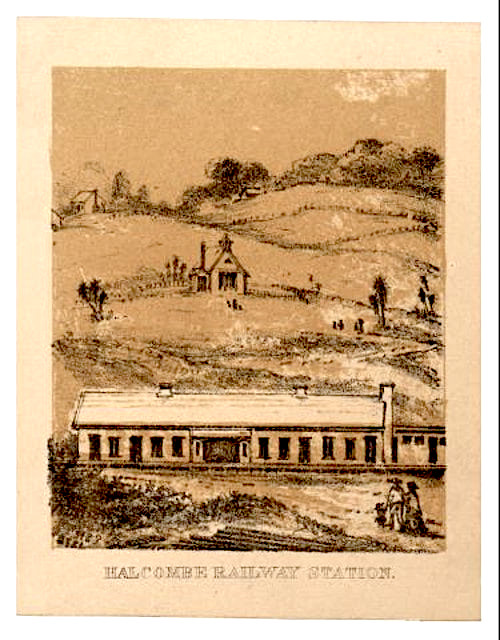
- Halcombe railway station about 1878: drawn by Edith Halcombe

General information
- Location: New Zealand
- Coordinates: 40.146058°S 175.49484°E
- Elevation: 118 m (387 ft)
- Line: North Island Main Trunk
- Distance: Wellington 165.73 km (102.98 mi)

History
- Opened: 22 April 1878
- Closed: 27 March 1983
- Electrified: June 1988

Services
Preceding station	Historical railways	Following station
Kakariki; Line open, station closed 5.48 km (3.41 mi)	North Island Main Trunk; KiwiRail	Maewa; Line open, station closed 7.12 km (4.42 mi)
Location

Halcombe railway station was a station on the North Island Main Trunk (NIMT) in New Zealand, serving the village of Halcombe, in the Manawatū-Whanganui region. It opened in 1878 and closed in 1983. Originally it was the main intermediate station on the 85 mi 34 ch (137.5 km) Whanganui to Foxton railway. Only a single track remains through the station site, as the passing loops here and at Kakariki were replaced by the Rangitawa loop, 3.03 km (1.88 mi) to the north, on 14 December 1983.

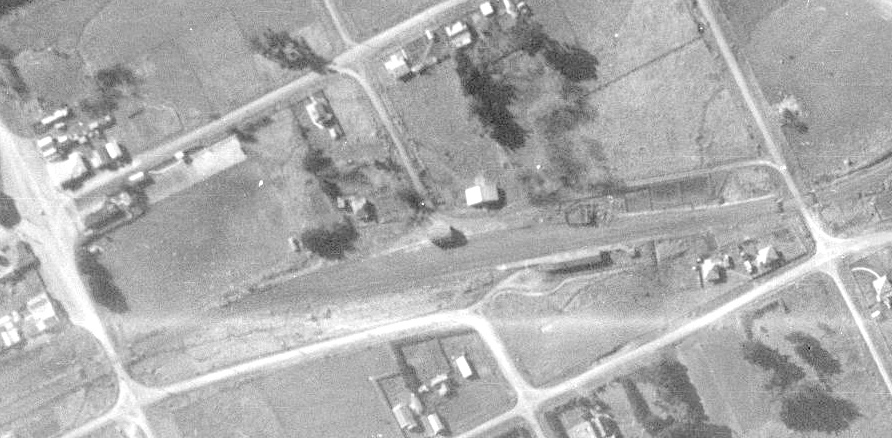
Halcombe in 1942 - Retrolens photo

== History ==
The station had its first trains when the Feilding – Halcombe Section opened on Monday 22 April 1878. When the Halcombe – Marton Section completed the railway, linking the ports of Foxton and Whanganui, on Monday 20 May 1878, the mayor of Palmerston North declared a public holiday.

William Nicholson's contract for a 5th class station started on 17 January 1877 and was completed on 14 April 1877 for £157.5s.

When it was decided that Halcombe should be the refreshment stop on the line, that original station was moved to Greatford and a much larger, 104 ft (32 m) by 20 ft (6.1 m), station was built by J & C Bull. Their £2,845 9s 6d contract got its final certificate on 23 August 1878 and was completed by 5 August 1879. To make way for expansion, the goods shed and loading bank were moved to a new site in 1881. By 1896 there was a special class station building, including refreshment rooms, a kitchen, 180 ft (55 m) long passenger platform, cart access to the platform, 40 ft (12 m) by 30 ft (9.1 m) goods shed, loading bank, cattle yards, stationmaster's house, urinals and a passing loop for 46 wagons. Two years later there were also sheep yards, a crane and a water service. Water tanks had been proposed in 1878, about 100 feet beyond the platform. In 1910, after the NIMT opened, the need for more office accommodation was noted and a veranda and longer platform were requested, but rejected. There was a Post Office at the station from 1895 to 1914. A veranda was added in 1912 and was still in place in 1941. Gangers houses were built in 1916 and a State house in 1955.

An excursion train was derailed on the points at the station in 1902, with its WD Class loco.

=== Refreshment Rooms ===
From the start the choice of Halcombe, rather than Marton, for a refreshment stop had been criticised, by both Marton and Palmerston North, as had the route through Halcombe, rather than Sanson. Initially the trains spent over 40 minutes at the refreshment stop, but that was soon roughly halved. The refreshment rooms were leased; for example, in 1883-4 the lease was £20 a year, but only £12 in 1898. In 1878 they were run by the Halcombe Hotel. From Saturday 24 December 1898 they were replaced by rooms at Marton.

=== Services ===
The line became part of the NIMT, when it fully opened in 1909, and Halcombe was one of the stopping points for Wellington to New Plymouth expresses in 1910 and in the 1940s. In the 1920s the station was staffed by a grade 7 clerk.

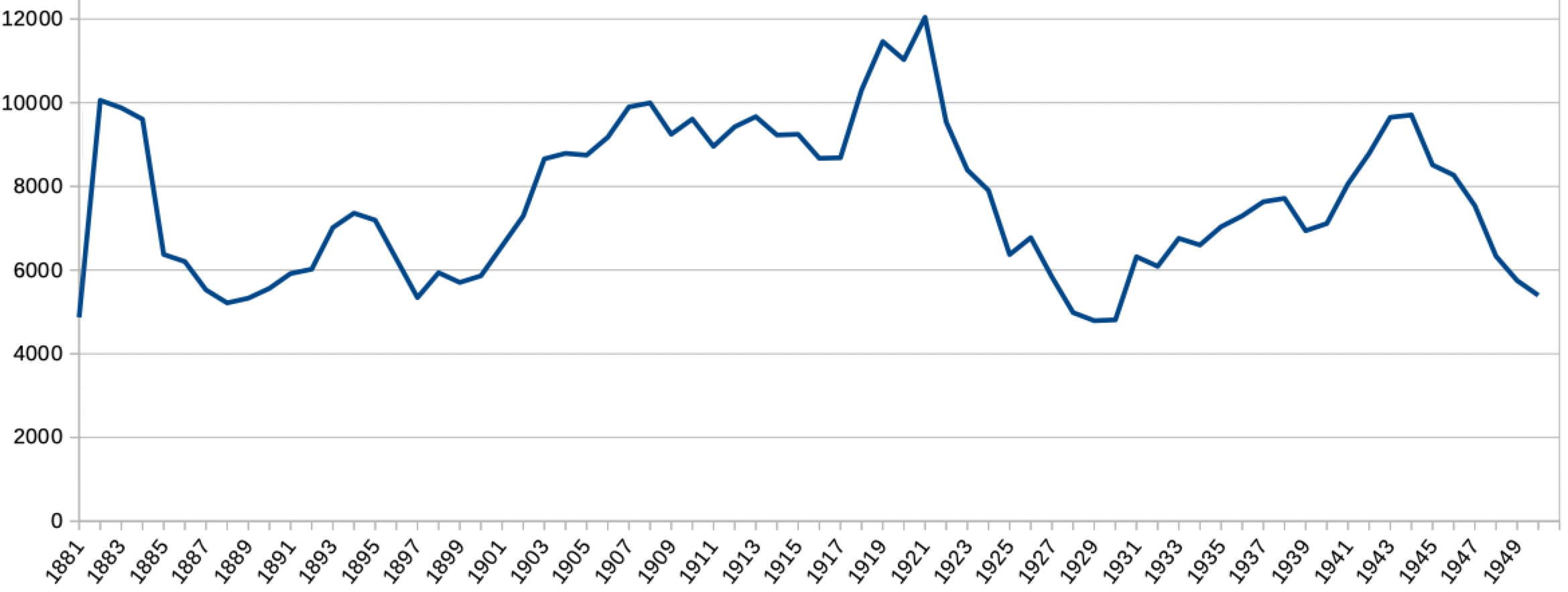
tickets sales 1880–1950 – derived from annual returns to Parliament of "Statement of Revenue for each Station for the Year ended"

Halcombe had its annual returns of traffic recorded, as did Greatford to the north and Feilding to the south. Passenger numbers grew initially and during the World Wars, before tailing off towards 1950, as shown in the graph and table below.

year	tickets	season tickets	staff	ref.
1881	4870		4	
1882	10056		4	
1883	9875		4	
1884	9606		4	
1885	6374		3	
1886	6204		3	
1887	5527		3	
1888	5217		3	
1889	5328	1	2	
1890	5564	3	3	
1891	5918	3	3	
1892	6021	7	3	
1893	7017	15	3	
1894	7361	9	3	
1895	7193	3	3	
1896				Page 11 missing
1897	5343	5	3	
1898	5938	5	3	
1899	5706	6	3	
1900	5862	8	3	
1901				Pages 30–35 missing
1902	7291	2	3	
1903	8658	5	3	
1904	8790	15	3	
1905	8747	27	3	
1906	9175	13	3	
1907	9897	8	3	
1908	9995	2	3	
1909	9245	9	11	
1910	9608	2	3	
1911	8957	14	3	
1912	9423	29	3	
1913	9666	30	4	
1914	9227	28		
1915	9245	40		
1916	8671	17		
1917	8685	72		
1918	10307	130		
1919	11461	155		
1920	11029	133		
1921	12039	90		
1922	9539	123		
1923	8393	165		
1924	7904	100		
1925	6371	66		
1926	6776	118		
1927	5835	84		
1928	4986	73		
1929	4791	76		
1930	4811	108		
1931	6319	100		
1932	6091	96		
1933	6758	50		
1934	6599	55		
1935	7036	50		
1936	7295	58		
1937	7633	87		
1938	7713	206		
1939	6941	193		
1940	7113	58		
1941	8060	63		
1942	8786	69		
1943	9649	61		
1944	9707	76		
1945	8513	87		
1946	8269	68		
1947	7538	83		
1948	6333	90		
1949	5749	53		
1950	5398	39		

=== Engine shed ===
A large engine shed was built as part of the J & C Bull contract. Nathan & Wilkie built an extra engine shed and coal store for £795.10.4 in 1878-79. Initially a winch and chain was used to lift engines. Another shed seems to have been added in 1894.

=== Closure ===
From Saturday 6 December 1958 Halcombe was closed as an officered station. On Saturday 31 March 1962 the station building burnt down and a small storeroom was used as a temporary station. Removal of the goods shed and stockyards was approved in 1973. Most of the station buildings had gone by 1974, though in 1980 a station building, platform and loading bank remained. On Sunday 27 March 1983 the station closed to all traffic, but a service siding remained.
