= Hiwinui =

Rural settlement in Manawatū-Whanganui Region, New Zealand

- Settlement
- Interactive map of Hiwinui
- Coordinates: 40.271°S 175.702°E
- Country: New Zealand
- Region: Manawatū-Whanganui
- District: Manawatū District
- Ward: Manawatū Rural General Ward; Ngā Tapuae o Matangi Māori Ward
- Electorates: Rangitīkei; Te Tai Hauāuru (Māori)

Government
  - Territorial Authority: Manawatū District Council
  - Regional council: Horizons Regional Council
  - Mayor of Manawatu: Michael Ford
  - Rangitīkei MP: Suze Redmayne
  - Te Tai Hauāuru MP: Debbie Ngarewa-Packer

Area
  - Total: 2.42 km^{2} (0.93 sq mi)
- Elevation: 204 m (669 ft)

Population (June 2025)
  - Total: 410
  - Density: 170/km^{2} (440/sq mi)

Hiwinui is a settlement in Manawatū District, in the Manawatū-Whanganui region in New Zealand's central North Island.

"Hiwinui" means "big ridge" in the Māori language.

== History ==
The Hiwinui area was originally settled by the Rangitāne iwi. Land was purchased by the government in the 1860s and resold to pākehā settlers, who converted the forest to farmland.

== Demographics ==
Hiwinui is described by Stats NZ as a rural settlement. It covers 2.42 km^{2} (0.93 sq mi) and had an estimated population of 410 as of June 2025, with a population density of 169 people per km^{2}. It is part of the larger Taonui statistical area.

Historical population for Hiwinui
Year	Pop.	±% p.a.
2006	174	—
2013	243	+4.89%
2018	336	+6.70%
2023	384	+2.71%

Hiwinui had a population of 384 in the 2023 New Zealand census, an increase of 48 people (14.3%) since the 2018 census, and an increase of 141 people (58.0%) since the 2013 census. There were 189 males, 192 females, and 3 people of other genders in 111 dwellings. 1.6% of people identified as LGBTIQ+. The median age was 38.4 years (compared with 38.1 years nationally). There were 108 people (28.1%) aged under 15 years, 45 (11.7%) aged 15 to 29, 189 (49.2%) aged 30 to 64, and 42 (10.9%) aged 65 or older.

People could identify as more than one ethnicity. The results were 95.3% European (Pākehā), 11.7% Māori, 1.6% Pasifika, 1.6% Asian, and 3.9% other, which includes people giving their ethnicity as "New Zealander". English was spoken by 98.4%, Māori by 1.6%, and other languages by 4.7%. No language could be spoken by 2.3% (e.g. too young to talk). The percentage of people born overseas was 10.9, compared with 28.8% nationally.

The sole religious affiliation given was 21.9% Christian. People who answered that they had no religion were 72.7%, and 5.5% of people did not answer the census question.

Of those at least 15 years old, 84 (30.4%) people had a bachelor's or higher degree, 159 (57.6%) had a post-high school certificate or diploma, and 36 (13.0%) people exclusively held high school qualifications. The median income was $60,700, compared with $41,500 nationally. 60 people (21.7%) earned over $100,000 compared to 12.1% nationally. The employment status of those at least 15 was 159 (57.6%) full-time, 42 (15.2%) part-time, and 3 (1.1%) unemployed.

=== Taonui statistical area ===
Taonui statistical area, which also includes Colyton, covers 165.77 km^{2} (64.00 sq mi) and had an estimated population of 2,120 as of June 2025, with a population density of 13 people per km^{2}.

Historical population for Taonui
Year	Pop.	±% p.a.
2006	1,230	—
2013	1,437	+2.25%
2018	1,599	+2.16%
2023	1,965	+4.21%

Taonui had a population of 1,965 in the 2023 New Zealand census, an increase of 366 people (22.9%) since the 2018 census, and an increase of 528 people (36.7%) since the 2013 census. There were 981 males, 975 females, and 9 people of other genders in 663 dwellings. 1.7% of people identified as LGBTIQ+. The median age was 40.0 years (compared with 38.1 years nationally). There were 453 people (23.1%) aged under 15 years, 276 (14.0%) aged 15 to 29, 966 (49.2%) aged 30 to 64, and 270 (13.7%) aged 65 or older.

People could identify as more than one ethnicity. The results were 93.3% European (Pākehā); 13.1% Māori; 2.0% Pasifika; 2.1% Asian; 0.2% Middle Eastern, Latin American and African New Zealanders (MELAA); and 4.3% other, which includes people giving their ethnicity as "New Zealander". English was spoken by 97.7%, Māori by 2.7%, Samoan by 0.9%, and other languages by 5.3%. No language could be spoken by 2.0% (e.g. too young to talk). New Zealand Sign Language was known by 0.8%. The percentage of people born overseas was 11.0, compared with 28.8% nationally.

Religious affiliations were 28.5% Christian, 0.3% Islam, 0.3% Māori religious beliefs, 0.2% Buddhist, 0.3% New Age, and 0.8% other religions. People who answered that they had no religion were 62.1%, and 7.6% of people did not answer the census question.

Of those at least 15 years old, 369 (24.4%) people had a bachelor's or higher degree, 891 (58.9%) had a post-high school certificate or diploma, and 252 (16.7%) people exclusively held high school qualifications. The median income was $53,500, compared with $41,500 nationally. 255 people (16.9%) earned over $100,000 compared to 12.1% nationally. The employment status of those at least 15 was 900 (59.5%) full-time, 267 (17.7%) part-time, and 18 (1.2%) unemployed.

== Education ==
Hiwinui School is a co-educational state primary school for Year 1 to 8 students. It has a roll of 131 as of July 2026. The school opened in 1891.
