= Himatangi Beach =

Settlement in Manawatū-Whanganui Region, New Zealand

- Town
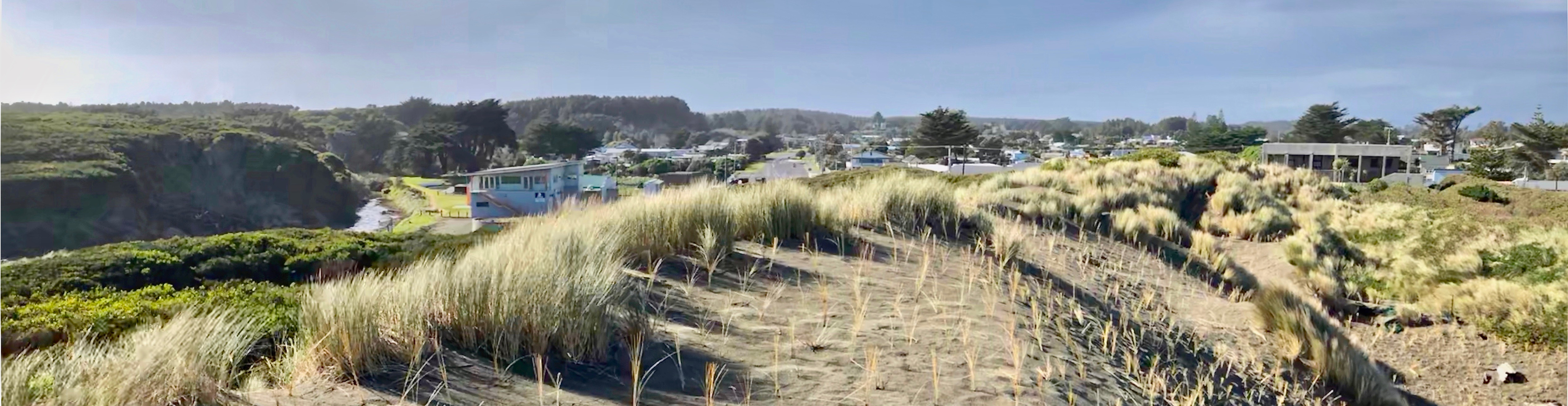
- Himatangi Beach and Kaikokopu Stream from the dunes
- Interactive map of Himatangi Beach
- Coordinates: 40°22′18″S 175°14′06″E
- Country: New Zealand
- Region: Manawatū-Whanganui
- District: Manawatū District
- Ward: Manawatū Rural General Ward; Ngā Tapuae o Matangi Māori Ward
- Settled: Early 1700s
- Electorates: Rangitīkei; Te Tai Hauāuru (Māori)

Government
  - Territorial authority: Manawatū District Council
  - Regional council: Horizons Regional Council
  - Mayor of Manawatu: Michael Ford
  - Rangitīkei MP: Suze Redmayne
  - Te Tai Hauāuru MP: Debbie Ngarewa-Packer

Area
  - Total: 0.95 km^{2} (0.37 sq mi)

Population (June 2025)
  - Total: 590
  - Density: 620/km^{2} (1,600/sq mi)
- Time zone: UTC-12 (NZST)
- Postal code: 5551

Himatangi Beach is a small coastal community in the Manawatū District of New Zealand's North Island. It is located 32 kilometres west of Palmerston North, and seven kilometres west of Himatangi, in the centre of the largest sand dune geographical feature in New Zealand.

== Demographics ==
Himatangi Beach is described by Stats NZ as a rural settlement. It covers 0.95 km^{2} (0.37 sq mi) and had an estimated population of 590 as of June 2025, with a population density of 621 people per km^{2}. It is part of the larger Oroua Downs statistical area.

Historical population
Year	Pop.	±% p.a.
2006	447	—
2013	429	−0.59%
2018	510	+3.52%
2023	540	+1.15%

Himatangi Beach had a population of 540 in the 2023 New Zealand census, an increase of 30 people (5.9%) since the 2018 census, and an increase of 111 people (25.9%) since the 2013 census. There were 285 males, 252 females, and 6 people of other genders in 261 dwellings. 3.3% of people identified as LGBTIQ+. The median age was 56.1 years (compared with 38.1 years nationally). There were 51 people (9.4%) aged under 15 years, 57 (10.6%) aged 15 to 29, 303 (56.1%) aged 30 to 64, and 129 (23.9%) aged 65 or older.

People could identify as more than one ethnicity. The results were 90.0% European (Pākehā), 20.6% Māori, 1.7% Pasifika, 1.1% Asian, and 4.4% other, which includes people giving their ethnicity as "New Zealander". English was spoken by 98.9%, Māori by 3.9%, Samoan by 0.6%, and other languages by 3.3%. No language could be spoken by 0.6% (e.g. too young to talk). The percentage of people born overseas was 10.0, compared with 28.8% nationally.

Religious affiliations were 25.0% Christian, 0.6% Hindu, 1.7% Māori religious beliefs, 0.6% Buddhist, 1.1% New Age, and 1.1% other religions. People who answered that they had no religion were 60.6%, and 10.0% of people did not answer the census question.

Of those at least 15 years old, 60 (12.3%) people had a bachelor's or higher degree, 282 (57.7%) had a post-high school certificate or diploma, and 150 (30.7%) people exclusively held high school qualifications. The median income was $39,800, compared with $41,500 nationally. 45 people (9.2%) earned over $100,000 compared to 12.1% nationally. The employment status of those at least 15 was 243 (49.7%) full-time, 60 (12.3%) part-time, and 9 (1.8%) unemployed.

The population increases to several thousand in the summer.
