= Sanson, New Zealand =

Settlement in Manawatū-Whanganui Region, New Zealand

Sanson
- Town
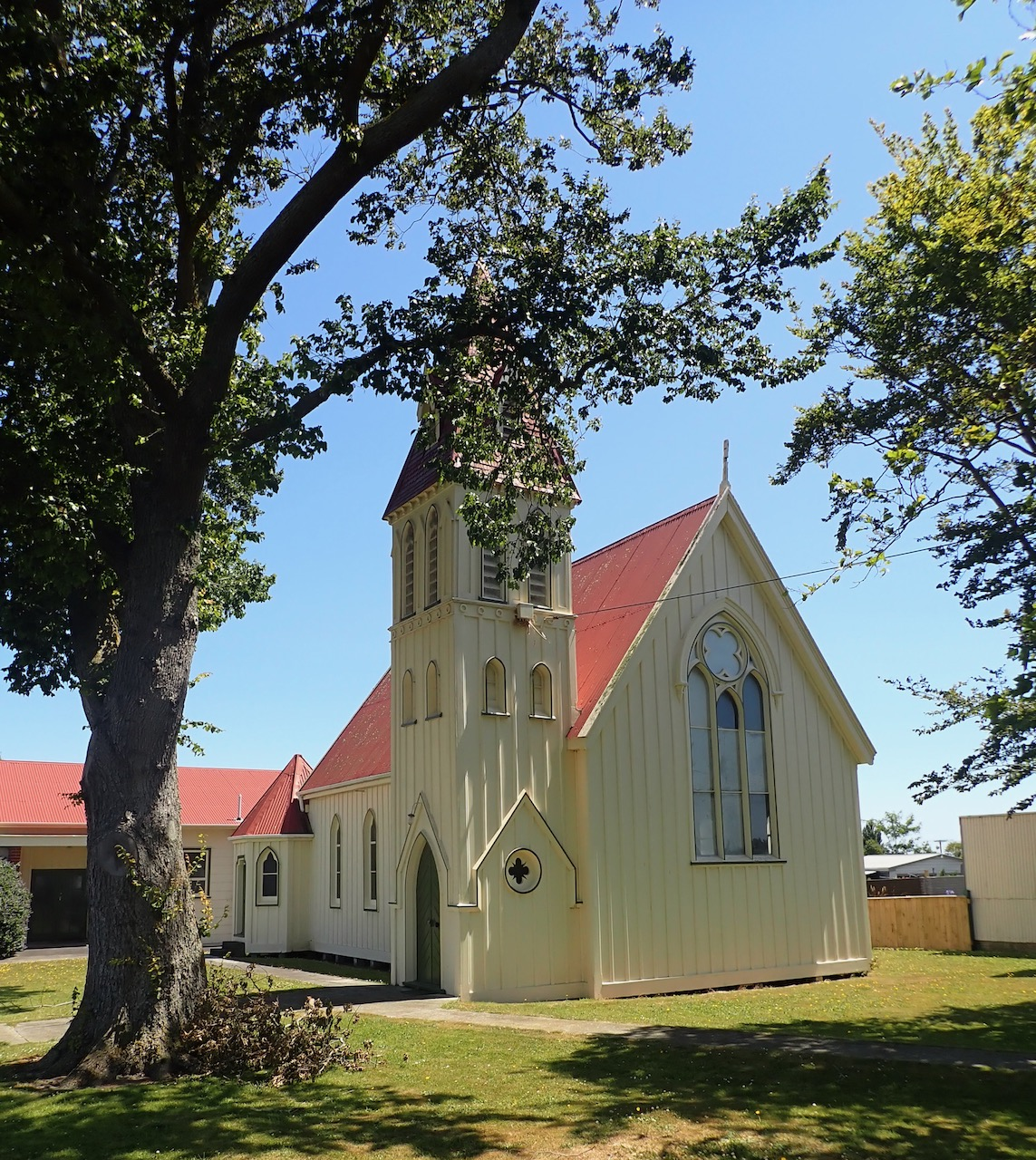
- St Thomas' Anglican Church, built in 1877
- Interactive map of Sanson
- Coordinates: 40°13′13″S 175°25′27″E
- Country: New Zealand
- Region: Manawatū-Whanganui
- District: Manawatū District
- Ward: Manawatū Rural General Ward; Ngā Tapuae o Matangi Māori Ward
- Named for: Henry Sanson
- Electorates: Rangitīkei; Te Tai Hauāuru (Māori)

Government
  - Territorial Authority: Manawatū District Council
  - Regional council: Horizons Regional Council
  - Mayor of Manawatu: Michael Ford
  - Rangitīkei MP: Suze Redmayne
  - Te Tai Hauāuru MP: Debbie Ngarewa-Packer

Area
  - Total: 0.60 km^{2} (0.23 sq mi)

Population (June 2025)
  - Total: 680
  - Density: 1,100/km^{2} (2,900/sq mi)
- Postcode: 4817

Sanson is a small settlement in the Manawatū District of New Zealand. It is located just south of Bulls and the Rangitīkei River, and west of the city of Palmerston North.

Two major roads of the New Zealand state highway network meet in Sanson, State Highways 1 and 3. From 1885 until 1945, the Sanson Tramway provided a link with the national rail network, running south to meet the now-closed Foxton Branch in Himatangi.

== History ==
European settlement in the area began with the New Zealand Government's sale of the Sandon Block in the late 1860s. The block was designated an urban township rather than a rural block, as soldiers were not permitted to buy urban land.

The Sandon block was settled from the Hutt Valley, and named after Hutt Small Farm Association secretary Henry Sanson.

A photo in the National Library of New Zealand shows the settlement in the 1870s, with a few houses, a church and some other buildings on a single main road. Another photograph shows the church alongside a two-storied house, with a picket fence and a horse tied to a gate.

The township of Sanson was the terminus of a tramway, with ran from a junction with the railway line at Hīmatangi from 1883 to 1945.

The tram line is depicted in a photograph in the early 20th century. On one side of the tram line are wooden buildings; on the other is an unpaved street, a two-storey store, and a local hotel.

By 2006, the town was a highway stop with several craft and antique shops.

== Demographics ==
Sanson is described by Stats NZ as a rural settlement. It covers 0.60 km^{2} (0.23 sq mi) and had an estimated population of 680 as of June 2025, with a population density of 1,133 people per km^{2}. It is part of the larger Ohakea-Sanson statistical area.

Historical population for Sanson
Year	Pop.	±% p.a.
2006	492	—
2013	537	+1.26%
2018	588	+1.83%
2023	636	+1.58%

Sanson had a population of 636 in the 2023 New Zealand census, an increase of 48 people (8.2%) since the 2018 census, and an increase of 99 people (18.4%) since the 2013 census. There were 339 males and 300 females in 252 dwellings. 3.3% of people identified as LGBTIQ+. The median age was 39.0 years (compared with 38.1 years nationally). There were 105 people (16.5%) aged under 15 years, 123 (19.3%) aged 15 to 29, 318 (50.0%) aged 30 to 64, and 90 (14.2%) aged 65 or older.

People could identify as more than one ethnicity. The results were 82.5% European (Pākehā), 24.1% Māori, 6.6% Pasifika, 6.6% Asian, and 4.7% other, which includes people giving their ethnicity as "New Zealander". English was spoken by 97.6%, Māori by 3.8%, Samoan by 0.5%, and other languages by 5.7%. No language could be spoken by 1.9% (e.g. too young to talk). New Zealand Sign Language was known by 0.9%. The percentage of people born overseas was 13.7, compared with 28.8% nationally.

Religious affiliations were 23.6% Christian, 0.5% Hindu, 1.9% Islam, 1.9% Māori religious beliefs, 0.5% New Age, and 1.4% other religions. People who answered that they had no religion were 59.9%, and 9.4% of people did not answer the census question.

Of those at least 15 years old, 42 (7.9%) people had a bachelor's or higher degree, 330 (62.1%) had a post-high school certificate or diploma, and 162 (30.5%) people exclusively held high school qualifications. The median income was $43,000, compared with $41,500 nationally. 24 people (4.5%) earned over $100,000 compared to 12.1% nationally. The employment status of those at least 15 was 297 (55.9%) full-time, 69 (13.0%) part-time, and 18 (3.4%) unemployed.

=== Ohakea-Sanson statistical area ===
Ohakea-Sanson statistical area, which also includes Ohakea, covers 82.45 km^{2} (31.83 sq mi) and had an estimated population of 1,410 as of June 2025, with a population density of 17 people per km^{2}.

Historical population for Ohakea-Sanson
Year	Pop.	±% p.a.
2006	1,122	—
2013	1,230	+1.32%
2018	1,290	+0.96%
2023	1,317	+0.42%

Ōhakea-Sanson had a population of 1,317 in the 2023 New Zealand census, an increase of 27 people (2.1%) since the 2018 census, and an increase of 87 people (7.1%) since the 2013 census. There were 711 males, 603 females, and 3 people of other genders in 480 dwellings. 3.2% of people identified as LGBTIQ+. The median age was 37.0 years (compared with 38.1 years nationally). There were 243 people (18.5%) aged under 15 years, 264 (20.0%) aged 15 to 29, 642 (48.7%) aged 30 to 64, and 168 (12.8%) aged 65 or older.

People could identify as more than one ethnicity. The results were 87.0% European (Pākehā); 18.2% Māori; 3.4% Pasifika; 5.0% Asian; 0.2% Middle Eastern, Latin American and African New Zealanders (MELAA); and 4.3% other, which includes people giving their ethnicity as "New Zealander". English was spoken by 97.5%, Māori by 3.0%, Samoan by 0.2%, and other languages by 5.0%. No language could be spoken by 2.1% (e.g. too young to talk). New Zealand Sign Language was known by 0.7%. The percentage of people born overseas was 14.4, compared with 28.8% nationally.

Religious affiliations were 23.0% Christian, 0.2% Hindu, 1.8% Islam, 0.9% Māori religious beliefs, 0.2% Buddhist, 0.7% New Age, and 1.1% other religions. People who answered that they had no religion were 62.6%, and 9.6% of people did not answer the census question.

Of those at least 15 years old, 153 (14.2%) people had a bachelor's or higher degree, 663 (61.7%) had a post-high school certificate or diploma, and 258 (24.0%) people exclusively held high school qualifications. The median income was $50,300, compared with $41,500 nationally. 96 people (8.9%) earned over $100,000 compared to 12.1% nationally. The employment status of those at least 15 was 672 (62.6%) full-time, 132 (12.3%) part-time, and 21 (2.0%) unemployed.

== Education ==
Sanson School lies at the southern end of the township off State Highway 1. The school is a co-educational state primary school for Year 1 to 8 students, with a roll of 24 as of July 2026. The school opened in 1873, and relocated in 1991 to what was the Manawatu County Council building.

At the front of the old Sanson School building, located on State Highway 3 on the western boundary of the township (Dundas Road) is the Sanson Memorial Gate; erected to the memory of soldiers who died in World War I. It was unveiled on 31 August 1924 and lists the names of twelve deceased soldiers.

The nearest secondary school (year 9–13) is Feilding High School, 17 km (11 mi) away in Feilding.

== Blokart ==
The Manawatū Blokart Club is based in Sanson. In 2022, the club hosted the Blokarting 2022 New Zealand National Championships and the World Championships. The 5 day World Championship event saw two days of competition at the Sanson blokart track and three days held on the airfield tarmac at the nearby RNZAF Base Ohakea.
