= Tangimoana =

Settlement in Manawatū-Whanganui Region, New Zealand

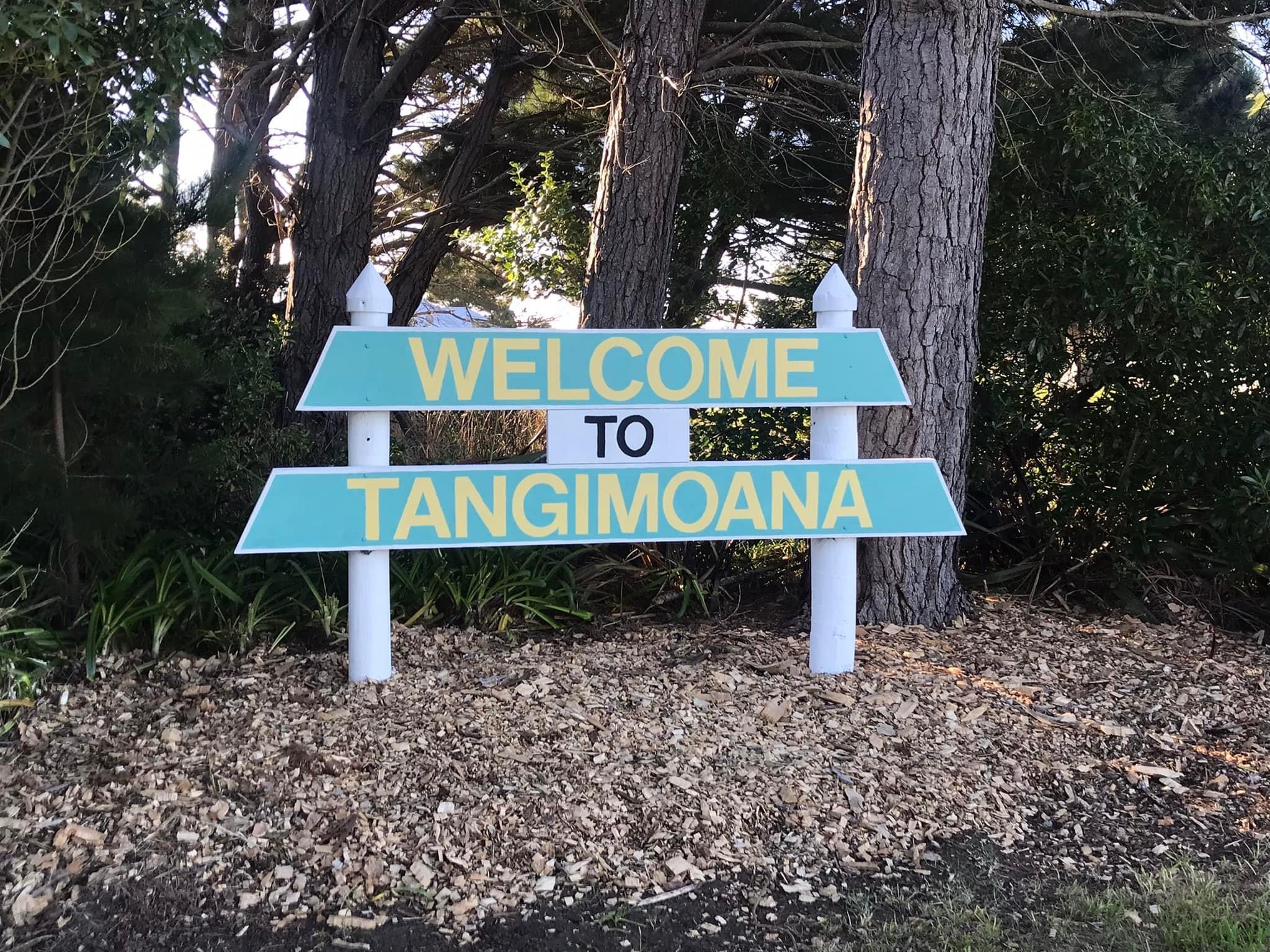
- Interactive map of Tangimoana
- Coordinates: 40°18′S 175°15′E
- Country: New Zealand
- Region: Manawatū-Whanganui
- District: Manawatū District
- Ward: Manawatū Rural General Ward; Ngā Tapuae o Matangi Māori Ward
- Electorates: Rangitīkei; Te Tai Hauāuru (Māori)

Government
  - Territorial Authority: Manawatū District Council
  - Regional council: Horizons Regional Council
  - Mayor of Manawatu: Michael Ford
  - Rangitīkei MP: Suze Redmayne
  - Te Tai Hauāuru MP: Debbie Ngarewa-Packer

Area
  - Total: 0.53 km^{2} (0.20 sq mi)

Population (June 2025)
  - Total: 380
  - Density: 720/km^{2} (1,900/sq mi)
- Postcode(s): 4822

Tangimoana is a community in the Manawatū-Whanganui Region of the North Island of New Zealand. It had a population of 303 permanent residents in 2018. It is located 15 kilometres southwest of Bulls, and 30 kilometres west of Palmerston North.

The New Zealand Ministry for Culture and Heritage gives a translation of "weeping sea" for Tangimoana.

The settlement lies on the southern bank of the Rangitīkei River near the mouth. It was developed in 1920 as a holiday place for people from Palmerston North and other inland towns and sections sold from 1921.

The Boating Club has a licensed facility for members and their guests. A small corner store is open daily, it sells basic supplies as well as takeaway food.

Tangimoana is popular with those seeking an alternative lifestyle. Many residents are artists and once a year they hold an Art Festival to showcase their works along with Art and Craft Markets during the year in the McKelvie Hall.

On Saturday morning the McKelvie Hall is open to access the community library. The library consists of many donated books as well as books from the Feilding Library which are regularly changed.

Tangimoana has limited facilities and very few employment opportunities. Most residents travel to Palmerston North, Feilding or Levin for employment. The main attraction is the river and beach which are both peaceful and natural. It is a popular beach for horses and dogs. A four-wheel drive vehicle is needed to drive directly to the ocean.

== Demographics ==
Tangimoana is described by Stats NZ as a rural settlement. It covers 0.53 km^{2} (0.20 sq mi) and had an estimated population of 380 as of June 2025, with a population density of 717 people per km^{2}. It is part of the larger Oroua Downs statistical area.

Historical population
Year	Pop.	±% p.a.
2006	276	—
2013	228	−2.69%
2018	303	+5.85%
2023	366	+3.85%

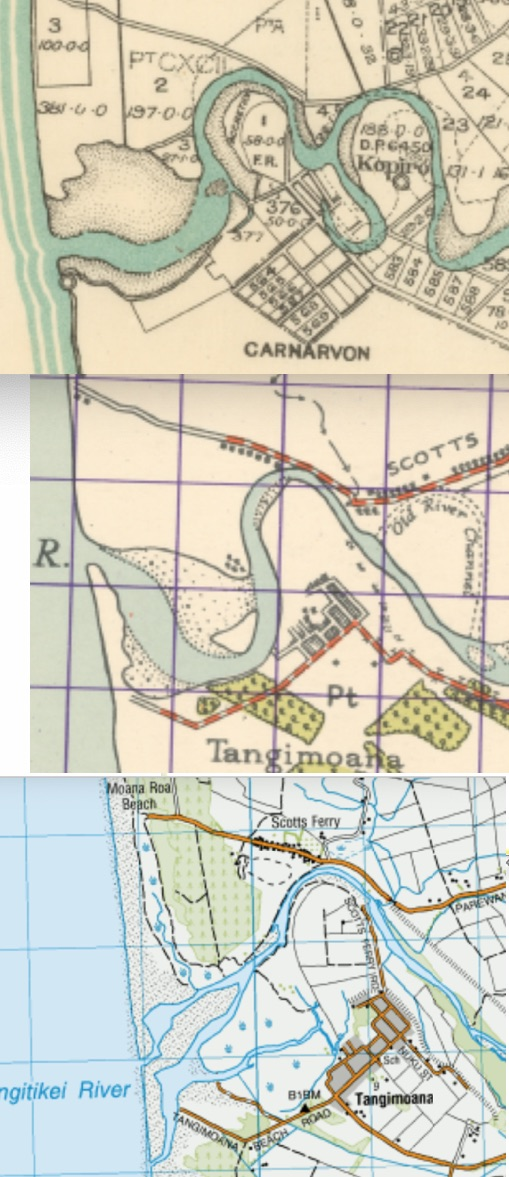
Tangimoana and Rangitīkei estuary maps in 1928, 1942 and 2018, showing the shortening of the river's course

Tangimoana had a population of 366 in the 2023 New Zealand census, an increase of 63 people (20.8%) since the 2018 census, and an increase of 138 people (60.5%) since the 2013 census. There were 180 males and 186 females in 150 dwellings. 4.1% of people identified as LGBTIQ+. The median age was 47.0 years (compared with 38.1 years nationally). There were 60 people (16.4%) aged under 15 years, 48 (13.1%) aged 15 to 29, 183 (50.0%) aged 30 to 64, and 75 (20.5%) aged 65 or older.

People could identify as more than one ethnicity. The results were 86.1% European (Pākehā), 21.3% Māori, 4.9% Pasifika, 1.6% Asian, and 4.9% other, which includes people giving their ethnicity as "New Zealander". English was spoken by 97.5%, Māori by 3.3%, Samoan by 2.5%, and other languages by 4.1%. No language could be spoken by 1.6% (e.g. too young to talk). New Zealand Sign Language was known by 0.8%. The percentage of people born overseas was 11.5, compared with 28.8% nationally.

Religious affiliations were 19.7% Christian, 0.8% New Age, and 1.6% other religions. People who answered that they had no religion were 67.2%, and 10.7% of people did not answer the census question.

Of those at least 15 years old, 27 (8.8%) people had a bachelor's or higher degree, 180 (58.8%) had a post-high school certificate or diploma, and 99 (32.4%) people exclusively held high school qualifications. The median income was $33,900, compared with $41,500 nationally. 6 people (2.0%) earned over $100,000 compared to 12.1% nationally. The employment status of those at least 15 was 150 (49.0%) full-time, 39 (12.7%) part-time, and 3 (1.0%) unemployed.

== Education ==
Tangimoana School is a coeducational full primary (years 1–8) school with a roll of 16 as of July 2026. The school opened in 1934, and moved to its current location in 1936.

The bus service that has taken secondary school students into Palmerston North on weekdays since the Carnarvon bus was extended to Tangimoana in 1924. was cancelled by the Ministry of Education in 2025. This has created ongoing issues for students as they can no longer get to secondary school.

== SIGINT facility ==
The New Zealand Government Communications Security Bureau operates what it describes as a radio communications interception facility in the area; it is generally believed to be a signals intelligence, or SIGINT facility operating under umbrella of the ECHELON espionage network, under the auspices the UKUSA consortium of intelligent agencies. The facility was built from 1980 and cost about NZ$1.4 million. The history of the site was restricted for 100 years, but a copy of the document was accidentally sent to Archives New Zealand.

== Geography ==
=== Natural Hazards ===
Tangimoana faces a notably high risk of flooding. Horizons Regional Council discourages new houses being built in the settlement.

Tangimoana was among the most seriously affected communities in the 2004 flooding. Other notable floods were in 1882, 1897, 1917, 1936, 1958 and 1965. In 1944 and 1967 cuttings were made to divert the river away from the village, and stopbanks were built and extended in 2010. The cuttings to shorten the river can be seen on the maps from 1928 to 2018.

=== Tawhirihoe Scientific Reserve ===
The Tawhirihoe Scientific Reserve exists to the south of Tangimoana, and is managed by Department of Conservation. The reserve aims to conserve remnants of the dune and wetland ecosystems in the estuary. Plants include the Nationally Critical dune plant, Pimelea actea. Despite attempts to keep motor vehicles off the dunes, damage is still being done.

=== Climate ===
Climate data for Tangimoana (1981–2010)
Month	Jan	Feb	Mar	Apr	May	Jun	Jul	Aug	Sep	Oct	Nov	Dec	Year
Mean daily maximum °C (°F)	22.1 (71.8)	22.5 (72.5)	21.2 (70.2)	18.5 (65.3)	15.9 (60.6)	13.6 (56.5)	12.9 (55.2)	13.7 (56.7)	15.1 (59.2)	16.3 (61.3)	18.3 (64.9)	20.6 (69.1)	17.6 (63.6)
Daily mean °C (°F)	17.5 (63.5)	17.6 (63.7)	16.1 (61.0)	13.6 (56.5)	11.3 (52.3)	9.3 (48.7)	8.3 (46.9)	9.1 (48.4)	10.9 (51.6)	12.3 (54.1)	13.9 (57.0)	16.2 (61.2)	13.0 (55.4)
Mean daily minimum °C (°F)	12.9 (55.2)	12.7 (54.9)	11.0 (51.8)	8.6 (47.5)	6.7 (44.1)	4.9 (40.8)	3.7 (38.7)	4.4 (39.9)	6.6 (43.9)	8.3 (46.9)	9.5 (49.1)	11.8 (53.2)	8.4 (47.2)
Average rainfall mm (inches)	63 (2.5)	57 (2.2)	66 (2.6)	63 (2.5)	83 (3.3)	82 (3.2)	90 (3.5)	78 (3.1)	71 (2.8)	72 (2.8)	61 (2.4)	85 (3.3)	871 (34.2)
Source: NIWA (rainfall 1961–1990)
