= Ian McKelvie =

New Zealand politician (born 1952)

Ian McKelvie MNZM
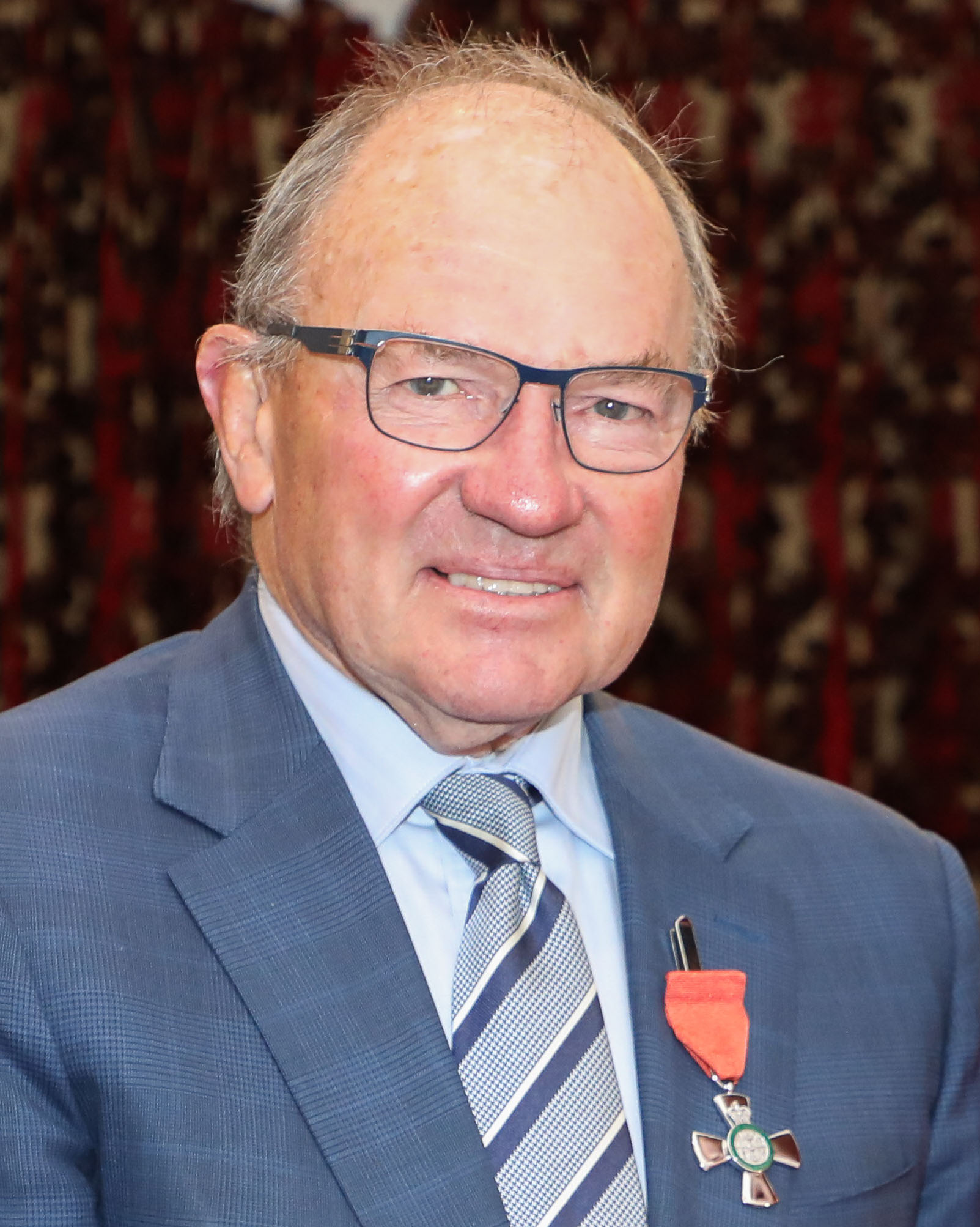
- McKelvie in 2025

Third Assistant Speaker of the New Zealand House of Representatives
- In office 1 March 2022 – 8 September 2023
- Speaker: Trevor Mallard (2022); Adrian Rurawhe (2022–2023)
- Preceded by: Position created

Member of the New Zealand Parliament for Rangitīkei
- In office 30 November 2011 – 14 October 2023
- Preceded by: Simon Power
- Succeeded by: Suze Redmayne
- Majority: 2,961

4th Mayor of Manawatu
- In office November 2002 – 15 December 2011
- Preceded by: Audrey Severinsen
- Succeeded by: Margaret Kouvelis

Personal details
- Born: Ian Robert Flockhart McKelvie; 1952 (age 73–74) Palmerston North, New Zealand
- Party: National Party
- Spouse: Sue
- Education: Massey University
- Profession: Farmer and politician
- Website: www.ianmckelvie.co.nz

Ian Robert Flockhart McKelvie MNZM (born 1952) is a New Zealand politician. He represented the National Party in the New Zealand House of Representatives from 2011 to 2023.

== Early life and career ==
McKelvie was born to parents John and Rosemary in Palmerston North. His family has lived near the Rangitīkei river since 1850. He was educated at Wanganui Collegiate School. He then gained a Diploma of Agriculture from Massey University and worked on several farms, including a sheep, beef, dairy and cropping farm at Tangimoana with one of his brothers. He has also worked in the motor vehicle, property and insurance industries, including with Farmers’ Mutual Group, and served as national president of the Royal Agricultural Society for four years until 2002.

He was the Mayor of Manawatu from 2002 until 2011. He resigned from the position on being elected to Parliament. As of 2025, he is the longest-serving former mayor of the district, being in office for 9 years and 20 days.

He served as the board chair of Special Olympics New Zealand from October 2010 until 2019.

As at June 2020, McKelvie served as the Patron of the Manawatū chapter of the equestrian charity Riding for the Disabled.

== Member of Parliament ==
New Zealand Parliament
Years	Term	Electorate	List	Party
2011–2014	50th	Rangitīkei	58	National
2014–2017	51st	Rangitīkei	41	National
2017–2020	52nd	Rangitīkei	37	National
2020–2023	53rd	Rangitīkei	38	National

=== Fifth National Government, 2011–2017 ===
McKelvie was named as the National Party candidate for the Rangitīkei electorate following the announcement by sitting member Simon Power of his retirement from politics. At the 2011 election, McKelvie won the seat with a majority of 9,382 ahead of Labour's Josie Pagani. He served on three select committees: primary production, regulations review, and law and order.

McKelvie was re-elected in the Rangitīkei electorate during the 2014 New Zealand general election with an increased majority. Following the 2014 general election, McKelvie served a second term on the law and order committee and was chair of the primary production committee.

=== Sixth Labour Government, 2017–2023 ===
McKelvie was re-elected in the Rangitīkei electorate during the 2017 New Zealand general election. Following the formation of a Labour-led coalition government, McKelvie served as the National Party's spokesperson on seniors' and veterans' issues between 3 November 2017 and 12 March 2018. He also served on the transport and infrastructure committees between November 2017 and March 2018. From March 2019 to November 2020 he was National's spokesperson for fisheries and racing and was a member of the finance and expenditure committee.

McKelvie's first member's bill was introduced to Parliament in June 2018. The Sentencing (Livestock Rustling) Amendment Bill proposed that livestock rustling would be considered as an aggravating factor at sentencing, thereby increasing penalties on the crime. The Bill passed its first reading in January 2018 and proceeded to consideration by the primary production committee, but was withdrawn from the House by McKelvie after the Government agreed to make the change through a Government amendment to the Crimes Act 1961.

On 11 December 2019, McKelvie's Dog Control (Category 1 Offences) Amendment Bill passed its first reading with the support of all parties except the Green Party. This amendment means that low-level offences involving dogs including animal cruelty will be heard by a justice of the peace or community magistrate rather than going through the district courts. The bill subsequently passed its third reading and received royal assent in December 2019.

During the 2020 New Zealand general election, McKelvie was re-elected in Rangitīkei by a final margin of 2,961 votes. After the election he continued as racing spokesperson and also picked up the forestry and seniors portfolios. He was also chairperson of the governance and administration committee and, on 1 March 2022, was appointed as an additional Assistant Speaker, to serve while the House is sitting with MPs participating remotely during the COVID-19 pandemic.

On 20 October 2021, McKelvie's third member's bill, the Sale and Supply of Alcohol (Exemption for Race Meetings) Amendment Bill, was introduced. This bill proposed that attendees of racing club meetings be permitted to bring their own alcohol. McKelvie stated that the proposed loosening of alcohol rules was designed to promote attendance at races. The bill completed its third reading on 8 June, passing 74–43 on a conscience vote.

In late July 2022, McKelvie announced that he would retire at the 2023 New Zealand general election. His successor in Rangitikei was the National Party candidate Suze Redmayne, who had been a staff member in McKelvie's office.

In the 2025 King’s Birthday Honours, McKelvie was appointed a Member of the New Zealand Order of Merit, for services to local government, governance and as a Member of Parliament. In May 2025 he was appointed as a community adviser at the Universal College of Learning.

== Political views ==
McKelvie has generally conservative views but has on occasion adopted more liberal positions on legislation that required a conscience vote. He supported the first reading of the Marriage (Definition of Marriage) Amendment Act 2013, but not the second or third reading, and supported the first and second reading of the Abortion Legislation Act 2020, but not the third reading. In his third reading speech on the Abortion Legislation Bill he said he was concerned that the Bill did not provide enough support for women or protections against abortions after 20 weeks. At the second reading of the Marriage (Definition of Marriage) Amendment Bill, he supported Winston Peters' amendments to prerequisite the Bill's passage on a successful referendum outcome.

He supported the End of Life Choice Act 2019, which legalised voluntary euthanasia, at all stages. He voted against Chlöe Swarbrick's member's bill to legalise medicinal cannabis in 2018. In 2025, he supported the retention of the Māori ward at Manawatu District Council.

New Zealand Parliament
Preceded by Simon Power	Member of Parliament for Rangitīkei; 2011–2023	Succeeded by Suze Redmayne
Political offices
Preceded by Audrey Severinsen	Mayor of Manawatu; 2002–2011	Succeeded by Margaret Kouvelis
