= Margaret Kouvelis =

New Zealand politician

Margaret Kouvelis MNZM
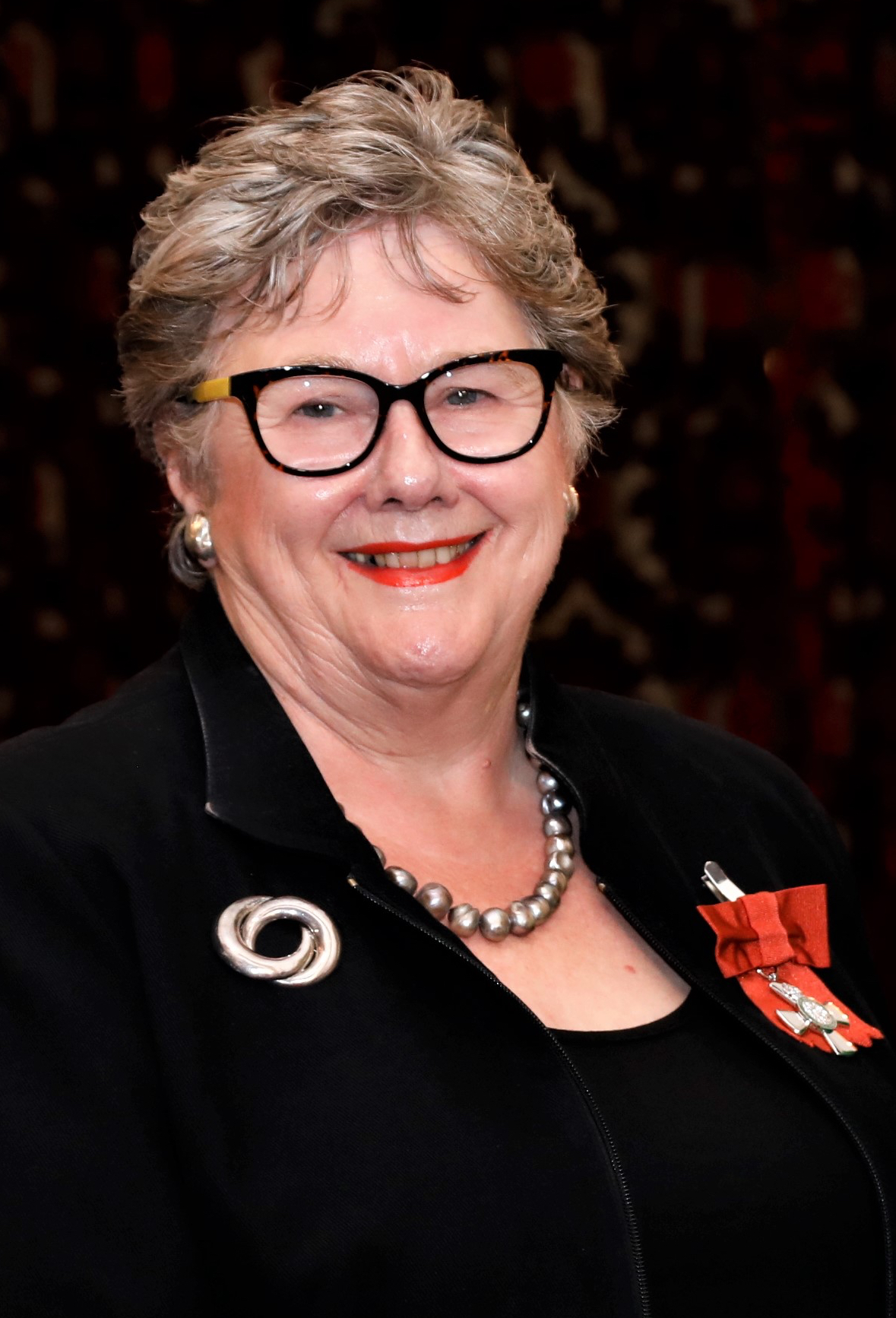
- Kouvelis in 2019

5th Mayor of Manawatu District
- In office 2012–2016
- Preceded by: Ian McKelvie
- Succeeded by: Helen Worboys

Personal details
- Born: 1949 (age 76–77) Nelson, New Zealand
- Relatives: Mark Ranby (son)

Margaret Joy Kouvelis MNZM (born 1949) is a New Zealand local-body politician. She was the 5th Mayor of Manawatu, holding the position from 2012 to 2016.

== Early life and family ==
Kouvelis was born in Nelson. She studied at the University of Auckland, and subsequently became a teacher in Queen's High School in Dunedin. After spending time in the United Kingdom, she was a teacher at Dunstan High School in Alexandra, and then at Freyberg High School in Palmerston North, before moving to Massey University's Centre for Educational Development. In 2002 she was appointed director of the New Zealand Teachers' Council, but resigned a year later. She subsequently became a consultant, edited a Presbyterian magazine, farmed olives, and ran a bookshop.

Kouvelis is the mother of former All Black Mark Ranby.

== Political career ==
In 2010 Kouvelis was elected to the Manawatu District Council. In 2012 she won a by-election for Mayor following the resignation of Ian McKelvie, and was re-elected unopposed in 2013, but lost the mayoralty to Helen Worboys in 2016.
