= Feltex Carpets =

Australian carpet manufacturer

Feltex Carpets Ltd
- Type: Subsidiary
- Industry: Carpet manufacturing
- Founded: Sydney, Australia, AUS (1921)
- Headquarters: Geelong, Melbourne, Australia
- Products: Feltex; Redbook; Redbook Green; Feltex Commercial; Feltex Woven; Feltex Tile
- Number of employees: 820 New Zealand; 500 Australian (October 2006)
- Website: www.feltex.com

Feltex Carpets (originally Felt and Textiles Limited) is an Australian manufacturer of residential and commercial carpets.

The company began its manufacturing operations in Australia in 1921, as Felt and Textiles of Australia Ltd. The company was publicly listed and acquired by Australian and New Zealand carpet manufacturer Godfrey Hirst Carpets after going into receivership in 2006. Its well-known residential brands in Australia and New Zealand include Feltex, Redbook and Redbook green. Commercial ranges include Feltex Commercial, Feltex Woven Axminster and Feltex tile.

Henri Van de Velde became managing director of Felt and Textiles in 1924, holding the position until his death in 1947. During this time the company expanded its product range and opened factories in New Zealand and South Africa. Felt and Textiles expanded into New Zealand in 1929 with the establishment of a subsidiary in Wellington called New Zealand Slippers.

A subsidiary of the company started weaving Axminster carpets in Sydney in 1938, the first time that woven carpet had been manufactured in Australia. The company also had wool-scouring mills and factories for processing cow hair for underfelts. By 1945, Felt and Textiles Australia and its subsidiaries were manufacturing carpet, many kinds of felt, including "Feltex" moth-proof floor coverings, cotton wool and wadding, woollen clothing and slippers. During World War II, the company made military boots and special hard felt for shell cases.

South African operations began with a slipper factory established in Durban in 1931, and, by 1941, the company claimed that most of the shoes and slippers worn in South Africa were made by Feltex. Around 27 percent of the company's net profits in 1960 came from South Africa, where it had 3,250 employees.

By 1966, Feltex products were being sold in 49 countries. In 2000, Feltex Carpets became Australasia's biggest carpet manufacturer after it bought out US-based Shaw Industries but, by 2005, the company was struggling and it went into receivership in 2006.

Factories in New Zealand were at Dannevirke, Feilding (closed 2009), Foxton (closed 2009), Kakariki yarn factory (closed 1997) Kakariki wool scouring plant (closed 2006), Gracefield in Lower Hutt, Riccarton (opened 1948, closed 2006) and Wainuiomata (closed 1997) Factories in Australia were at Tottenham, Hallam, Braybrook and Brooklyn in Victoria. In 1997, when the Wainuiomata and Kakariki yarn plants closed, the chief executive of Feltex Carpets stated that carpets made up 92 percent of Feltex's business while yarns were just 8 percent. The yarns business was struggling due to the high value of the dollar, a decline in hand knitting, and less use of wool in fashion fabrics.

== Community activity ==
From 1970 to 1985, Feltex sponsored the New Zealand Feltex Awards, which recognised technical and artistic achievement in television.
