= Rob Moodie (lawyer) =

New Zealand police officer, lawyer and politician

Miss Alice (born October 1938, previously known as Rob Moodie) is a New Zealand lawyer and former police officer and politician. He was mayor of Manawatu from 1995 to 1998 and twice stood unsuccessfully for Parliament under the United Future banner. He is also known for his wearing of kaftans during the 1980s while Police Association secretary, and female attire in the High Court and Court of Appeal in 2006.

== Early life and family ==
One of 10 children, Moodie was born in Dunedin in 1938. He was made a ward of the state following his father's death from tuberculosis and grew up in a boys' home from the age of seven. He was fostered by the Clyne family living near Oamaru and attended Waitaki Boys' High School. However, he did not do well at school and left aged 15. He worked as a freezing worker and a fencing contractor before deciding to join the police when he was 19.

== Police and legal careers ==
Moodie joined the New Zealand Police in 1959 and served as a detective in Wellington, rising to the rank of inspector. He then studied law at Victoria University of Wellington, graduating with first-class honours and subsequently completed a PhD in 1976.

From 1976 to 1986, he was secretary of the New Zealand Police Association and was awarded life membership in 1987.

Moodie acted for Keith and Margaret Berryman, whose farm was the scene of a bridge collapse that killed a visiting beekeeper in 1994. The Te Rata Bridge had been designed and built by the New Zealand Army, which disputed claims that the collapse was caused by poor design and construction and argued that the Berrymans were responsible for the collapse. Moodie lost the case in 2008 on nearly all points except a single paragraph of the coroner's report, which the High Court quashed.

== Political career ==
Moodie was elected mayor of Manawatu in 1995 and served one term. At the 1998 local-body elections, he stood for the mayoralties of both Manawatu District and Palmerston North, finishing third in Manawatu and 13th in Palmerston North.

At the 2002 general election, Moodie was the United Future candidate for the Wellington Central electorate and was ranked 40th on the party list. He gained 938 votes to finish in fifth position in Wellington Central and his list placing was too low for him to be elected.

In 2005, Moodie again stood for United Future, this time in the Rangitikei electorate. He came in fourth, polling 718 votes. He was not included on United Future's party list.

== Cross-dressing ==
A married heterosexual with three children, Moodie has said that he has a "strong female gender bias" and has always preferred women's clothes. He began wearing kaftans publicly in 1981 while secretary of the Police Association, as a statement about the macho culture of the New Zealand Police at the time.

In 2006, he wore women's clothing when appearing at the High Court in Wellington facing contempt charges arising from his release of a suppressed report during the Berryman case. He said that his attire was a "gender-bending protest against the male-dominated corruption of New Zealand's judicial system". He wore an Alice in Wonderland outfit before the Court of Appeal and officially changed his name to Miss Alice.

== Goat farming ==
Moodie began farming and breeding pedigree Angora and Boer goats on a property near Karori in Wellington in 1979. He later spent six years running a goat quarantine farm near Feilding.

== Documentary ==
A 52-minute documentary made about Moodie in 2009, titled Lost in Wonderland, was directed by Zoe McIntosh and produced by Costa Botes. It won awards for best cinematography and best popular documentary at the 2010 Qantas Film and Television Awards.

Political offices
Preceded by Caryll Clausen	Mayor of Manawatu; 1995–1998	Succeeded by Audrey Severinsen
