= Freyberg High School =

- Te Kura o Te Pou Hōia

Location
- Freyberg Street; Palmerston North, Manawatū-Whanganui, 4414; 40.3380°S 175.6275°E

Information
- School type: State co-educational
- Motto: Virtute et Honore
- Established: 1955
- Ministry of Education Institution no.: 200
- Principal: Graeme Williams
- Years taught: 9–13
- Enrolment: 952 (July 2026)
- Colours: █ Blue █ Gold
- Mascot: Salamander
- Socio-economic decile: 5M
- Website: www.freyberg.ac.nz

Freyberg High School (Māori: Te Kura o Te Pou Hōia) is a state co-educational secondary school located in the suburb of Roslyn in Palmerston North, New Zealand.

Freyberg High School is named for hero of both world wars, Lord Bernard Freyberg, who is known for his service in the Gallipoli Campaign during the First World War and later service commanding the New Zealand Expeditionary Force during the Second World War. Freyberg served as the 7th Governor-General of New Zealand from 1946 to 1952. Opening in 1955 as the city's fourth state secondary school, Freyberg High School is now one of the largest schools in Palmerston North, with a roll of 952 students as of July 2026, behind Palmerston North Boys' High School and Palmerston North Girls' High School.

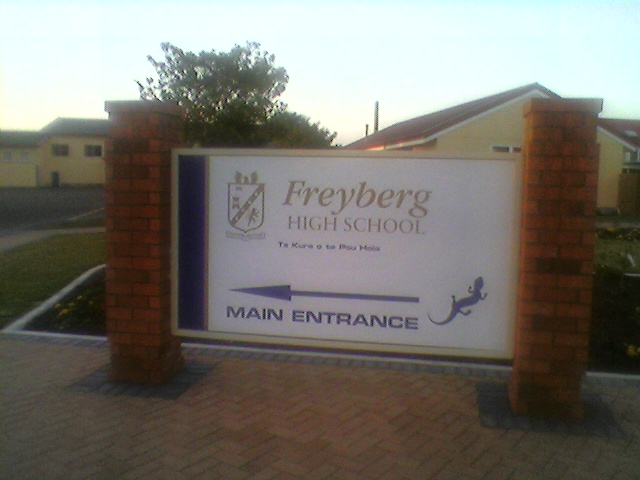
Main entrance to Freyberg High School

The school is located at the end of Freyberg Street, Palmerston North and is bordered by Skoglund Park on the east and Ross Intermediate School on the west. To the north are the netball courts of Vautier Park. Also present is the Freyberg Community Pool, which is open to the public for leisure.

== History ==
The school was founded in 1955 and named for World War II hero and former Governor General, Bernard Freyberg. His name is reflected not only in the name of the school, but also of the school's gymnasium, Lord Freyberg Memorial Gymnasium. In addition, the school's mascot is the salamander, which was Freyberg's nom de guerre during the First World War. The school's yearbook, the Salamander, also adopts this name. The name given to him by Māori, Te Pou Hōia, is also reflected in the Māori name for the school.

Like most New Zealand state secondary schools built in the mid-1950s, Freyberg High School is of Henderson-type construction, with long single-storey classrooms blocks of timber construction interconnected by a central spine. Additional classroom facilities have been built over the years to aid in the growing student numbers.

In 1993, Russell Trethewey took on the post of Principal. By his retirement and replacement by Michael McMenamin in 2004, the school roll had reached over 1200. At the end of 2008, McMenamin returned to New Plymouth Boys' High School after five years at Freyberg High School. He was replaced as Principal by long-serving Deputy Principal Peter Brooks.

In 2005, the school celebrated its 50th Jubilee and in 2015, celebrated its 60th Jubilee.

In October 2022, Brooks retired as Principal after more than a decade in the role. He was replaced by Whangaparaoa College deputy principal Graeme Williams.

In March 2024, the school attracted media attention after several students staged a haka (war dance) Ka Mate during a visit by Associate Education Minister David Seymour to protest against the Government's proposal to slash the free school lunch programme Ka Ora, Ka Ako and perceived anti-Māori policies. One student waving the National Māori flag also spat near the feet of Seymour. In response, Principal Graeme Williams condemned the students' behaviour as "totally unacceptable" and stated that those responsible would be subject to disciplinary procedures. Following a 7,000-strong petition supporting the students, Williams announced that no disciplinary action would be taken against the students involved in the protest. Instead, he confirmed the school would work with the local iwi (tribe) Ngāti Ruanui Tumu Whakaae, the Ministry of Education, board of trustees, its Māori department and students to develop restorative processes to address the incident.

== Enrolment ==
As of July 2026, Freyberg High School has roll of 952 students, of which 324 (34.0%) identify as Māori.

As of 2026, the school has an Equity Index of 488, placing it amongst schools whose students have above average socioeconomic barriers to achievement (roughly equivalent to decile 4 under the former socio-economic decile system).

== Arts ==
=== Dance ===
Freyberg High School regularly competes in the Dance NZmade interschool competition in both regional and national levels, winning the regional final in 2018 and again reaching the national finals in 2019.

=== Music ===
Freyberg High School is renowned for its musical groups, with many reaching regional and national finals in choral and orchestral competitions. Choral group Bella and the Fellas has won regional awards at the Manawatū-Whanganui Big Sing every year since 2017. Female barbershop choir Miss Demeanor has also had national acclaim, reaching the Barbershop Harmony National Finals in 2019.

== School structure ==
=== Class structure ===
Freyberg High School works along the vertical structure with whānau groups which includes Year 9 through to Year 13 along house lines. The teacher of the whānau group is in the same house as his or her students.

Prior to 2002, there were horizontally structured tutor groups in which there was only one year level per group. Likewise, these groups were based on houses, with all students being in the same house. Before 2001, there was a mixture of houses within one tutor group.

In 2016, coaching classes were introduced to support students for the whole five years they attend the school. Students are taught beneficial skills such as time management, planning goals, career paths and study advice. The classes are sorted into individual year levels with one 'coach' who monitors the students throughout their journey from Year 9 to Year 13. It is held almost every week and replaces the whānau group time slot on Wednesdays.

=== House system ===
For the purposes of school structure and intraschool competition, Freyberg High School is divided into four houses of roughly equal size. All students belong to one of the houses. Each house has a name relevant to the region and has reference to Te Rauparaha; the names are as follows:

House Names & their Colours
Kapiti	Named for Kapiti Island.
Manawatu	Named for the Manawatū River.
Ruahine	Named for the Ruahine Ranges.
Tararua	Named for the Tararua Ranges.

== Facilities of the School ==
Freyberg High School offers a range of facilities for its students.Freyberg High School

- Visual Art Academy
- Sports Academy
- Music Academy
- Dance Academy
- Drama Academy
- Musical Theatre Academy
- Russell Trethewey Performing Arts Centre
- Craig Centre – Special Education block
- Deaf Education Unit
- Teen Parents' Unit
- Rumaki – Māori Immersion Classes
- Covered Heated Swimming Pool (Freyberg Community Pool)

== Notable staff ==
Notable staff, past and present include:

- Fiona Farrell – Author
- Delia Hannah – Actress
- Peter Ingram – Central Districts cricketer
- Margaret Kouvelis – Former Mayor of Manawatu
- Moira Senior – Black Stick
- Tangi Utikere – Labour MP for Palmerston North (2020–)

== Notable alumni ==
=== Politics ===
- Jacqui Dean – former television and radio host, now National MP for Otago (2005–2008) and Waitaki (2008–)
- Darien Fenton – Labour List MP (2005–2014)
- Steve Maharey – former Labour MP for Palmerston North (1990–2008), Vice-Chancellor of Massey University, Palmerston North (2009–2017)

=== Sport ===
- Ken Grainger – Former All Black
- Vivien Haddon – Commonwealth Games silver and bronze medalist and NZ Olympic representative.
- Sylvia Potts – Olympic and Commonwealth Games 1500m Runner
- Mark Ranby – former All Black
- Selica Winiata – New Zealand Sevens and New Zealand Women's rugby player

=== Entertainment ===
- David D'Ath – singer The Skeptics
- Lyn McConchie – International Science Fiction and Fantasy author
- Benjamin "Benny" Tipene – The X Factor NZ 2013
