= Helen Worboys =

New Zealand politician

Helen Joyce Worboys is a New Zealand local-body politician. She was the sixth Mayor of Manawatu, serving from 2016 to 2025.

== Early life and career ==
Worboys has lived in the Feilding area since the age of 10. Before entering local government she was a farmer and manager of development agency Feilding Promotion. She still farms at Mount Biggs, where she currently resides.

== Mayoral career ==
In October 2016 Worboys was elected Mayor of Manawatu, defeating incumbent Margaret Kouvelis. She was re-elected in 2019.

In October 2022, Worboys was re-elected for a third term, winning 5,080 votes. As chair of "Communities 4 Local Democracy – He hapori mō te Manapori," she campaigned against the New Zealand Government's controversial Three Waters reform programme. She made the decision to not stand for re-election in 2025, and was succeeded by Michael Ford in October 2025.
