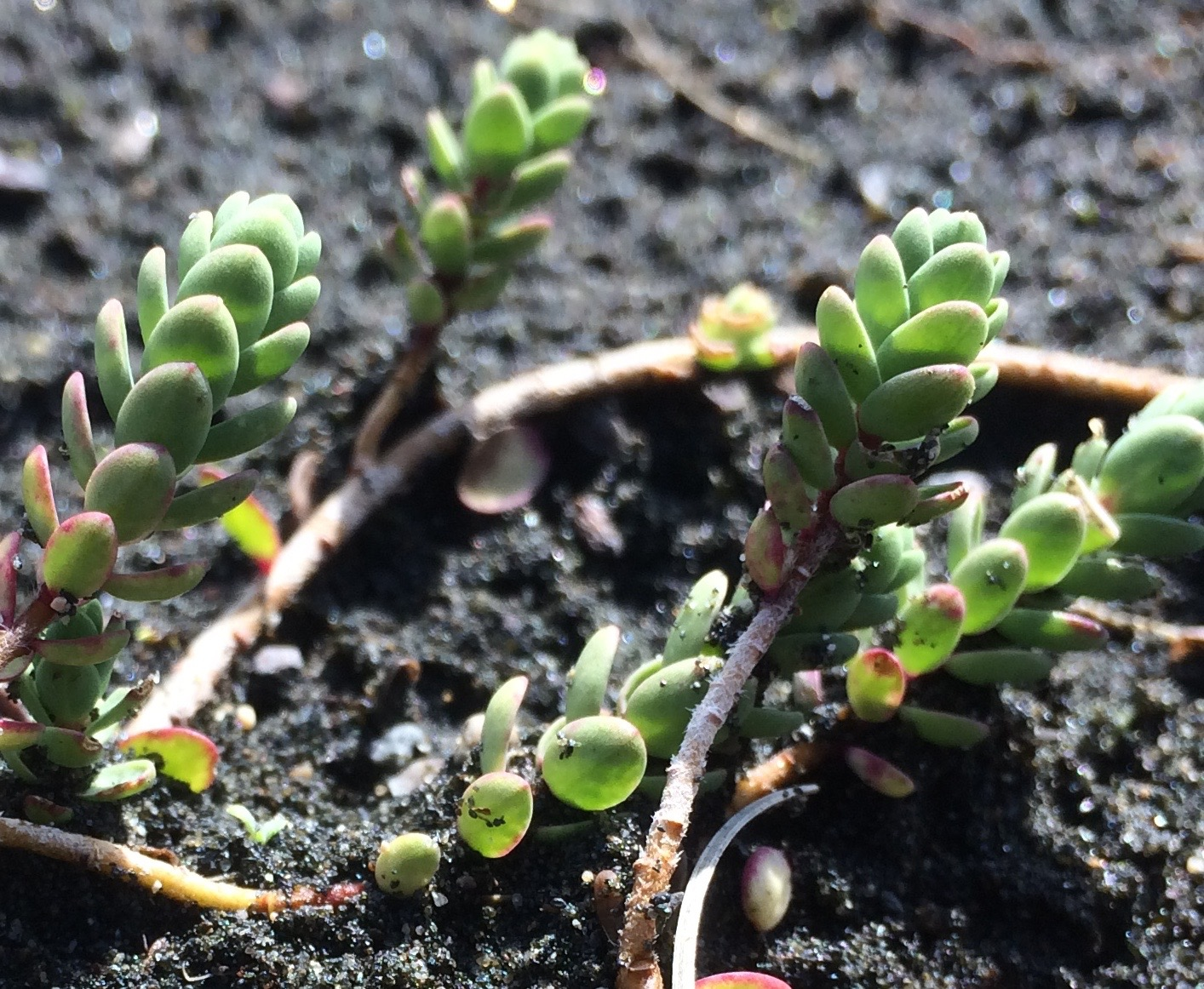

Conservation status
- Nationally Critical (NZ TCS)

Scientific classification
- Kingdom: Plantae
- Clade: Tracheophytes
- Clade: Angiosperms
- Clade: Eudicots
- Clade: Rosids
- Order: Malvales
- Family: Thymelaeaceae
- Genus: Pimelea
- Species: P. actea

Binomial name
- Pimelea actea C.J. Burrows 2008

Synonyms
- Pimelea "Turakina"

= Pimelea actea =

Species of flowering plant

Pimelea actea is a small coastal plant native to New Zealand. It was named and described by Colin J. Burrows in 2008 as part of a revision of the New Zealand Pimelea, a project he had begun as a Master's thesis in the 1950s and continued in his retirement. Burrows described the species, which for some time had been referred to as Pimelea "Turakina", from a specimen collected in 1968, now in the Auckland Museum. Its species name, actea, means "coastal".

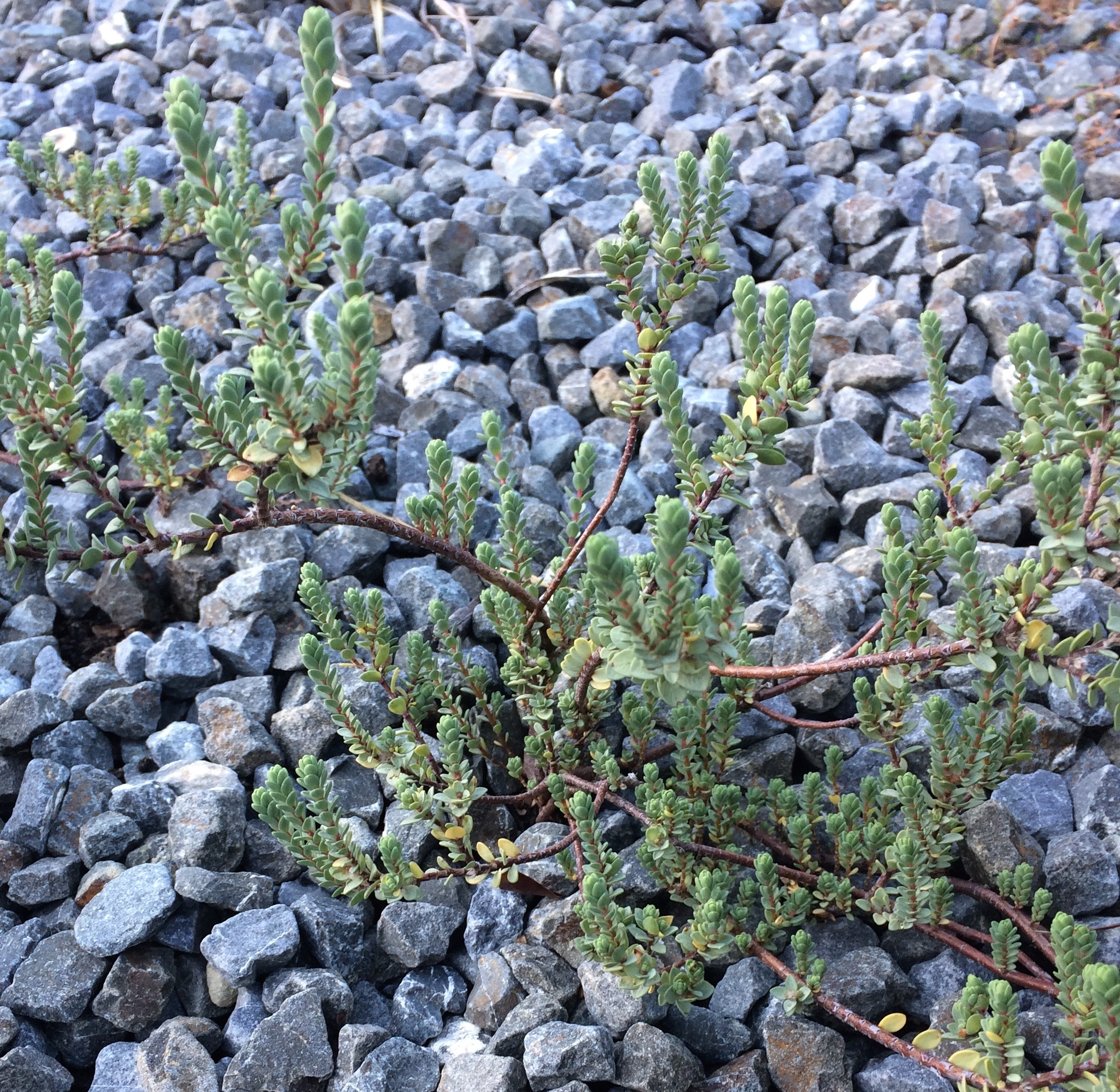
Pimelea actea in cultivation at Otari-Wilton's Bush, Wellington

P. actea was formerly widespread along the western North Island coastline, with specimens recorded from Foxton Beach and the mouth of the Turakina River, but is now restricted in the wild to only two localities: a single coastal paddock at Himatangi, and dunes at Tapuarau Reserve, Waitotara, near Whanganui. In Whanganui, the last remaining plant was being cultivated in potter Rick Rudd's Castlecliff garden; it has since been removed, propagated, and replanted at Tapuarau Reserve. Its natural habitat is dune slacks, temporary wetlands formed between sand dunes that are in danger of invasion by introduced grasses. Since 2004 P. actea has been classed as Nationally Critical by the Department of Conservation, and is one of New Zealand's most threatened plant species.
