= Colyton, New Zealand =

Colyton
- Locality
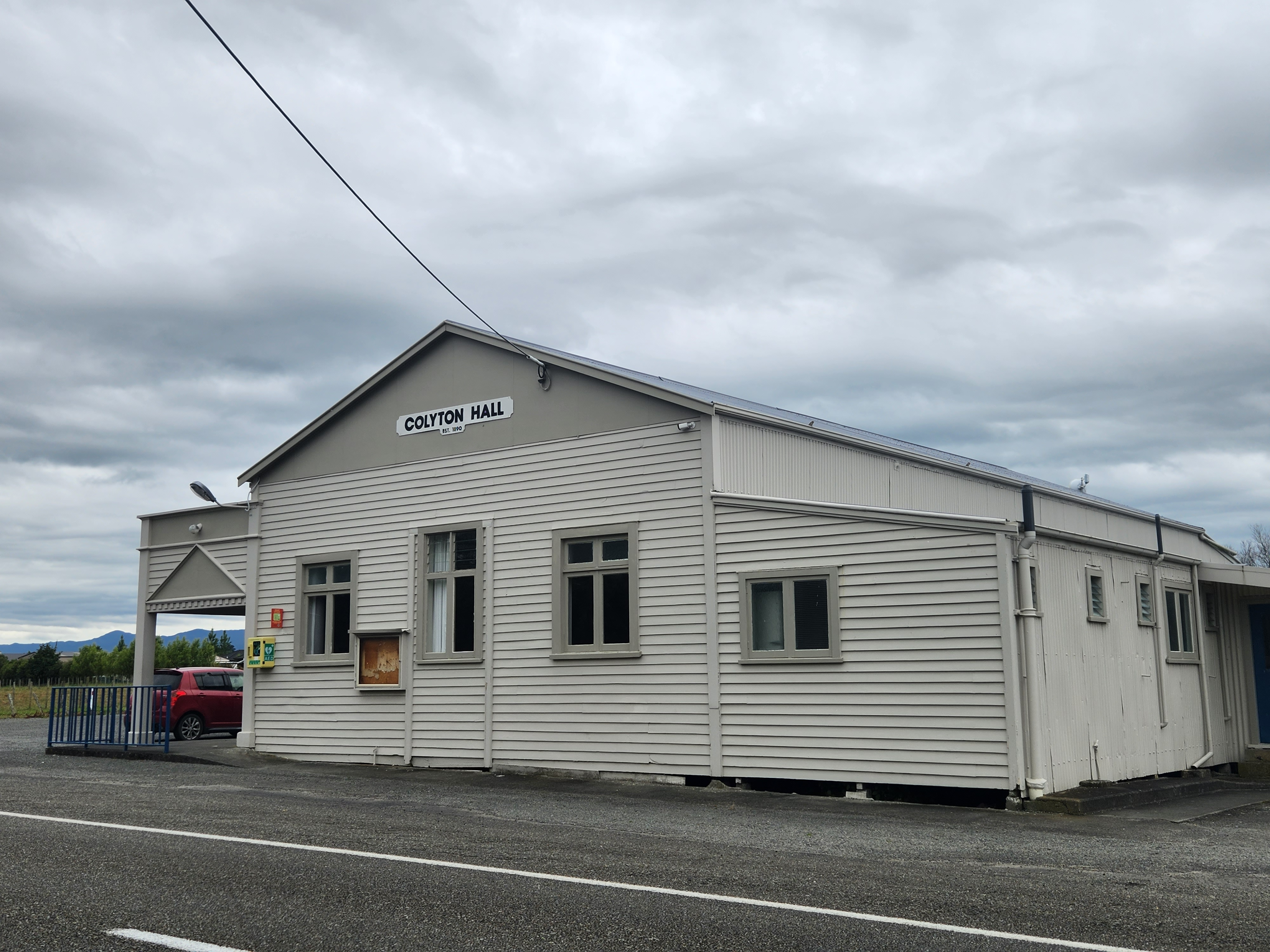
- Colyton Hall
- Nickname: Colon Town "Colyton Community Website". www.colyton.site.
- Interactive map of Colyton
- Coordinates: 40.226213°S 175.647036°E
- Country: New Zealand
- Region: Manawatū-Whanganui region
- Territorial authority: Manawatū District
- Ward: Manawatu Rural General Ward; Ngā Tapuae o Matangi Māori Ward
- Electorates: Rangitīkei; Te Tai Hauāuru (Māori)

Government
  - Territorial Authority: Manawatū District Council
  - Regional council: Horizons Regional Council
  - Mayor of Manawatu: Michael Ford
  - Rangitīkei MP: Suze Redmayne
  - Te Tai Hauāuru MP: Debbie Ngarewa-Packer

Area
  - Total: 14.80 km^{2} (5.71 sq mi)
- Elevation: 71 m (233 ft)

Population (2023 Census)
  - Total: 186
  - Density: 12.6/km^{2} (32.5/sq mi)
- Time zone: UTC+13
- Postal code: 4775

Colyton is a community in the Manawatū District and Manawatū-Whanganui region in New Zealand's central North Island.

Colyton has the postcode of 4775.

== Demographics ==
Colyton locality covers 14.80 km^{2} (5.71 sq mi). It is part of the larger Taonui statistical area.

Historical population
Year	Pop.	±% p.a.
2006	111	—
2013	150	+4.40%
2018	159	+1.17%
2023	186	+3.19%

Colyton had a population of 186 in the 2023 New Zealand census, an increase of 27 people (17.0%) since the 2018 census, and an increase of 36 people (24.0%) since the 2013 census. There were 90 males and 96 females in 66 dwellings. 1.6% of people identified as LGBTIQ+. The median age was 39.3 years (compared with 38.1 years nationally). There were 48 people (25.8%) aged under 15 years, 24 (12.9%) aged 15 to 29, 87 (46.8%) aged 30 to 64, and 27 (14.5%) aged 65 or older.

People could identify as more than one ethnicity. The results were 93.5% European (Pākehā), 9.7% Māori, 1.6% Asian, and 9.7% other, which includes people giving their ethnicity as "New Zealander". English was spoken by 98.4%, Māori by 3.2%, and other languages by 4.8%. No language could be spoken by 1.6% (e.g. too young to talk). New Zealand Sign Language was known by 4.8%. The percentage of people born overseas was 4.8, compared with 28.8% nationally.

The sole religious affiliation given was 21.0% Christian. People who answered that they had no religion were 74.2%, and 6.5% of people did not answer the census question.

Of those at least 15 years old, 33 (23.9%) people had a bachelor's or higher degree, 87 (63.0%) had a post-high school certificate or diploma, and 12 (8.7%) people exclusively held high school qualifications. The median income was $56,300, compared with $41,500 nationally. 24 people (17.4%) earned over $100,000 compared to 12.1% nationally. The employment status of those at least 15 was 84 (60.9%) full-time and 33 (23.9%) part-time.

== Education ==
Colyton School is a co-educational state primary school for Year 1 to 8 students, with a roll of 153 as of July 2026. It opened in 1884.

== History ==
Colyton Clocks: The largest collection of timepieces in the Southern Hemisphere from all over the world. The oldest piece is over 300 years old, and many others are over 100 years old.

Colyton is named after Colyton, Devon, from where many of the early settlers of the district came.

The Colyton Hall was built in 1890, and following a fire in 1995, it was rebuilt. Because of the rebuild, the hall has many modern amenities. The Hall has a news board outside to show local events.
