= List of shipwrecks in July 1939 =

The list of shipwrecks in July 1939 includes ships sunk, foundered, grounded, or otherwise lost during July 1939.

== 2 July ==
List of shipwrecks: 2 July 1939
| Ship | State | Description |
|---|---|---|
| Notraco | Finland | The cargo ship ran aground at Östergarn, Sweden. Refloated on 4 July. |

== 4 July ==
List of shipwrecks: 4 July 1939
| Ship | State | Description |
|---|---|---|
| Louise Moller | United Kingdom | The cargo ship became stranded on Mamay Island (34°12′N 125°19′E). She was refloated the next day. |

== 5 July ==
List of shipwrecks: 5 July 1939
| Ship | State | Description |
|---|---|---|
| Rim | Panama | The passenger ship caught fire west of Symi, Greece and was wrecked. |

== 6 July ==
List of shipwrecks: 6 July 1939
| Ship | State | Description |
|---|---|---|
| Houston City | United Kingdom | The cargo ship ran aground on Quelpart Island, Korea. She was later refloated and sailed to Shanghai, China for repairs. The damage was described as "considerable". |
| Pamia | Italy | The cargo ship ran aground 4 nautical miles (7.4 km) east of Cape Sidi Freuch, Algeria. She was refloated on 8 July. |

== 8 July ==
List of shipwrecks: 8 July 1939
| Ship | State | Description |
|---|---|---|
| Patria | Germany | The cargo ship ran aground in Risøysund, near Måløy, Norway. Refloated on 12 July. |

== 9 July ==
List of shipwrecks: 9 July 1939
| Ship | State | Description |
|---|---|---|
| Capira | United Kingdom | The cargo ship caught fire and came ashore at Parrita, Costa Rica. She was declared a total loss. |
| Nobless | Sweden | The sailing ship caught fire and sank at Bunsbuttelkoog, Germany. |

== 10 July ==
List of shipwrecks: 10 July 1939
| Ship | State | Description |
|---|---|---|
| Marina | United Kingdom | The cargo ship ran aground in the Martín García Channel, Argentina. |

== 11 July ==
List of shipwrecks: 11 July 1939
| Ship | State | Description |
|---|---|---|
| Fram | Netherlands | The cargo ship ran aground off Rhyl Pier, Rhyl, Denbighshire, United Kingdom. She was refloated the next day. |
| Keyholt | United Kingdom | The cargo ship ran aground at Morrisburg, Ontario, Canada. She was refloated on 13 July. |
| HMS Tarantula | Royal Navy | The Insect-class gunboat ran aground in the Canton River, China. She was later refloated by a British destroyer. |

== 12 July ==
List of shipwrecks: 12 July 1939
| Ship | State | Description |
|---|---|---|
| Taian Maru No.2 | Japan | The cargo ship ran aground of Saddle Island, Torres Strait, Australia. |

== 14 July ==
List of shipwrecks: 14 July 1939
| Ship | State | Description |
|---|---|---|
| Ullapool | United Kingdom | The cargo ship ran aground in the Martín García Channel, Argentina. She was refloated on 17 July. 7 |

== 15 July ==
List of shipwrecks: 15 July 1939
| Ship | State | Description |
|---|---|---|
| Lornaston | United Kingdom | The cargo ship ran aground in the Martín García Channel, Argentina. She was refloated on 17 July. |

== 18 July ==
List of shipwrecks: 18 July 1939
| Ship | State | Description |
|---|---|---|
| Bokuyo Maru | Japan | The cargo liner caught fire and sank in the Pacific Ocean with the loss of two of her crew. The rest of the crew and all passengers on board were rescued by an American tanker. |
| Port Bowen | United Kingdom | The refrigerated cargo ship ran aground off Wanganui, North Island, New Zealand. She was declared a total loss and scrapped in situ. |

== 19 July ==
List of shipwrecks: 19 July 1939
| Ship | State | Description |
|---|---|---|
| Acropolis | Greece | The passenger ship ran aground at Burj, 8 nautical miles (15 km) south of Chalkis. She was refloated on 25 July. |
| Louisiana | United States | The fishing vessel was wrecked in fog on a reef at the head of Pavlof Bay on the south coast of the Alaska Peninsula, Territory of Alaska Her crew of five survived. |

== 21 July ==
List of shipwrecks: 21 July 1939
| Ship | State | Description |
|---|---|---|
| Edgar F. Luckenbach | United States | The cargo ship collided with the wharf at New Orleans, Louisiana and was severely damaged. She was beached to prevent her sinking. She later sank. |

== 22 July ==
List of shipwrecks: 22 July 1939
| Ship | State | Description |
|---|---|---|
| Nika Nah | United States | The motor boat was destroyed by an explosion and fire while testing her gasoline engines 0.25 nautical miles (0.46 km; 0.29 mi) off San Juan Dock at Seward, Territory of Alaska. All four people on board survived. |
| HMAS Stalwart | Royal Australian Navy | The S-class destroyer was scuttled in the Tasman Sea (34°59′54″S 151°36′4″E). |

== 24 July ==
List of shipwrecks: 24 July 1939
| Ship | State | Description |
|---|---|---|
| Imberie | Brazil | The dredger foundered in the Atlantic Ocean (15°42′S 38°52′W). |

== 25 July ==
List of shipwrecks: 25 July 1939
| Ship | State | Description |
|---|---|---|
| Mount Rhodope | Greece | The cargo ship ran aground in the Pará River, Brazil. She was refloated on 29 July. |

== 27 July ==
List of shipwrecks: 27 July 1939
| Ship | State | Description |
|---|---|---|
| Grangesberg, and Sunik | Sweden; France | The tanker Sunic collided with the cargo ship Grangesberg in dense fog 30 nautical miles (56 km) south of the Eddystone Lighthouse, Cornwall, United Kingdom (49°55′N 4°30′W). Both ships caught fire. Sunic was abandoned with the loss of ten of her 34 crew. Survivors were rescued by Grangesberg. They were later transferred to Dartford (United Kingdom) and landed at Falmouth, Cornwall. Sunik later capsized and sank. Grangesberg put into Falmouth, on fire and severely damaged. Her captain was lost overboard as a result of the collision. |

== 31 July ==
List of shipwrecks: 31 July 1939
| Ship | State | Description |
|---|---|---|
| Lang | United States | The motor boat was wrecked at Passage Point (57°51′N 134°56′W) in Chatham Strait outside of Freshwater Bay in the Alexander Archipelago, Territory of Alaska due to a navigational error. The vessel Nira (United States) rescued the only person aboard. |
| Syoan Maru | Japan | The cargo ship ran aground at Aimirisaki, Sakhalin, Soviet Union. She was refloated on 4 August. |
