= Godfrey Hirst Carpets =

Australian carpet company

- Type: Private company
- Founded: 1888
- Headquarters: Geelong & Melbourne, Australia
- Products: Godfrey Hirst; Feltex; Hycraft
- Number of employees: 500 Australia; 180 New Zealand (October 2022)
- Website: Godfrey Hirst website

Godfrey Hirst Carpets is the largest manufacturer and exporter of residential and commercial carpets in Australasia.

The business was founded in 1888 in Geelong, Victoria, Australia, by Godfrey Hirst, an English immigrant from Meltham, West Yorkshire, England. His Excelsior Mill, on the north bank of the Barwon River, manufactured various wool textiles until it was sold in the 1966, continuing in operation as Godfrey Hirst Carpets. Godfrey Hirst acquired Feltex Carpets of New Zealand as an ongoing concern in 2006.

Godfrey Hirst Carpets has production plants in Victoria, Australia and New Zealand. It also has offices in the United States and Singapore, and exports throughout Southeast Asia, Japan, USA, the Middle East and other world markets.

The company produces several brands of carpet products for residential and commercial markets. It has also expanded into hard flooring, including timber, laminate and other surfaces.

In early 2017, it was reported that the investment bank, Greenhill, was seeking a buyer for the company, which was majority owned by the McKendrick family. The business had $427.8 million annual revenue and earnings worth $55.9 million.

On 20 November 2017, Mohawk Industries, Inc., announced they had "agreed to acquire Godfrey Hirst Group". The transaction was expected to be "completed during the first half of 2018".
