= Sanson Tramway =

Coordinates: 40.391°S 175.3166°E

The Sanson Tramway in the Manawatū region of New Zealand operated from 1885 until 1945. Owned by the Manawatu County Council, it connected with the national railway network at Himatangi on the Foxton Branch. It was never part of the national network.

== Construction ==
After the construction of a tramway (later upgraded to a railway) linking Foxton and Palmerston North, settlers north of Foxton began efforts to have a rail link built from to their settlements so they could easily access the port. In 1878 the Foxton and Sanson Railway Company was formed in order to build a line northwards from Himatangi (then named Carnarvon) to Sanson, and it envisaged that the line would become part of a trunk route from Wellington to the north. Before construction began legislation was passed that made it appealing for the Manawatu County Council to build the line as a tramway and thereby qualify for subsidies. Work started from the Foxton line at Himatangi in 1882, and the line opened to Rongotea Siding on 23 August 1884, followed by Sanson, south-west of Feilding, on 16 November 1885. In 1902, a short extension beyond Sanson was opened to the southern bank of the Rangitikei River, opposite Bulls.

== Operation ==
The Sanson Tramway was initially operated by the steam tram Hibernia from Wellington. It was not an adequate source of motive power, and a former Foxton locomotive from the days when the Foxton Branch was a tramway commenced work on the line by the time it was opened to Sanson. As traffic became more substantial, old locomotives were acquired from New Zealand Railways to run on the tramway. As these locomotives were very light, they were just at home on a rural tramway as they had been on the nation's expanding network of railway lines before being displaced by more powerful and substantial engines.

When Foxton locomotive depot closed and passenger services on the Foxton Branch were withdrawn in 1932, running to Foxton from the tramway ceased. The line received a boost just before World War II when it was required to service contractors at the Ohakea RNZAF Base, and during the war petrol restrictions helped to generate traffic. These restrictions ended with the coming of peace and post-war traffic on the line was too insignificant to justify its continued existence. It closed on 29 November 1945.

== Locomotives used on the line ==
- "Hibernia" Built 1877, by Merryweather & Sons, Clapham, UK. In use 1882 to 1886.
- "Wallaby" Built 1875, by E.W Mills, Wellington, NZ (NZR, ex Foxton Tramway). In use 1885 to 1889.
- "Weka" Built 1876, by James Davidson, Dunedin, NZ (ex NZR P58, WMR). In use 1898 to 1922.
- "Fox" Built 1873, by Dubs and Co, Glasgow, Scotland (ex NZR A192). In use 1889 to 1910.
- G56 Built 1874, by Black Hawthorn, Gateshead-on-Tyne, UK (ex NZR). In use 1918 to 1944.
- R211 Built 1879, by Avonside Engine Company, Bristol, UK. Single Fairlie type. (ex NZR) In use 1926 to 1933.
- R29 Built 1879, by Avonside Engine Company, Bristol, UK. Single Fairlie type. (ex NZR) In use 1944 to 1946.
