= Himatangi =

Settlement in Manawatū-Whanganui Region, New Zealand

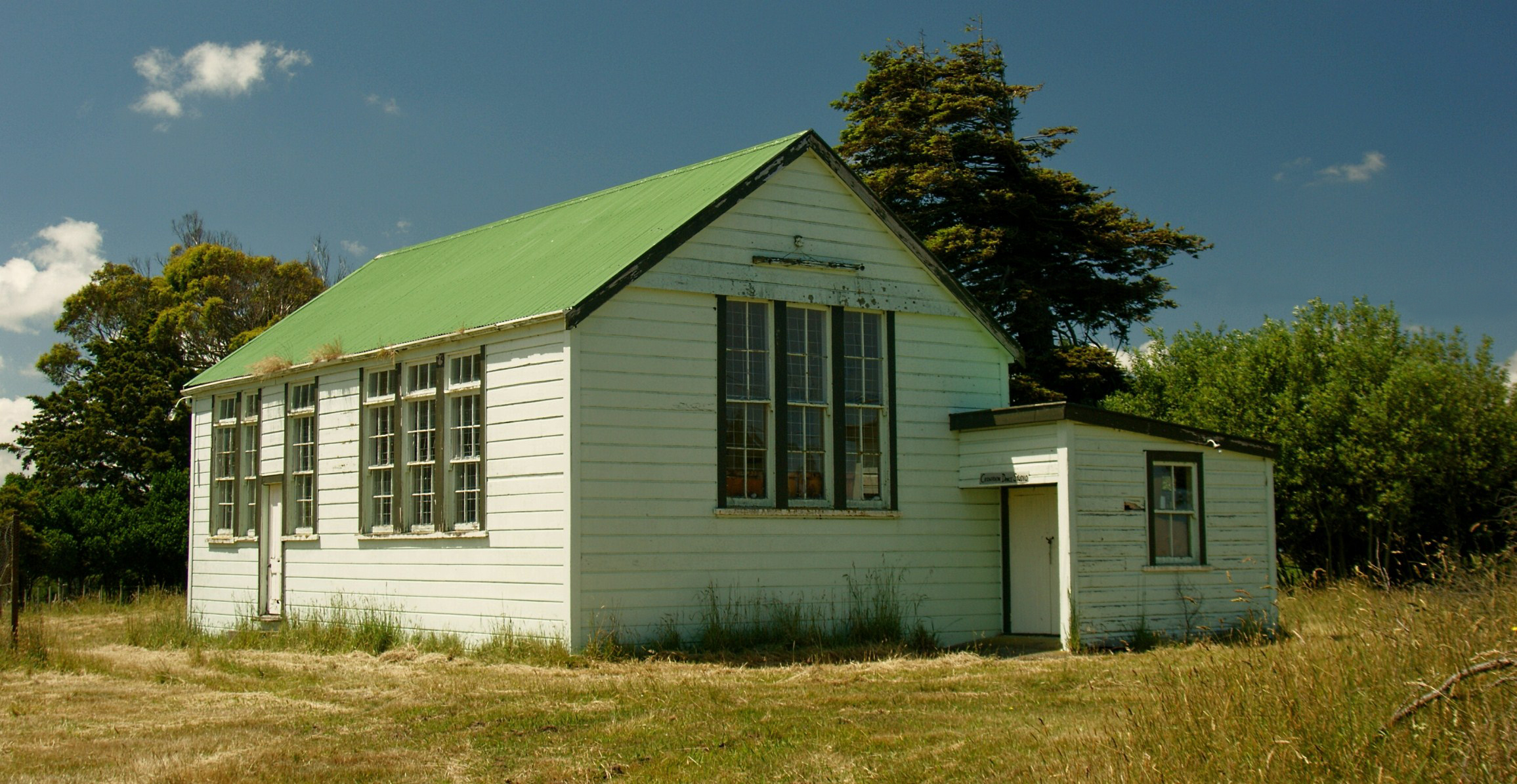
- Carnarvon Hall, north of Himatangi, now demolished
- Interactive map of Himatangi
- Coordinates: 40°24′S 175°19′E
- Country: New Zealand
- Region: Manawatū-Whanganui
- District: Manawatū District
- Ward: Manawatū Rural General Ward; Ngā Tapuae o Matangi Māori Ward
- Electorates: Rangitīkei; Te Tai Hauāuru (Māori)

Government
  - Territorial Authority: Manawatū District Council
  - Regional council: Horizons Regional Council
  - Mayor of Manawatu: Michael Ford
  - Rangitīkei MP: Suze Redmayne
  - Te Tai Hauāuru MP: Debbie Ngarewa-Packer

Area
  - Total: 41.51 km^{2} (16.03 sq mi)

Population (2023 Census)
  - Total: 222
  - Density: 5.35/km^{2} (13.9/sq mi)

Himatangi is a small settlement in the Manawatū District of New Zealand's North Island. It is located at the junction of State Highways 1 and 56, 25 kilometres west of Palmerston North, and seven kilometres east of the coastal settlement of Himatangi Beach.

The area has two marae:

- Motuiti Marae and its Rakau or Paewai meeting house is affiliated with the Rangitāne hapū of Ngāti Mairehau and the Ngāti Raukawa hapū of Ngāti Rākau.
- Paranui Marae and its Turanga meeting house is affiliated with the Ngāti Raukawa hapū of Ngāti Te Au and Ngāti Tūranga.

About 50 Māori land blocks are located between Himatangi and Foxton to the south.

== History ==
The area was largely undeveloped with rough terrain in 1942, according to a photograph held in the National Library of New Zealand.

Himatangi was once the location of the junction between the New Zealand Railways Department's Foxton Branch railway and the Manawatu County Council's Sanson Tramway. Both lines are now closed; use of the Tramway ceased in 1945, followed by the Branch in 1959.

In 2005, a study found agricultural pesticides were being rapidly leached into the sandy soil at Himatangi.

In 2009, planning approval was granted for the building of a piggery after the landowner agreed to reduce from what he originally proposed. The landowner and New Zealand Pork Board had been considering legal action through the Environment Court.

In 2014, the community was used as a trial community for the Horizons Regional Council's emergency readiness plan.

In 2019 a regional bus service between Levin and Palmerston North was introduced, providing a weekly return service between Himatangi and Foxton.

== Demographics ==
Himatangi locality covers 41.51 km^{2} (16.03 sq mi). It is part of the larger Oroua Downs statistical area.

Historical population for Himatangi locality
Year	Pop.	±% p.a.
2006	219	—
2013	186	−2.31%
2018	228	+4.16%
2023	222	−0.53%

Himatangi had a population of 222 in the 2023 New Zealand census, a decrease of 6 people (−2.6%) since the 2018 census, and an increase of 36 people (19.4%) since the 2013 census. There were 117 males and 105 females in 81 dwellings. 2.7% of people identified as LGBTIQ+. There were 57 people (25.7%) aged under 15 years, 30 (13.5%) aged 15 to 29, 117 (52.7%) aged 30 to 64, and 18 (8.1%) aged 65 or older.

People could identify as more than one ethnicity. The results were 82.4% European (Pākehā), 14.9% Māori, 1.4% Pasifika, and 8.1% Asian. English was spoken by 97.3%, Māori by 2.7%, and other languages by 6.8%. No language could be spoken by 1.4% (e.g. too young to talk). New Zealand Sign Language was known by 1.4%. The percentage of people born overseas was 17.6, compared with 28.8% nationally.

Religious affiliations were 20.3% Christian, and 1.4% New Age. People who answered that they had no religion were 64.9%, and 10.8% of people did not answer the census question.

Of those at least 15 years old, 21 (12.7%) people had a bachelor's or higher degree, 96 (58.2%) had a post-high school certificate or diploma, and 45 (27.3%) people exclusively held high school qualifications. 15 people (9.1%) earned over $100,000 compared to 12.1% nationally. The employment status of those at least 15 was 96 (58.2%) full-time, 24 (14.5%) part-time, and 3 (1.8%) unemployed.

=== Oroua Downs statistical area ===
Oroua Downs statistical area, which also includes Himatangi Beach and Tangimoana, covers 124.62 km^{2} (48.12 sq mi) and had an estimated population of 1,480 as of June 2025, with a population density of 12 people per km^{2}.

Historical population for Oroua Downs
Year	Pop.	±% p.a.
2006	1,167	—
2013	1,044	−1.58%
2018	1,254	+3.73%
2023	1,371	+1.80%

Oroua Downs had a population of 1,371 in the 2023 New Zealand census, an increase of 117 people (9.3%) since the 2018 census, and an increase of 327 people (31.3%) since the 2013 census. There were 702 males, 657 females, and 9 people of other genders in 582 dwellings. 3.3% of people identified as LGBTIQ+. The median age was 48.8 years (compared with 38.1 years nationally). There were 213 people (15.5%) aged under 15 years, 189 (13.8%) aged 15 to 29, 711 (51.9%) aged 30 to 64, and 258 (18.8%) aged 65 or older.

People could identify as more than one ethnicity. The results were 86.9% European (Pākehā), 17.7% Māori, 3.3% Pasifika, 3.5% Asian, and 4.4% other, which includes people giving their ethnicity as "New Zealander". English was spoken by 98.2%, Māori by 3.5%, Samoan by 0.9%, and other languages by 4.8%. No language could be spoken by 1.5% (e.g. too young to talk). New Zealand Sign Language was known by 0.7%. The percentage of people born overseas was 12.9, compared with 28.8% nationally.

Religious affiliations were 23.9% Christian, 0.4% Hindu, 0.7% Māori religious beliefs, 0.4% Buddhist, 0.9% New Age, and 1.3% other religions. People who answered that they had no religion were 62.6%, and 10.3% of people did not answer the census question.

Of those at least 15 years old, 150 (13.0%) people had a bachelor's or higher degree, 666 (57.5%) had a post-high school certificate or diploma, and 342 (29.5%) people exclusively held high school qualifications. The median income was $40,600, compared with $41,500 nationally. 93 people (8.0%) earned over $100,000 compared to 12.1% nationally. The employment status of those at least 15 was 612 (52.8%) full-time, 150 (13.0%) part-time, and 18 (1.6%) unemployed.

== Education ==
Oroua Downs School is a co-educational state primary school for Year 1 to 8 students, with a roll of 87 as of July 2026. It opened in 1903.
