= Mayor of Manawatu =

Mayor of the Manawatū District Of New Zealand

- Incumbent; Michael Ford since 2025
- Style: His/Her Worship
- Term length: Three years, renewable
- Formation: 1989
- Salary: $132,068
- Website: Official website

The mayor of Manawatu officiates over the Manawatū District Council in New Zealand.

Michael Ford is the current mayor of Manawatu. He was elected in 2025.

== History ==
The Manawatū District was formed through the amalgamation of the former Feilding Borough, Kiwitea County, Manawatu District, Oroua County and Pohangina County Councils in the 1989 local government reforms. The first mayor was Caryll Clausen, who had previously been on the Feilding Borough Council. Clausen was re-elected in the 1992 local elections and retired for the 1995 elections. In the 1995 Birthday Honours, she was awarded an MBE for services to local body and community affairs. (Clausen died on 19 March 2024.)

Rob Moodie, a former policeman, lawyer, and goat farmer, succeeded Clausen in the 1995 local elections; he narrowly beat Audrey Severinsen, who became deputy mayor. Moodie served for one term and was defeated by Severinsen in the 1998 local elections. Severinsen resigned in 2002 due to ill health and died in February 2003.

Ian McKelvie succeeded Severinsen in a by-election in November 2002. After being elected to Parliament in the 2011 election, he resigned from the mayoralty on 15 December 2011. Deputy Mayor Matt Bell was then acting mayor until a by-election held on 7 March 2012. The by-election was narrowly won by Margaret Kouvelis from Feilding, who beat councillor Steven Gibson by just 14 votes (3293 votes to 3279). Worboys won the 2016 election. She was re-elected in 2019. Michael Ford was elected unopposed in 2025.

== List of mayors ==
The following list shows the seven mayors of Manawatu:

	Name	Portrait	Term
1	Caryll Clausen		1989–1995
2	Rob Moodie		1995–1998
3	Audrey Severinsen		1998–2002
–	Mervyn J. Craw (acting)		2002
4	Ian McKelvie		2002–2011
–	Matt J. Bell (acting)		2011–2012
5	Margaret Kouvelis		2012–2016
6	Helen Worboys		2016–2025
7	Michael Ford		2025–present

== List of deputy mayors ==
Name	Term	Mayor
Audrey Severinsen	1995–1998	Moodie
Unknown	1998–2002	Severinsen
Unknown	1998–2002	Craw (acting)
Melvyn Craw	2002–2005	McKelvie
John Gregory	2005–c. 2007	McKelvie
Matt Bell	c. 2008–2011	McKelvie
Position vacant (December 2011–March 2012) (Note: The deputy mayor, Matt Bell, became acting mayor upon mayor Ian McKelvie's resignation as mayor, leaving the deputy mayor office vacant.)		Bell (acting)
Matt Bell	2012–2013	Kouvelis
Tony Jensen	2013–2016	Kouvelis
Michael Ford	2016–2025	Worboys
Grant Hadfield	2025–present	Ford

== See also ==
- Mayor of Palmerston North
- Mayor of Rangitikei
