= List of festivals in Oceania =

Festivals of Oceania
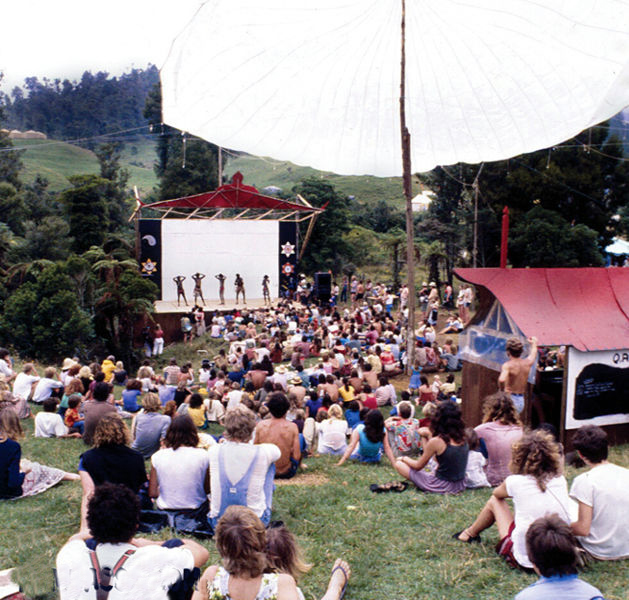
- 1981 Nambassa Festival, Waikato, New Zealand

General Information
- Subtopics: List of festivals, list of music festivals, list of film festivals
- Location: Oceania
- Related topics: Culture of Oceania

The following is an incomplete list of festivals in Oceania, with links to separate lists by country and region where applicable. This list includes festivals of diverse types, including regional festivals, commerce festivals, film festivals, folk festivals, carnivals, pow wows, recurring festivals on holidays, and music festivals. Music festivals are annotated "(music)" for countries where there is not a dedicated music section.

The list overlaps with List of film festivals in Oceania.

== Sovereign states ==
=== Australia ===
- List of festivals in Australia
- List of music festivals in Australia

=== Fiji ===
- List of festivals in Fiji

=== Kiribati ===
- Public holidays in Kiribati

=== The Marshall Islands ===
- Public holidays in the Marshall Islands

=== Federated States of Micronesia ===
- Public holidays in the Federated States of Micronesia
- Yap Day
- Homecoming Summer Festival
- Canoe Festival

=== Nauru ===
- Public holidays in Nauru

=== New Zealand ===
- Alexandra Blossom Festival
- Alpine Unity
- Armageddon (convention)
- Auckland Easter Show
- Balloons over Waikato
- Bluff Oyster Festival
- Christmas in the Park (New Zealand)
- Couch Soup (theatre)
- Cuba Street Carnival
- Dunedin Chocolate Festival
- Dunedin Midwinter Carnival
- Ellerslie Flower Show
- Erotica Expo
- Festival of Lights (New Plymouth)
- Frocktober
- Grey Lynn
- Hero Parade
- Hokitika Wildfoods Festival
- iD Dunedin Fashion Week
- International Exhibition (1906)
- KapCon
- Kiwiburn
- New Zealand International Science Festival
- New Zealand National Science Fiction Convention
- Out In The Square
- Pasifika Festival
- Sesqui 1990
- Sportavex
- Tarara Day
- Te Hui Ahurei a Tuhoe
- Te Matatini
- Vinegar Hill, New Zealand
- Waikino Music Festival
- Warbirds Over Wanaka
- Whangamata Beach Hop

==== Arts festivals in New Zealand ====
- Artsplash Festival
- Auckland Festival
- Dunedin Arts Festival
- Dunedin Fringe Festival
- InterACT Disability Arts Festival
- New Zealand Fringe Festival
- Oamaru Steampunk Festival
- Pasifika Festival
- Wellington Arts Festival
- World Buskers Festival
- World of Wearable Art

==== Music festivals in New Zealand ====
- New Zealand music festivals

==== Film festivals in New Zealand ====
- 48Hours
- Big Mountain Short Film Festival
- Documentary Edge Festival
- Hamilton Underground Film Festival
- Handle the Jandal
- New Zealand International Film Festivals
- Out Takes: A Reel Queer Film Festival
- Reel Earth Environmental Film Festival
- Show Me Shorts
- Wairoa Māori Film Festival

=== Palau ===
- Festival of Pacific Arts
- Public holidays in Palau

=== Papua New Guinea ===
- Malagan
- Goroka Show (music)
- Sing-sing (New Guinea) (music)

=== Samoa ===
- Festival of Pacific Arts
- Public holidays in Samoa

=== Solomon Islands ===
- Festival of Pacific Arts
- Public holidays in the Solomon Islands

=== Tonga ===
- List of festivals in Tonga

=== Tuvalu ===
- Public holidays in Tuvalu

=== Vanuatu ===
- Public holidays in Vanuatu

== Associated states of New Zealand ==
=== Cook Islands ===
- Festival of Pacific Arts
- Public holidays in the Cook Islands

== Dependencies and other territories ==
=== American Samoa ===
- Festival of Pacific Arts

=== Christmas Island ===
- Public holidays in Christmas Island

=== French Polynesia ===
- Festival of Pacific Arts
- FIFO (Festival International du Film Documentaire Océanien) in Tahiti

=== Guam ===
- Festival of Pacific Arts
- Public holidays in Guam

=== Hawaii ===
- Aloha Festivals
- Festival of Lights (Hawaii)
- First Hawaiian International Auto Show
- Iolani Luahine Hula Festival
- Kawaii Kon
- Lei Day
- Merrie Monarch Festival
- Spam Jam
- World Invitational Hula Festival
- Molokai Ka Hula Piko
- Honolulu Rainbow Film Festival (film)
- Maui Film Festival (film)
- Hawaii International Film Festival (film)

Music festivals in Hawaii

- List of music festivals and venues in Hawaii
- Annual Ukulele Festival

=== New Caledonia ===
- Festival of Pacific Arts

=== Norfolk Island ===
- Public holidays in Norfolk Island

=== Tokelau ===
- Public holidays in Tokelau

== See also ==
- List of festivals
- List of film festivals
- List of music festivals
