= State Highway 54 (New Zealand) =

Road route in New Zealand

State Highway 54

Route information
- Maintained by NZ Transport Agency Waka Kotahi
- Length: 56.5 km (35.1 mi)

Major junctions
- North end: SH 1 at Vinegar Hill
- South end: SH 3 (Rangitikei Line) near Palmerston North

Location
- Country: New Zealand
- Towns: Feilding, Cheltenham

Highway system
- New Zealand state highways; Motorways and expressways; List
| ← SH 53 | → SH 56 |

State Highway 54 (SH 54) is a New Zealand state highway that runs across nearly all of the Manawatū District in the North Island. It runs from SH 1 at Vinegar Hill (near Hunterville) to SH 3 near Palmerston North. The highway connects the Manawatū District's chief town, Feilding, to the New Zealand state highway network and forms an alternative route to SH 1 and SH 3 between the North Island Volcanic Plateau and Palmerston North.

== Route ==
SH 54 begins at a junction with SH 1 near the locality of Vinegar Hill, 6 km (3.7 mi) east-north-east of Hunterville. It steeply descends to cross the Rangitīkei River before proceeding generally southwards, winding along the eastern side of the Rangitīkei Valley. The route then exits the valley and heads via Rewa, Waituna West, and Beaconsfield villages to Cheltenham, where it meets Kimbolton Road at a three-way junction shortly after crossing the Kiwitea Stream.

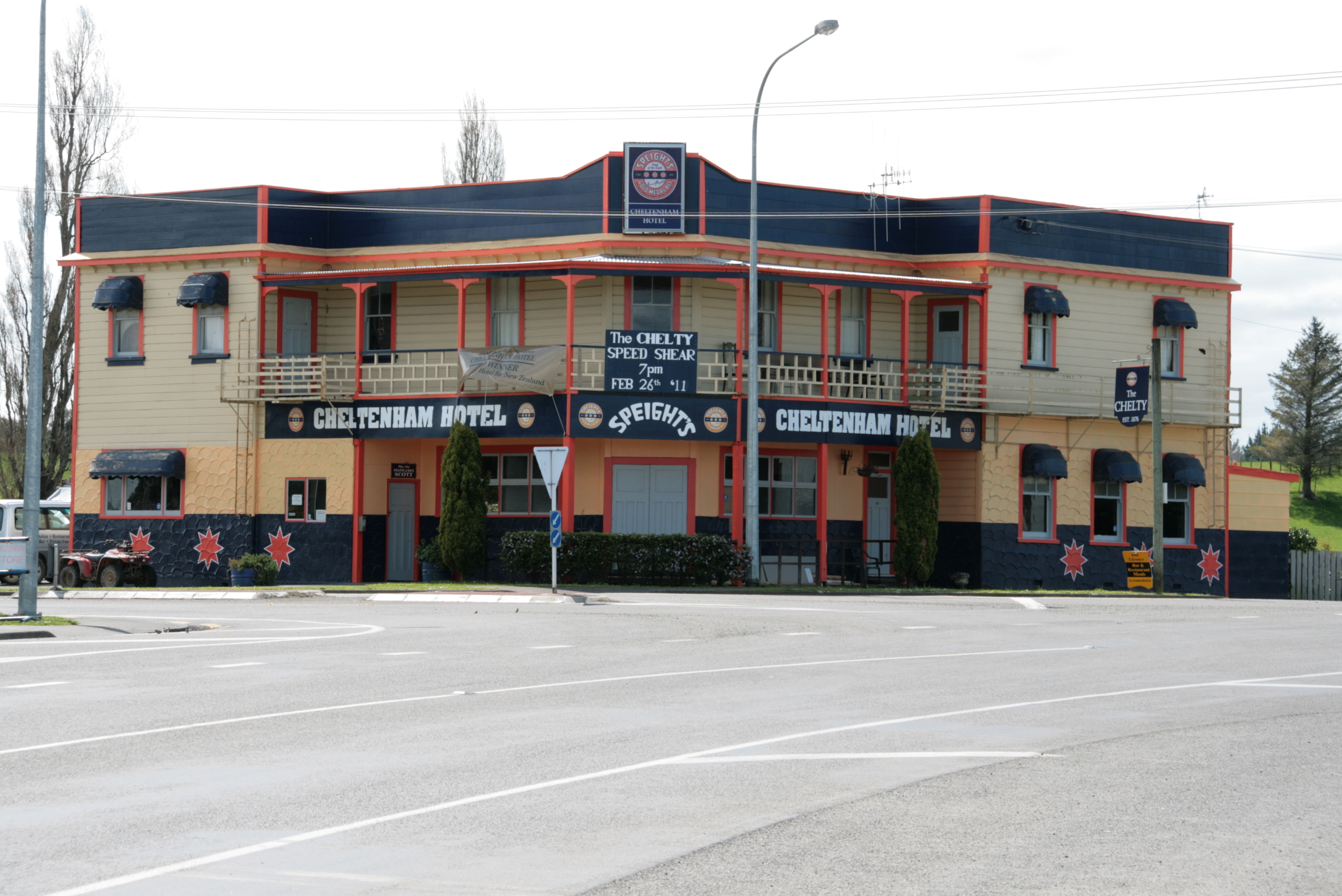
View of Cheltenham hotel on the approach from the south-west before the highway turns to the left

From Cheltenham, the route turns south-west onto Kimbolton Road, reaching Feilding shortly after again crossing the Kiwitea Stream; it crosses the North Island Main Trunk railway then turns left at a roundabout in the central business district and parallels the railway line for a short distance along Aorangi Street and Waughs Road (crossing the Oroua River). It then leaves Waughs Road and travels south-west along Camerons Line and south-east along Milson Line, before turning south-west along Kairanga-Bunnythorpe Road. The SH 54 designation ends at the junction of Kairanga-Bunnythorpe Road with SH 3 near the settlement of Newbury, 4.5 km (2.8 mi) north-west of central Palmerston North.

=== Route changes ===
SH 54 previously began further north at Mangaweka, leaving SH 1 on Ruahine Road and travelling via Rangiwahia to Kimbolton, where it travelled along Kimbolton Road to Cheltenham before continuing along its current route to Feilding and beyond. The north end of SH 54 was shifted to the Cheltenham-Hunterville Road (its current route between SH 1 and Cheltenham) in the 1990s.

== See also ==
- List of New Zealand state highways
