= Newbury, New Zealand =

Rural settlement in Manawatū-Whanganui Region, New Zealand

Newbury
- Locality
- Interactive map of Newbury
- Coordinates: 40.315655°S 175.570795°E
- Country: New Zealand
- Region: Manawatū-Whanganui region
- Territorial authority: Manawatū District
- Ward: Manawatū Rural General Ward; Ngā Tapuae o Matangi Māori Ward
- Electorates: Rangitīkei; Te Tai Hauāuru (Māori)

Government
  - Territorial Authority: Manawatū District Council
  - Regional council: Horizons Regional Council
  - Mayor of Manawatu: Michael Ford
  - Rangitīkei MP: Suze Redmayne
  - Te Tai Hauāuru MP: Debbie Ngarewa-Packer

Area
  - Total: 12.78 km^{2} (4.93 sq mi)

Population (2023 Census)
  - Total: 363
  - Density: 28.4/km^{2} (73.6/sq mi)

Newbury is a rural community in Palmerston North City and Manawatū District, in the Manawatū-Whanganui region in New Zealand's central North Island.

It includes the intersection of State Highway 3 between Palmerston North and Sanson, and State Highway 54 between Palmerston North and Feilding.

== History ==
The area was settled by English farmers in the late 19th century. Many settlers in the area, including the Gore family, were from Newbury, Berkshire.

The Newbury Country Women's Institute was established by women in the community in 1934. By 2014, it had changed its name to the Newbury Women's Institute and had 23 members aged 65 to 89.

In 2015, a driver was sentenced to community work over a fatal accident at the intersection of Newbury and Roberts Lines. The judge noted that roads in the area are very busy during rush hour due to the large number of people commuting into Palmerston North.

== Demographics ==
Newbury locality covers 12.78 km^{2} (4.93 sq mi). It is part of the larger Kauwhata statistical area.

Historical population for Newbury locality
Year	Pop.	±% p.a.
2006	309	—
2013	342	+1.46%
2018	327	−0.89%
2023	363	+2.11%

The locality had a population of 363 in the 2023 New Zealand census, an increase of 36 people (11.0%) since the 2018 census, and an increase of 21 people (6.1%) since the 2013 census. There were 189 males and 171 females in 129 dwellings. 1.7% of people identified as LGBTIQ+. There were 72 people (19.8%) aged under 15 years, 63 (17.4%) aged 15 to 29, 174 (47.9%) aged 30 to 64, and 54 (14.9%) aged 65 or older.

People could identify as more than one ethnicity. The results were 93.4% European (Pākehā), 15.7% Māori, 2.5% Pasifika, and 3.3% other, which includes people giving their ethnicity as "New Zealander". English was spoken by 97.5%, Māori by 3.3%, Samoan by 1.7%, and other languages by 1.7%. No language could be spoken by 0.8% (e.g. too young to talk). New Zealand Sign Language was known by 0.8%. The percentage of people born overseas was 5.8, compared with 28.8% nationally.

Religious affiliations were 26.4% Christian, 0.8% Māori religious beliefs, 0.8% New Age, and 0.8% other religions. People who answered that they had no religion were 63.6%, and 8.3% of people did not answer the census question.

Of those at least 15 years old, 66 (22.7%) people had a bachelor's or higher degree, 156 (53.6%) had a post-high school certificate or diploma, and 63 (21.6%) people exclusively held high school qualifications. 51 people (17.5%) earned over $100,000 compared to 12.1% nationally. The employment status of those at least 15 was 174 (59.8%) full-time, 57 (19.6%) part-time, and 6 (2.1%) unemployed.

=== Newbury statistical area ===
Newbury statistical area is part of Palmerston North city, and includes Bunnythorpe and Longburn, but does not include the Newbury locality in the Manawatū District, which is included in Kauwhata. It covers 34.67 km^{2} (13.39 sq mi) and had an estimated population of 1,960 as of June 2025, with a population density of 57 people per km^{2}.

Historical population for Newbury statistical area
Year	Pop.	±% p.a.
2006	1,806	—
2013	1,896	+0.70%
2018	1,905	+0.09%
2023	1,929	+0.25%

The statistical area had a population of 1,929 in the 2023 New Zealand census, an increase of 24 people (1.3%) since the 2018 census, and an increase of 33 people (1.7%) since the 2013 census. There were 975 males, 945 females, and 12 people of other genders in 684 dwellings. 2.6% of people identified as LGBTIQ+. The median age was 41.2 years (compared with 38.1 years nationally). There were 369 people (19.1%) aged under 15 years, 339 (17.6%) aged 15 to 29, 882 (45.7%) aged 30 to 64, and 339 (17.6%) aged 65 or older.

People could identify as more than one ethnicity. The results were 86.9% European (Pākehā); 19.3% Māori; 4.8% Pasifika; 4.8% Asian; 0.5% Middle Eastern, Latin American and African New Zealanders (MELAA); and 3.3% other, which includes people giving their ethnicity as "New Zealander". English was spoken by 97.4%, Māori by 3.0%, Samoan by 1.2%, and other languages by 5.8%. No language could be spoken by 2.2% (e.g. too young to talk). New Zealand Sign Language was known by 0.9%. The percentage of people born overseas was 10.6, compared with 28.8% nationally.

Religious affiliations were 31.1% Christian, 0.9% Hindu, 0.3% Islam, 0.8% Māori religious beliefs, 0.5% Buddhist, 0.6% New Age, 0.2% Jewish, and 0.5% other religions. People who answered that they had no religion were 58.2%, and 7.0% of people did not answer the census question.

Of those at least 15 years old, 246 (15.8%) people had a bachelor's or higher degree, 912 (58.5%) had a post-high school certificate or diploma, and 402 (25.8%) people exclusively held high school qualifications. The median income was $44,400, compared with $41,500 nationally. 144 people (9.2%) earned over $100,000 compared to 12.1% nationally. The employment status of those at least 15 was 837 (53.7%) full-time, 231 (14.8%) part-time, and 42 (2.7%) unemployed.

== Education ==
Newbury School is a co-educational state primary school for Year 1 to 8 students, with a roll of 198 as of July 2026. It opened in 1878 as Taonui School and took its current name in 1904.

It is a semi-rural school, with a mix of rural and urban students. A Sunday Star-Times investigation in 2016 found 39% of students were coming from out of the local school intake zone, compared to 11% nationally and 22% in the Manawatū-Whanganui Region.

Former deputy principal Adrienne 'Bud' Christensen has written a children's book for pre-schoolers on adjusting to primary school. She said she during her time the school, she had not found a book that "warmly introduces young readers to the wonderful world of primary school and helps them acclimatise to the school environment".

The school has introduced a wētā hotel, native bush, shade trees and vegetable gardens, as part of the Horizons Regional Council "enviroschools" programme.

The school takes part in Pink Shirt Day, an annual day in which students dress in pink to show their opposition to bullying.
