= Huntaway =

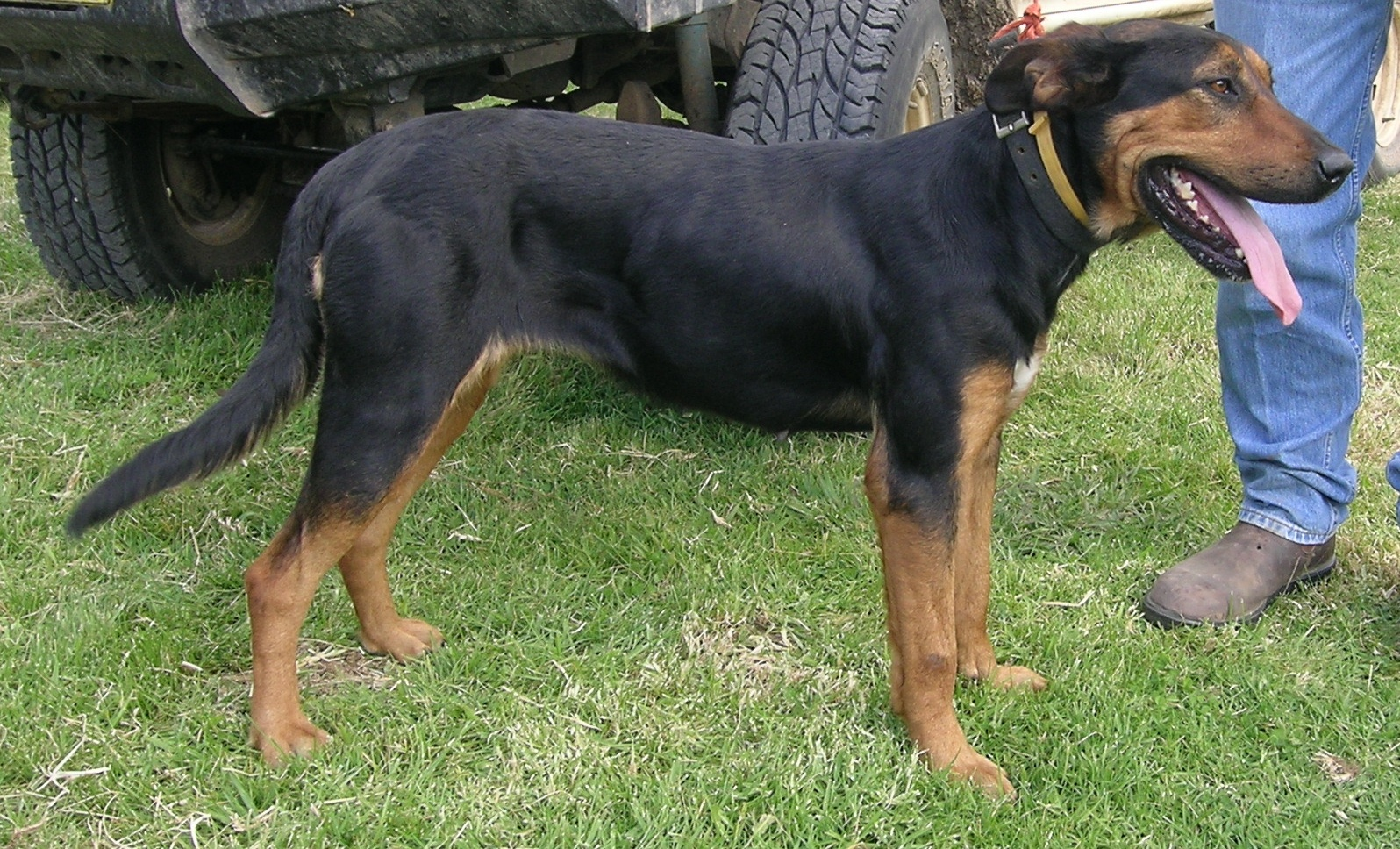
- A New Zealand Huntaway
- Other names: New Zealand Huntaway; New Zealand Sheepdog
- Origin: New Zealand
Traits
- Height: 56–66 centimetres (22–26 in)
- Weight: 25–40 kilograms (55–88 lb)
- Coat: smooth or rough (grizzled)
- Color: variable, commonly black and tan, tricolour
Kennel club standards
- New Zealand Kennel Club: standard

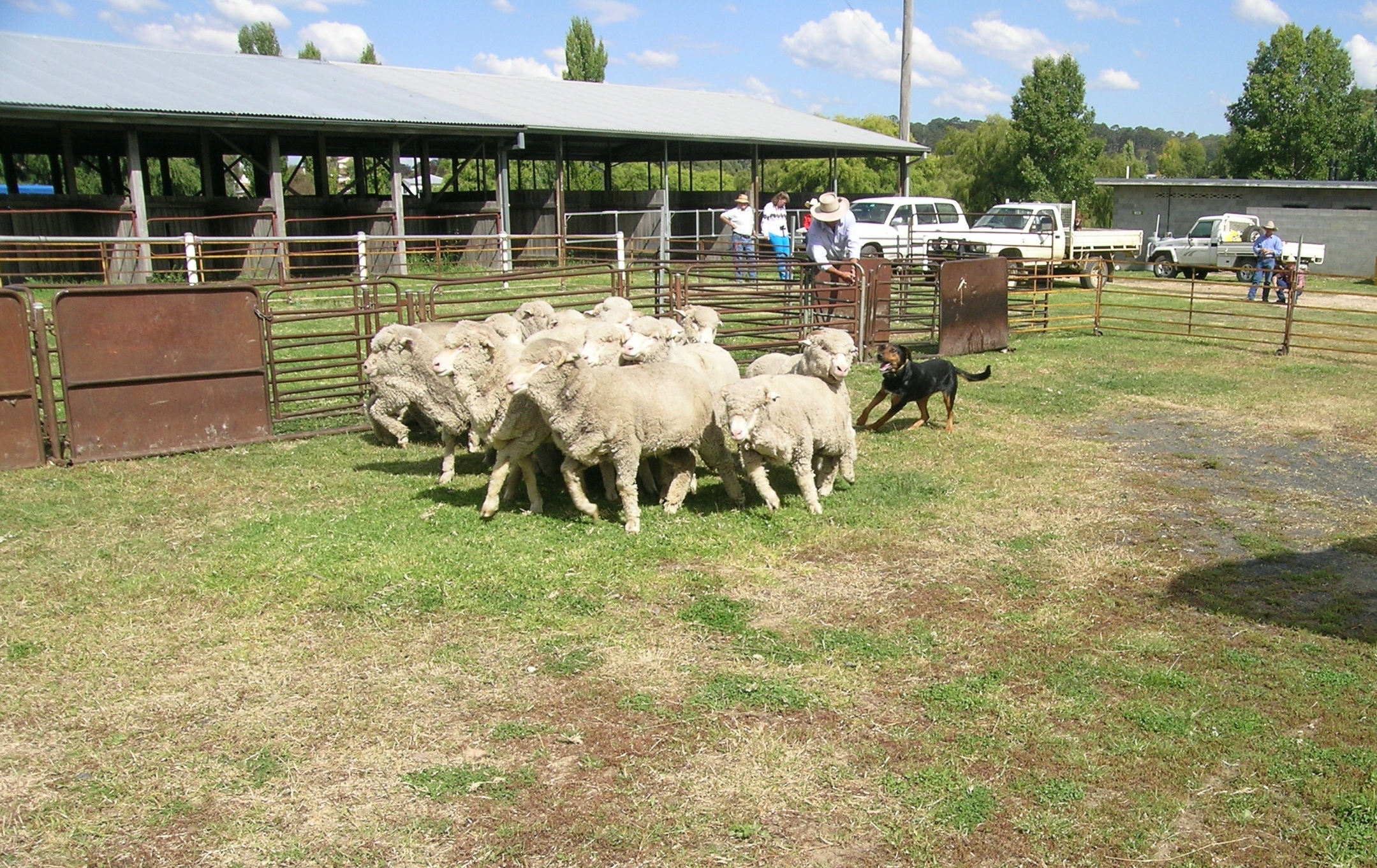
A Huntaway competing in a Yard Dog Trial

The Huntaway (also known as the New Zealand Huntaway) is a large, strongly built breed of dog used for general sheep-herding tasks in New Zealand, where they originate. They were bred to use their loud, deep bark to drive sheep.

The breed dates from the late-19th century, and is distinguished only on working ability. There is no prescribed appearance or lineage, but they are usually black-and-tan coloured. Only dogs that win at trials may be registered by the New Zealand Sheep Dog Trial Association in their studbook.

== Description ==
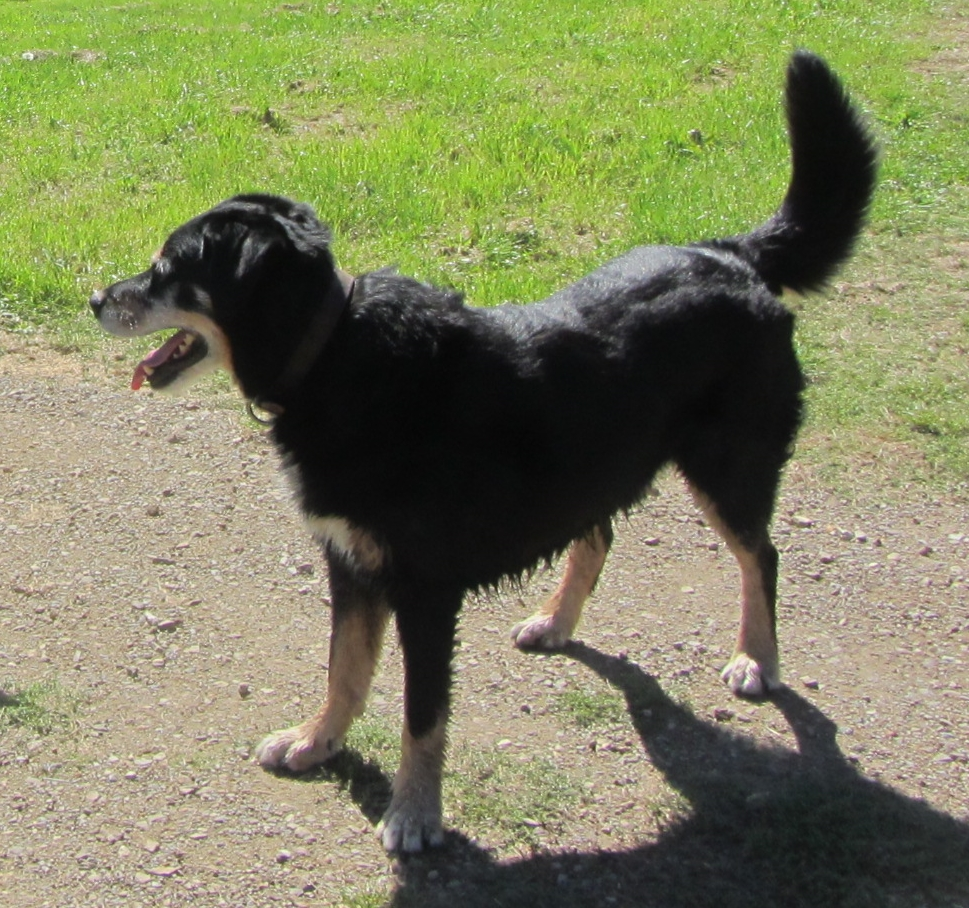
Huntaway: a working Huntaway of heavily built longhaired type

Huntaways are large, deep-chested dogs that generally weigh in the region of 25–45 kilograms (55–99 lb). Their coats can vary in colour; colours include black and tan (usually) with some white or brindle. Their coats can also come in different textures; they can be smooth, rough, or grizzly and they are generally floppy eared. A Huntaway's height is usually in the range of 56–66 centimetres (22–26 in).

They are required to have great intelligence, agility and stamina for days of working on steep, rough country over large distances, driving very large mobs of sheep. Their bark is deep and repeating, usually with a short pause between barks, which allows the barking to be sustained for very long periods.

== History ==
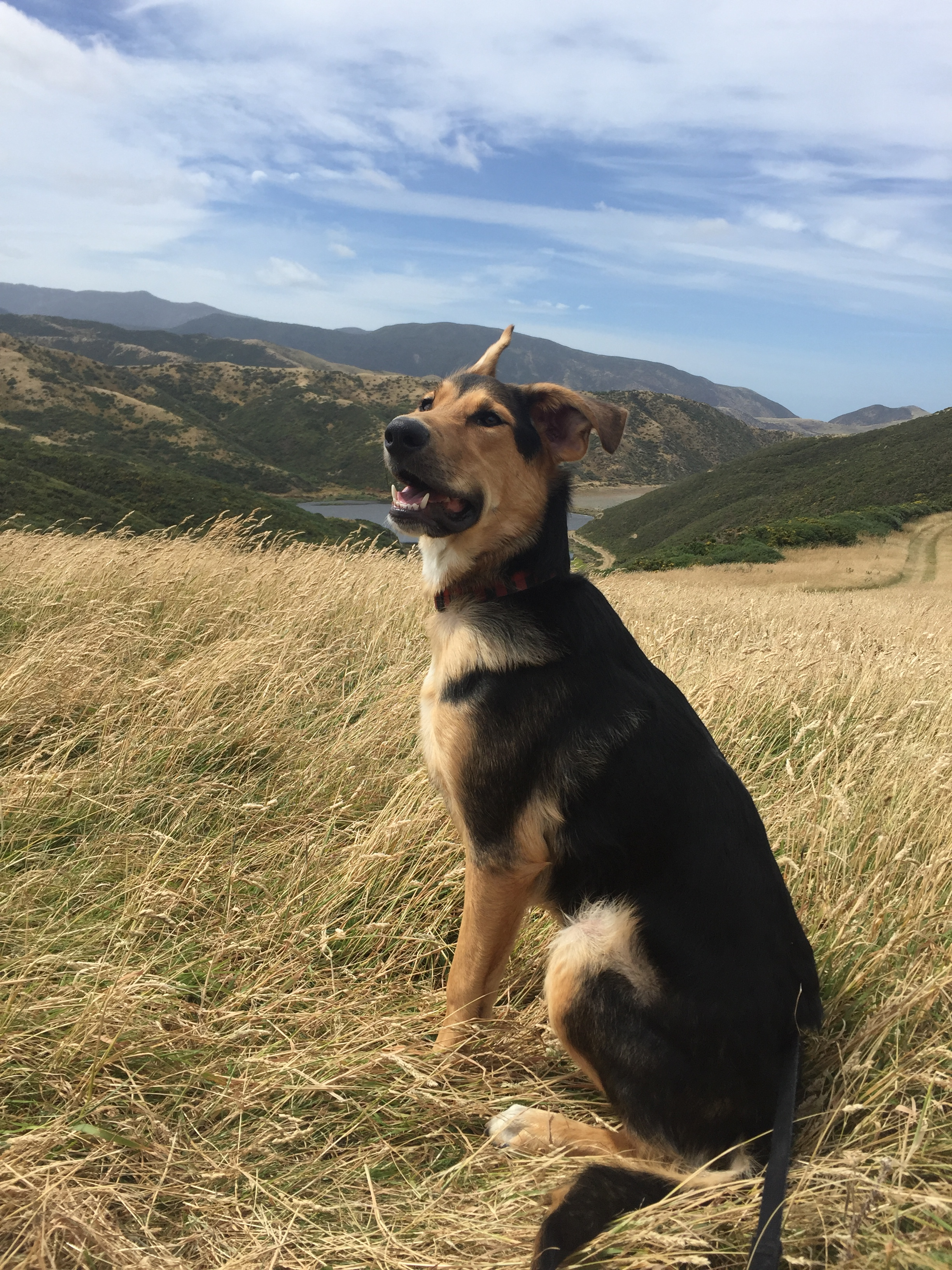
8-month-old Huntaway

The Huntaway was developed as a breed in response to farming conditions found in the New Zealand high country. The vast pastoral runs or "stations", such as those in the high country of the South Island, required teams of dogs who could work mustering for days on end, covering great distances on rough steep country. High country stations typically cover many thousands of hectares, and were often unfenced. British sheepdogs used by early New Zealand farmers mostly worked sheep silently, but occasionally a dog would use its bark to herd sheep. This characteristic was liked by some farmers, especially for driving sheep on rough, steep hill country where a dog may disappear from view, making a dog that drives stock by sight less useful. Collies and other working sheepdogs with the barking trait would have been crossed with any other breed that had other desirable traits, including size, stamina and a steady barking ability, as these are the traits that differentiate the Huntaway from the heading dog today, but the exact lineage is not known.

The earliest references to Huntaways are in the late 19th century. A sheepdog trial with a specific class for Huntaways was advertised in the Upper Waitaki in 1870. "Wanted" advertisements for "huntaway sheepdogs" were in the Otago Daily Times newspaper in 1884, heading and huntaway collies were advertised for sale in 1885. The Huntaway was further developed as a separate breed from the heading dog during the 20th century.

== Breed recognition ==
As of August 2013 the Huntaway breed was recognised by the New Zealand Kennel Club (NZKC). This is the first recognition of a dog breed of New Zealand origin. There is an NZKC standard for the Huntaway breed, but the standard notes:

It is the opinion of the New Zealand Sheepdog Trial Association that a Huntaway should never be shown, due to the large variance in colour, type and size and the inability to prove in a show ring their core (and only) task of working stock. It is the opinion of the New Zealand Sheepdog Trial Association that a New Zealand Huntaway should not be kept solely as a pet. No changes to the official breed standard of the New Zealand Huntaway will be made without consultation with the New Zealand Sheepdog Trial Association.

== Health ==
A possible predisposition to dilated cardiomyopathy has been identified in the breed.

Some hereditary diseases have been identified in Huntaways, these include: mucopolysaccharidosis, sub-aortic stenosis, black hair follicular dysplasia, and fetal anasarca.

== General information ==
They have been bred to muster in the hills and mountains of New Zealand where it is difficult to walk or ride, so worded commands and whistles are used to communicate commands to these dogs when they are at a distance. They are well known for being a noisy dog, especially when working. As of 2016, they were the second most common breed of dog registered in New Zealand, after Labrador Retrievers. Hunterville in the North Island of New Zealand is known for its statue of a Huntaway.

== See also ==
- List of dog breeds
