= Rangi Mawhete =

New Zealand land agent, politician (1880–1961)

The Honourable Rangi Mawhete OBE
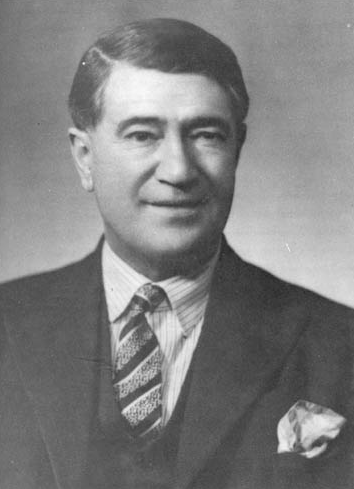

Member of the Legislative Council
- In office 9 March 1936 – 8 March 1950

Personal details
- Born: 4 March 1880 Tiakitahuna, Manawatu, New Zealand
- Died: 24 July 1961 (aged 81) Palmerston North, New Zealand
- Party: Labour Party

Rangiputangatahi Mawhete OBE (4 March 1880 – 24 July 1961), born as William Arthur Moffatt and commonly known as Rangi Mawhete, was a New Zealand land agent, interpreter and politician.

== Early life ==
Of Māori descent, he identified with the Muaūpoko and Rangitāne iwi. He was born in Tiakitahuna, Manawatu/Horowhenua, New Zealand on 4 March 1880. He was a grandson of the Rangitane chief Te Aweawe, and educated at Te Aute College.

== Political career ==
He unsuccessfully stood for Western Maori; in 1914 with an unknown political affiliation (of six candidates, he came fourth), in 1922 as an independent, and in 1925 for Labour. He organised a 1931 meeting between Ratana and Labour and organised the 1932 Māori Labour conference. In 1935 he warned against an exclusive Ratana-Labour alliance as dividing rather than uniting Māori.

He was a member of the Legislative Council for two terms from 9 March 1936 to 8 March 1950.

In 1953, Mawhete was awarded the Queen Elizabeth II Coronation Medal. In the 1959 Queen's Birthday Honours, he was appointed an Officer of the Order of the British Empire, for services to the Māori people.

== Death ==
He died in Palmerston North on 24 July 1961 and was buried in Terrace End Cemetery.
