= State Highway 57 (New Zealand) =

Road in New Zealand

State Highway 57

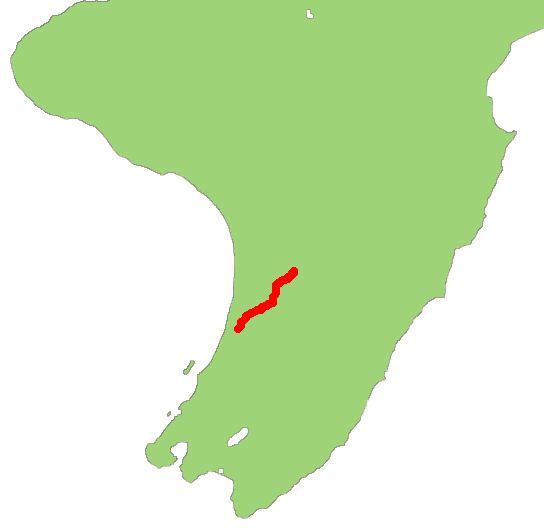

Route information
- Maintained by NZ Transport Agency Waka Kotahi
- Length: 65 km (40 mi)

Major junctions
- Southwest end: SH 1 near Levin
- SH 56 (Opiki Road) at Makerua
- Northeast end: SH 3 (Napier Road/Manawatū Gorge Road) near Ashhurst

Location
- Country: New Zealand
- Towns: Levin, Shannon, Palmerston North

Highway system
- New Zealand state highways; Motorways and expressways; List
← SH 56	→ SH 58

State Highway 57 (SH 57) is a New Zealand state highway, linking State Highway 1 north of Ohau to State Highway 3 east of Ashhurst, via Levin, Shannon, Massey University and the southern suburbs of Palmerston North. The highway connects State Highway 1 traffic coming north from Wellington to the city of Palmerston North, and further to the Manawatū Gorge, allowing passage to the eastern side of the North Island and to the twin cities of Napier and Hastings. The highway is classified by the NZTA as a national strategic road.

State Highway 57 broadly follows the route of the North Island Main Trunk railway line to Linton, then follows the route of the Manawatū River for the remainder of its length. For its entire length, the highway is single carriageway with occasional passing lanes and at-grade intersections.

== Route ==
State Highway 57 starts south of Levin, 2 km north of the locality of Ohau. The highway immediately crosses the North Island Main Trunk at level, before heading eastwards on Kimberley Road for two kilometres. SH 57 then turns sharply left onto Arapaepae Road and heads northwards, bypassing and forming the eastern boundary of Levin.

SH 57 proceeds straight to Ihakara, before gently winding its way over Laws Hill to the southeastern corner of the town of Shannon. The highway S-bends through the town, ending up running parallel to the North Island Main Trunk as it exits the town. SH 57 runs straight parallel to the NIMT for five kilometres to Makerua, where the highway meets SH 56 the only state highway met by SH 57 other than at its termini.

The highway moves its route away from the railway line, meandering to the east slightly and crossing the many branches of the Tokomaru River, a tributary to the Manawatū River. SH 57 then passes through Tokomaru, then briefly runs parallel to the NIMT again for the last time before the NIMT crosses the Manawatū River to Palmerston North.

SH 57 continues in a northeasterly direction through the locality of Linton, then proceeds to the Linton Military Camp, passing south of the actual camp itself. West of the military camp, SH 57 intersects with Tennant Drive, which takes traffic off the highway for the city of Palmerston North. As the connection from Tennant Drive to SH 57 southbound is given priority, SH 57 itself turns right onto Old West Road, passing south of the campus of Massey University, to Summerhill.

At Summerhill, SH 57 turns right onto Aokautere Drive, while the road to the left proceeds into Palmerston North. The highway passes north of the International Pacific College and through the outlying Palmerston North suburb of Summerhill. Leaving Summerhill, the road meets up with the Manawatū River and follows it general route for the remainder of the highways length.

At Aokautere, the highway intersects with the northern end of the Pahiatua Track, a local route over the northern foothills of the Tararua Ranges to the town of Pahiatua. This road is heavily trafficked in the event of the closure of the Manawatū Gorge due to slips. State Highway 57 between Aokautere and Ashhurst is then used to take traffic from State Highway 3 to the Pahiatua Track.

From Aokautere, the highway proceeds straight on the southern banks of the Manawatū River to the western end of the Manawatū Gorge. Two kilometres southeast of the town of Ashhurst, and one kilometre from the western end of the Manawatū Gorge, State Highway 57 meets State Highway 3 and terminates.

== History ==
SH 57 once started in central Levin, turning right off SH 1 Oxford Street into Queen Street East, then turning left onto Arapaepae Road. The route was later moved 4 km south to Kimberley Road, avoiding Levin.

The 19 km section of SH 57 between the Tennant Drive intersection and State Highway 3 at Ashhurst was once designated SH 57A. SH 57 itself used to follow Tennant Drive around the northern side of the Massey University campus, then cross over the Manawatū River on the Fitzherbert Bridge into Palmerston North. It followed Fitzherbert Avenue as far as Ferguson Street, where it terminated onto SH 56 which at the time connected to SH 3 via Ferguson Street and Princess Street. For a short time, SH 57 was then shifted further west, diverting onto Opiki Road terminating at Tiakitahuna with SH 56 (and covering part of the route SH 56 now occupies), and SH 57A was revoked. In 1997, SH 56 and 57 were significantly changed with SH 57 reverting to its former designation, but instead bypassing Palmerston North and taking the route of the former SH 57A to Ashhurst, a distance of 38.5 km.

== Major junctions ==
Territorial authority	Location	km	jct	Destinations	Notes
Horowhenua District	Ohau	0		SH 1 south— Wellington; SH 1 north — Levin, Taupō	SH 57 begins
Horowhenua District	Ohau	2		Kimberley Road; Arapaepae Road	
Horowhenua District	Levin	6		Queen Street East — Levin	
Horowhenua District	Shannon	20		Plimmer Terrace	
Horowhenua District	Makerua	26		SH 56 — Palmerston North (Alternative Route)	
Horowhenua District	Tokomaru	36		Tane Road	
Palmerston North City	Tokomaru	36		Tane Road	
Palmerston North City	Linton Military Camp	46		Tennant Drive — Palmerston North	Former SH 57 route to central Palmerston North
Palmerston North City	Summerhill	50		Summerhill Drive — Palmerston North	
Palmerston North City	Aokautere	54		Pahiatua Track — Pahiatua	
Palmerston North City	Ashhurst	65		SH 3 west — Ashhurst, Palmerston North; SH 3 east — Woodville, Napier	SH 57 ends

== See also ==
- List of New Zealand state highways
