= Artsplash Festival =

Student arts festival

Wellington's annual Artsplash Festival is New Zealand's largest student arts festival, and comprises over 100 primary and intermediate schools from the lower North Island and over 18,000 students and audience members. Venues are the Michael Fowler Centre, Capital E, and the Opera House. The two-week programme includes music, dance, choir, and theatre, as well as a major visual arts exhibition of student work. Other components include films for young people at the New Zealand Film Archive Mediaplex, workshops at Wellington Arts Centre, and class tours of Te Whaea, Bats Theatre, and the Royal New Zealand Ballet. The mission of the Festival is to encourage teachers and classes to explore the creative process and to gain confidence in presenting the results. Artsplash is a celebration of thousands of talented students and their artistry.

Artsplash, also known as 'Wellington's Young People's Arts Festival', was founded by a group of arts leaders in 1986, and managed first by the city's community arts officer Neal Palmer, and later Eric Vaughn Holowacz. The creative programming has become an annual part of the curriculum for participating schools. The Festival is now funded and fully managed by Wellington City Council, and is a partnership between venues, specialist educators, and the schools in Wellington Region.
