= State Highway 56 (New Zealand) =

Road in New Zealand

State Highway 56

Route information
- Maintained by NZ Transport Agency Waka Kotahi
- Length: 22.9 km (14.2 mi)

Major junctions
- West end: SH 57 (Makerua Road) at Makerua
- East end: Maxwells Line in Palmerston North

Location
- Country: New Zealand

Highway system
- New Zealand state highways; Motorways and expressways; List
← SH 54	→ SH 57

State Highway 56 is a New Zealand state highway. It begins at SH 57 at Makerua and runs north-east to Palmerston North from the West. The state highway officially terminates on Pioneer Highway at its intersection with Maxwells Line just at the entrance to the city.

== History ==
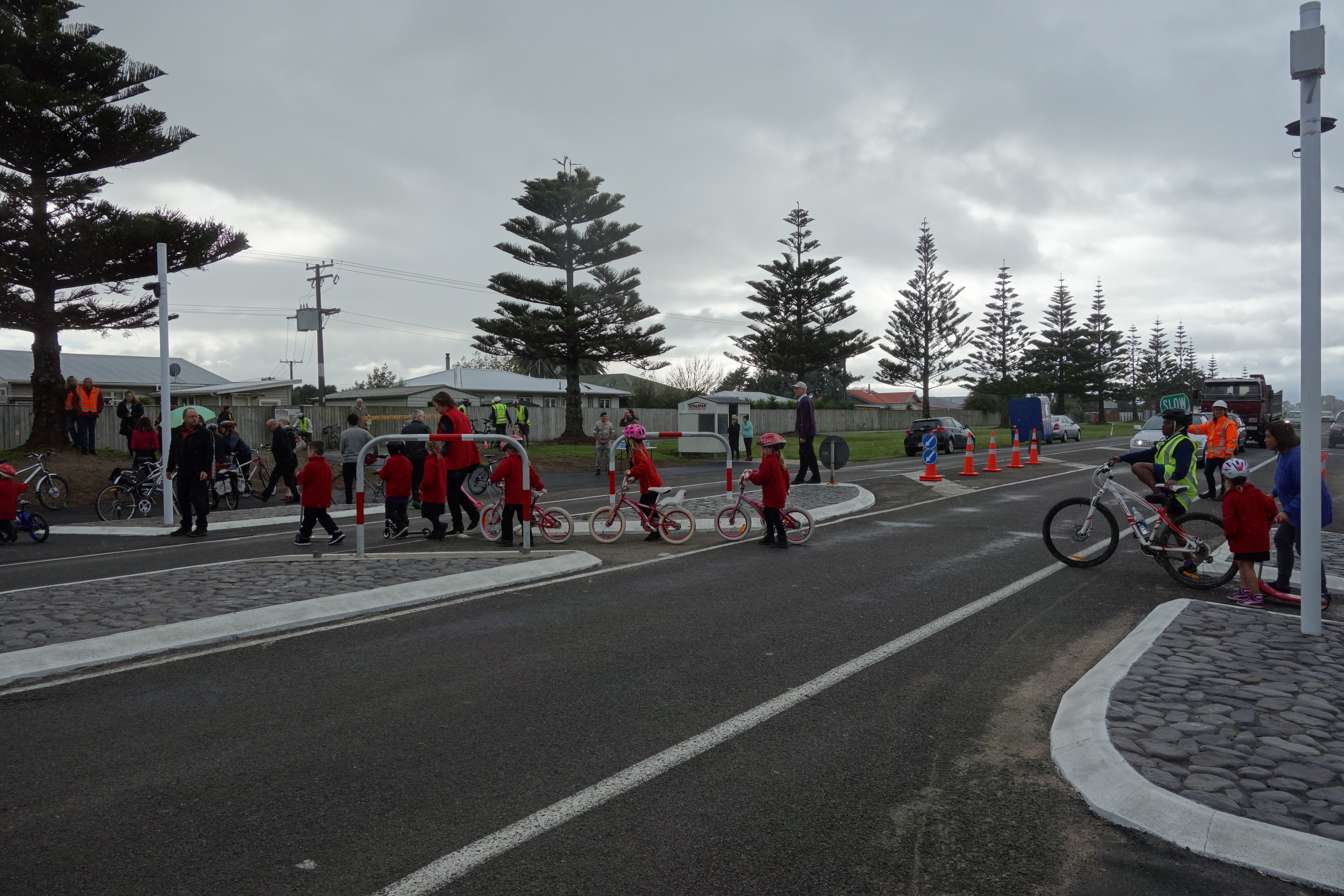
Children from Longburn School crossing SH56

SH 56 used to connect SH 1 at Himatangi with SH 3 in Palmerston North (at the intersection of Main and Princess Streets). It was rerouted to intersect SH 57 instead in 1997, with the section between Maxwells Line and its intersection with SH 3 also being revoked.

== See also ==
- List of New Zealand state highways
