= Tiakitahuna =

Tiakitahuna Jackeytown
- Interactive map of Tiakitahuna
- Coordinates: 40.404°S 175.502°E
- Country: New Zealand
- Region: Manawatū-Whanganui
- District: Manawatū District

Area
  - Total: 32.54 km^{2} (12.56 sq mi)

Population (2023 Census)
  - Total: 216
  - Density: 6.64/km^{2} (17.2/sq mi)

Tiakitahuna is a rural locality in the Manawatū-Whanganui region of New Zealand.

== History ==
Tiakitahuna was established in 1868. A pā was once there beside the Manawatū River, but is now gone. The name Tiakitahuna was anglicised to Jackeytown.

Tiakitahuna railway station opened for the Foxton Branch on 27 April 1876 and closed on 19 July 1957. It had a passenger service until 20 August 1932.

Jackeytown School opened in 1882 and had a roll of 39 in 1884. The school was still operating in 1912.

== Rocket ==
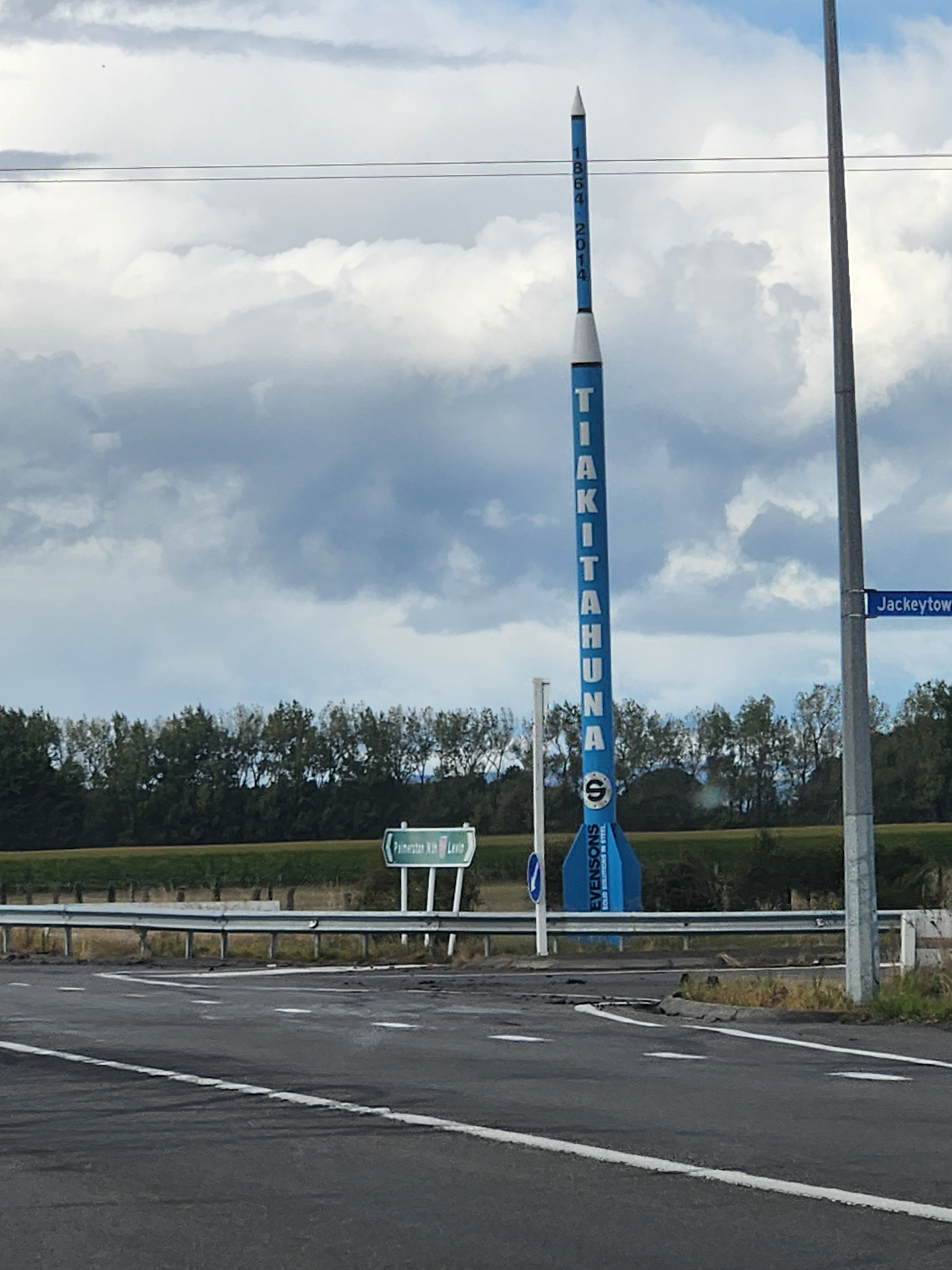
Tiakitahuna rocket in 2025

On the corner of State Highway 57 and Jackeytown Road, there is a model of a blue rocket with the text "Tiakitahuna" and "1864 2014". It was placed there to celebrate the centenary of the settlement, around the time of the Apollo Moon missions, and originally was white and with red fins. It was renovated in the 1980s and at some point had its colour changed to mostly red. In 2014, for Tiakitahuna's 150th anniversary, the rocket was remodelled and earthquake strengthened, changing its colour to blue.

== Geography ==
The Manawatū River is on the south-west side of Tiakitahuna. North of the river is Karere Lagoon, an Oxbow lake of the river.

== Demographics ==
Tiakitahuna covers 32.54 km^{2} (12.56 sq mi). It is part of the larger Kauwhata statistical area.

Historical population
Year	Pop.	±% p.a.
2006	249	—
2013	225	−1.44%
2018	222	−0.27%
2023	216	−0.55%

Tiakitahuna had a population of 216 in the 2023 New Zealand census, a decrease of 6 people (−2.7%) since the 2018 census, and a decrease of 9 people (−4.0%) since the 2013 census. There were 105 males and 111 females in 81 dwellings. 1.4% of people identified as LGBTIQ+. There were 42 people (19.4%) aged under 15 years, 30 (13.9%) aged 15 to 29, 102 (47.2%) aged 30 to 64, and 42 (19.4%) aged 65 or older.

People could identify as more than one ethnicity. The results were 93.1% European (Pākehā), 11.1% Māori, 1.4% Pasifika, and 2.8% Asian. English was spoken by 95.8%, Māori language by 1.4%, Samoan by 1.4%, and other languages by 5.6%. No language could be spoken by 4.2% (e.g. too young to talk). The percentage of people born overseas was 12.5, compared with 28.8% nationally.

The sole religious affiliation given was 38.9% Christian. People who answered that they had no religion were 56.9%, and 4.2% of people did not answer the census question.

Of those at least 15 years old, 24 (13.8%) people had a bachelor's or higher degree, 99 (56.9%) had a post-high school certificate or diploma, and 48 (27.6%) people exclusively held high school qualifications. 24 people (13.8%) earned over $100,000 compared to 12.1% nationally. The employment status of those at least 15 was that 90 (51.7%) people were employed full-time, 24 (13.8%) were part-time, and 3 (1.7%) were unemployed.

== Notable people ==
- Rangi Mawhete, land agent, interpreter and politician, born in Tiakitahuna
