= Capital E =

Organisation in Wellington, New Zealand

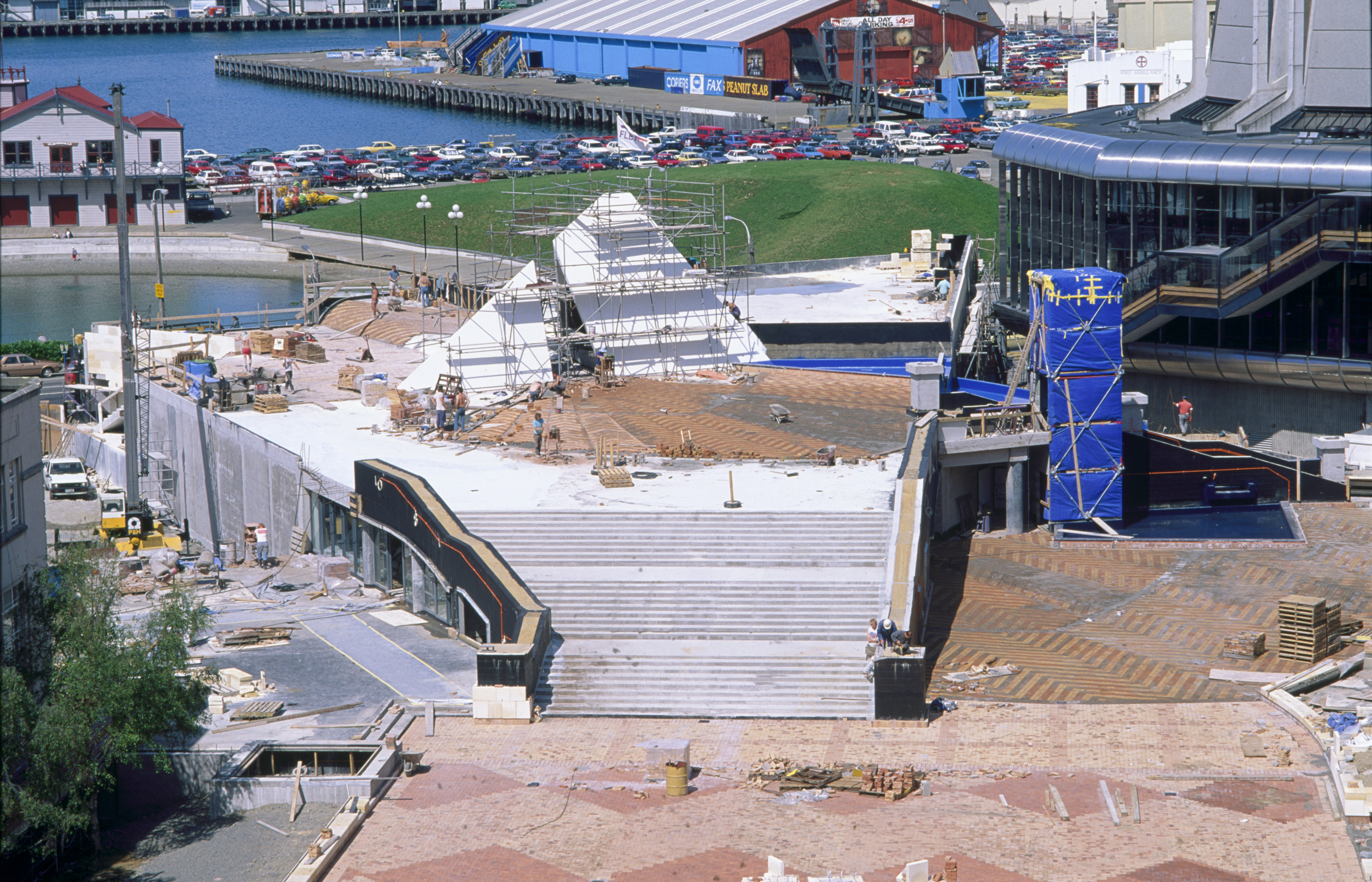
Construction of the Capital Discovery Place in Civic Square, Wellington

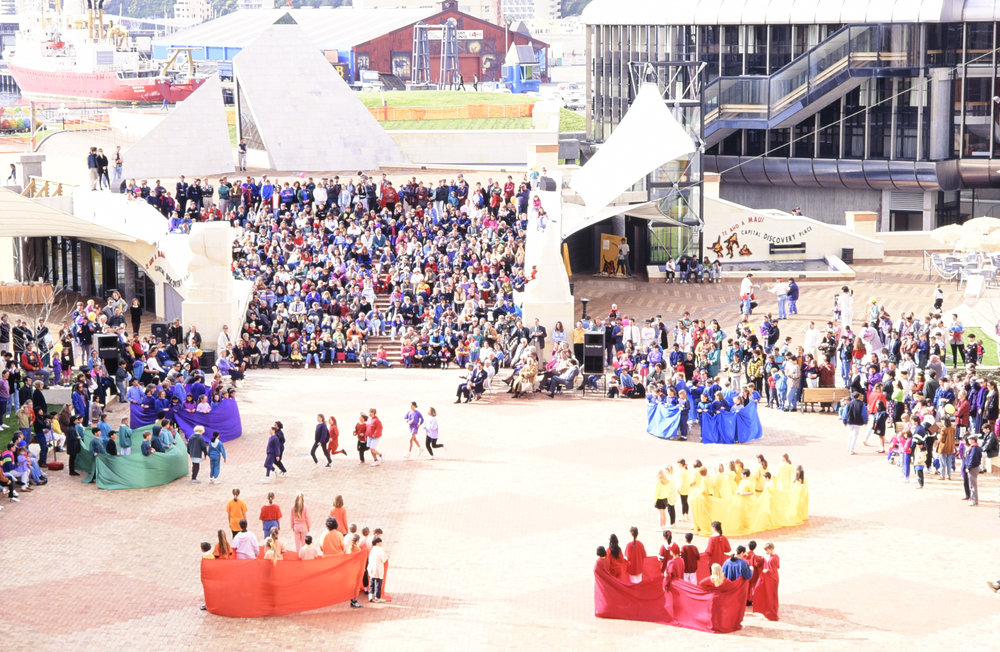
Opening of the Capital Discovery Place in Civic Square, Wellington

Nōku te Ao Capital E is an organisation in Wellington, New Zealand, that creates theatre, events and activities for children. It was established in 1992 and formerly named the Capital Discovery Place. Capital E is a council controlled organisation and part of Wellington City Council's Experience Wellington. Capital E runs a children's playspace and digital laboratories at their current premises in Wellington Central Library Te Matapihi ki te Ao Nui. The National Theatre for Children, MediaLab, OnTV Studio and the Capital E National Arts Festival are entities of Capital E.

== History ==
Capital Discovery Place, Te Aho a Maui opened as a children's science centre and technology museum in Te Ngākau Civic Square, Wellington in spring 1992. The concept was that the centre had a "strong New Zealand focus, with science treated as part of everyday life, and linked closely to arts and culture." The director who developed Capital Discovery Place, Te Aho a Maui was Philip Tremewan. It went into a purpose-designed building designed by Rewi Thompson and Ian Athfield. Capital Discovery Place was part of a global trend of centres with interactive exhibits to de-mystify science. Prior to the opening of Capital Discovery Place in 1990, an interim project, Video 90, was run between Te Papa and Capital Discovery Place, with nine young people from 11 to 17 years old recording to VHS and editing their views on 1990.

In 1997, the organisation changed its name to Capital E.

In 2013, the Capital E building in Te Ngākau Civic Square was yellow-stickered after an earthquake assessment triggered by the 2013 Seddon earthquake and Capital E had to stop operating from the site. It moved to 4 Queens Wharf, Wellington in the TSB Sports Arena building.

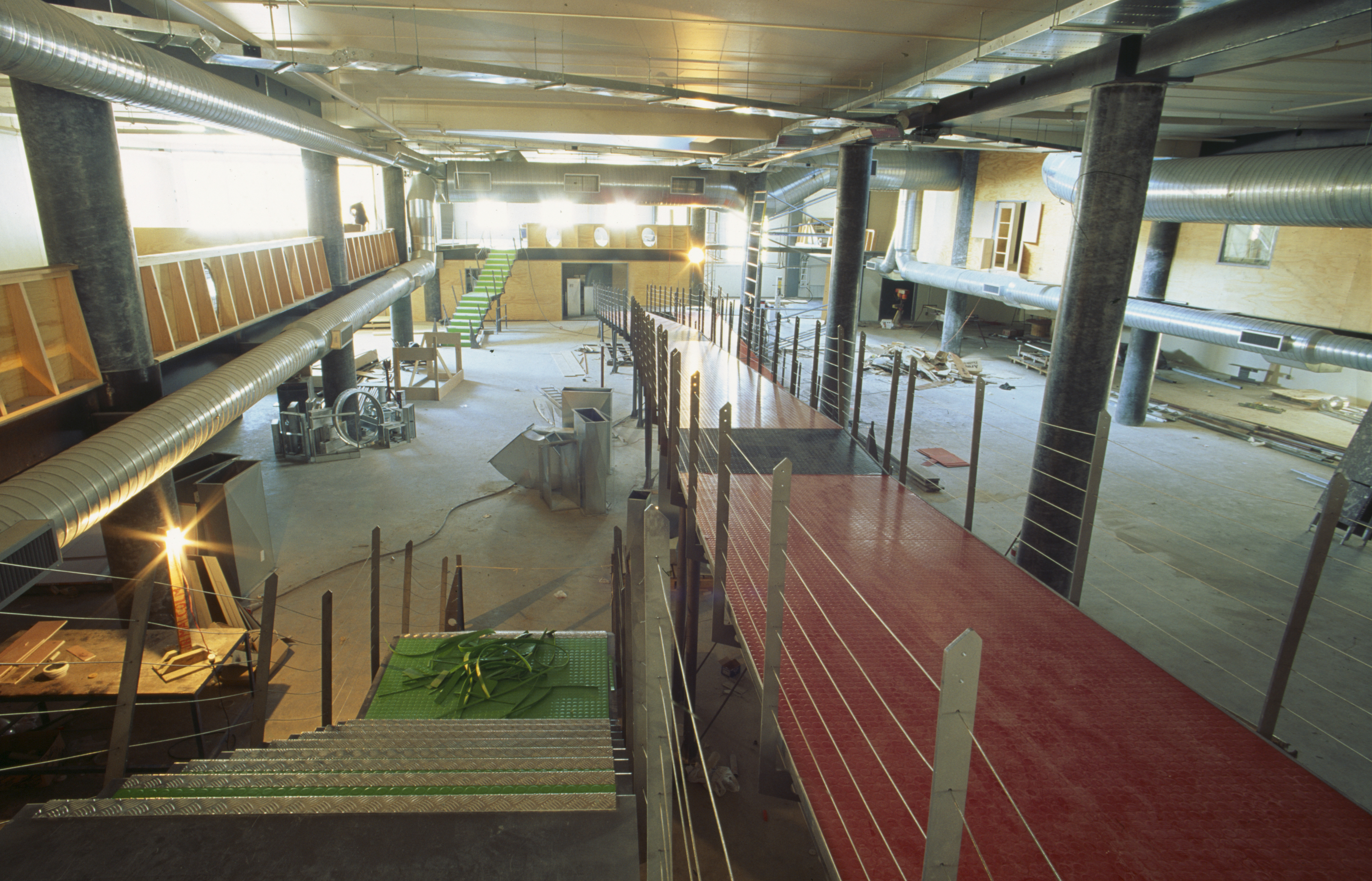
Interior during construction of the Capital Discovery Place in Civic Square, Wellington

Capital E moved back to Te Ngākau Civic Square as part of the renovated Wellington Central Library Te Matapihi, which opened in 2026.

== Areas ==
Capital E has three areas. A play space for children under five is located on the mezzanine level, modeled on the taniwha Ngake and Whāitaitai. The second floor of the library contains Te Rūma Pāpāho OnTV and Te Taiwhanga Arapāho MediaLab. OnTV is a television production studio, including a green screen and control room; students take on different roles, including director, presenter, and sound mixer. MediaLab is a computer suite where students engage in activities such as making video games.

== Organisation ==
Capital E is part of Experience Wellington which is the trading name of the Wellington Museums Trust, a registered charity established in 1995. Alongside Capital E, Experience Wellington also run the City Gallery Wellington, Wellington Museum, Space Place at Carter Observatory, Nairn Street Cottage, and the Cable Car Museum.

At the beginning of 2023 there were 19 staff listed at Capital E including four at the National Theatre For Children part of Capital E. The director was Justine McLisky.

== National Theatre for Children ==
The Capital E National Theatre for Children started in 1997. In 2023 it was led by Kathy Watson (Manager & Producer) and Lynne Cardy (artistic director). In October 2023, Experience Wellington announced that it would close the National Theatre for Children, blaming financial issues and falling visitor numbers.

=== Selected performances ===
2007 Songs of the Sea, New Zealand tour to 14 centres and Australia

2007 Hinepau

2007 REM-Zone, co-produced by Footnote Dance and Capital E

2014 Mr McGee & the Biting Flea based on books by Pamela Allen, produced by Capital E and Patch Theatre Company at the Hannah Playhouse

2022 Kiwi Moon based on the book by Gavin Bishop, adapted by Rachel Callinan

== Capital E National Arts Festival ==
The Capital E National Arts Festival is an event that programs theatre for children from New Zealand and overseas companies. The target age range is 2–14 years and the expected audience numbers are over 40,000 attendances.
