= Sportavex =

SportAvex is a contraction of Sport Aviation Exposition. It is a fly-in and air show organised by the Sport Aircraft Association New Zealand Incorporated (SAANZ).

This biennial event is the opportunity for homebuilders and other sport flyers to gather together and enjoy the spirit of camaraderie and competition with an aviation flavour. The event is held in alternate years with a similar but smaller event (Great Plains Flyin) held in the South Island. Each year, the top homebuilt aircraft completed in the preceding year are judged and champions are named and honoured. An airshow is conducted as part of the weekend's activities, featuring acts drawn from both the homebuilt/sport aviation and military aviation communities.

== List of venue/years ==
- 1994 - Paraparaumu
- 1996 -
- 1998 - Matamata
- 2000 - Matamata
- 2002 - Matamata
- 2004 - Tauranga
- 2006 - Tauranga
