= Kauwhata =

Rural locality in Manawatū-Whanganui Region, New Zealand

- Locality
- Interactive map of Kauwhata
- Coordinates: 40.296°S 175.539°E
- Country: New Zealand
- Region: Manawatū-Whanganui
- District: Manawatū District
- Ward: Manawatū Rural General Ward; Ngā Tapuae o Matangi Māori Ward
- Electorates: Rangitīkei; Te Tai Hauāuru (Māori)

Government
  - Territorial Authority: Manawatū District Council
  - Regional council: Horizons Regional Council
  - Mayor of Manawatu: Michael Ford
  - Rangitīkei MP: Suze Redmayne
  - Te Tai Hauāuru MP: Debbie Ngarewa-Packer

Kauwhata is a rural locality and a statistical area in Manawatū District, in the Manawatū-Whanganui region in New Zealand's central North Island.

The locality is named after a Māori chief who originally owned the land.

Kauwhata School existed at least between 1913 and 1928.

== Demographics ==
Kauwhata statistical area, which also includes Tiakitahuna, covers 154.43 km^{2} (59.63 sq mi) and had an estimated population of 2,200 as of June 2025, with a population density of 14 people per km^{2}.

Historical population for the statistical area
Year	Pop.	±% p.a.
2006	1,872	—
2013	1,917	+0.34%
2018	1,971	+0.56%
2023	2,085	+1.13%

The statistical area had a population of 2,085 in the 2023 New Zealand census, an increase of 114 people (5.8%) since the 2018 census, and an increase of 168 people (8.8%) since the 2013 census. There were 1,068 males, 1,014 females, and 3 people of other genders in 720 dwellings. 2.6% of people identified as LGBTIQ+. The median age was 41.6 years (compared with 38.1 years nationally). There were 426 people (20.4%) aged under 15 years, 345 (16.5%) aged 15 to 29, 990 (47.5%) aged 30 to 64, and 324 (15.5%) aged 65 or older.

People could identify as more than one ethnicity. The results were 91.1% European (Pākehā); 15.0% Māori; 1.3% Pasifika; 3.2% Asian; 0.3% Middle Eastern, Latin American and African New Zealanders (MELAA); and 3.2% other, which includes people giving their ethnicity as "New Zealander". English was spoken by 97.1%, Māori by 3.2%, Samoan by 0.3%, and other languages by 4.9%. No language could be spoken by 2.3% (e.g. too young to talk). New Zealand Sign Language was known by 1.0%. The percentage of people born overseas was 9.6, compared with 28.8% nationally.

Religious affiliations were 33.4% Christian, 0.7% Hindu, 0.3% Islam, 0.7% Māori religious beliefs, 0.1% Buddhist, 0.3% New Age, and 0.6% other religions. People who answered that they had no religion were 57.3%, and 6.6% of people did not answer the census question.

Of those at least 15 years old, 342 (20.6%) people had a bachelor's or higher degree, 966 (58.2%) had a post-high school certificate or diploma, and 348 (21.0%) people exclusively held high school qualifications. The median income was $49,200, compared with $41,500 nationally. 252 people (15.2%) earned over $100,000 compared to 12.1% nationally. The employment status of those at least 15 was 987 (59.5%) full-time, 258 (15.6%) part-time, and 21 (1.3%) unemployed.
