= Alpine Unity =

New Year festival in New Zealand

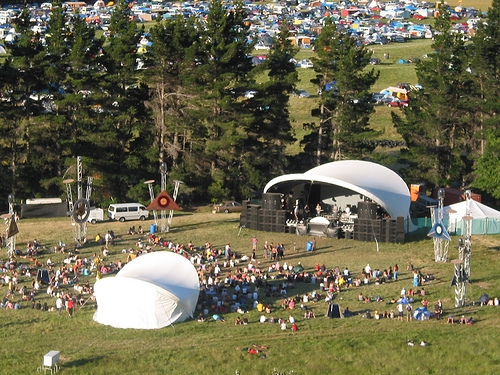
Alpine Unity Main Stage

Alpine Unity was a three night New Year festival in New Zealand. The first event took place in 2001 with two subsequent events taking place at Flock Hill, a high country station in the South Island. The largest event in 2002 had approximately 5000 attendees.

It was run as a limited liability company co-owned by Pacific Island Entertainment Ltd. and Middle Earth Productions Ltd., until two of the Directors of the company and the festival were implicated in a drug bust in 2003. Following the bust, the party was taken over by New Zealand Entertainment Service Ltd. and rebranded 'Alpine'. It carried on under the new name, eventually being superseded by Rhythm and Alps, which was created by the organisers of the Rhythm and Vines New Year festival in the North Island.

== Alpine Unity Line Up ==
Alpine Unity had many acts from around New Zealand, the most notable acts were:

- Shapeshifter
- Timo Maas
- John B
- The Black Seeds
- Fat Freddy's Drop
- Pitch Black
- Concord Dawn
- MC Tali
