= Cheltenham, New Zealand =

Cheltenham
- Settlement
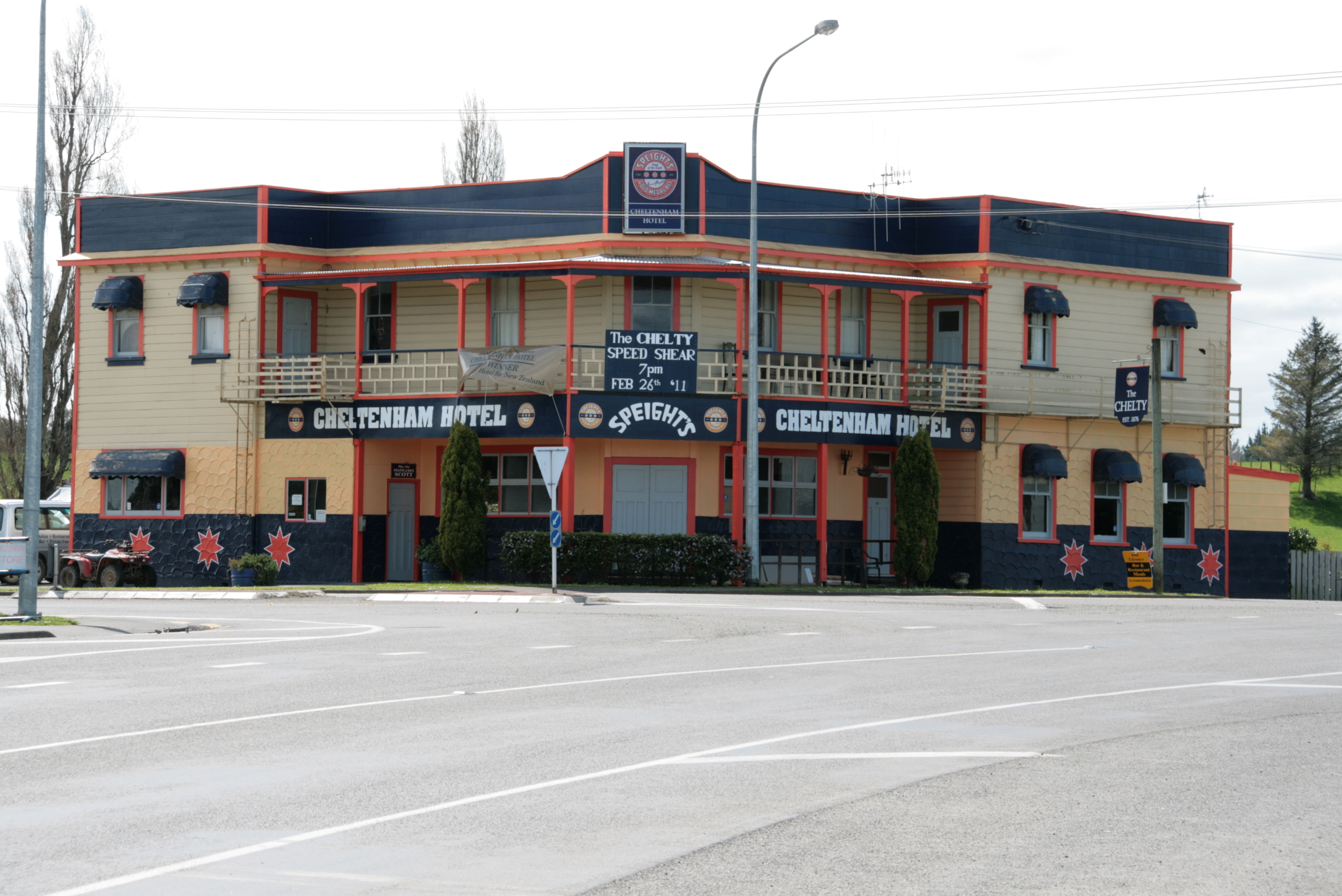
- Cheltenham Hotel
- Interactive map of Cheltenham
- Coordinates: 40.13883°S 175.65139°E
- Country: New Zealand
- Region: Manawatū-Whanganui
- District: Manawatū District
- Ward: Manawatū Rural General Ward; Ngā Tapuae o Matangi Māori Ward
- Electorates: Rangitīkei; Te Tai Hauāuru (Māori)

Government
  - Territorial Authority: Manawatū District Council
  - Regional council: Horizons Regional Council
  - Mayor of Manawatu: Michael Ford
  - Rangitīkei MP: Suze Redmayne
  - Te Tai Hauāuru MP: Debbie Ngarewa-Packer

Area
  - Total: 55.55 km^{2} (21.45 sq mi)

Population (2023 Census)
  - Total: 402
  - Density: 7.24/km^{2} (18.7/sq mi)
- Time zone: UTC+12 (NZST)
  - Summer (DST): UTC+13 (NZDT)
- Area code: 06

Cheltenham is a township 13 kilometres (8.1 mi) north-east of Feilding in the Manawatū District and Manawatū-Whanganui region in New Zealand's central North Island.

The settlement is named after Cheltenham in England, the home of one of the pioneer settlers, W. Mills. The town was home to the Cheltenham Co-operative Dairy Company, established in 1893. In 1920 the company moved their factory to Makino in Feilding.

The area falls within the Rangitikei electorate. Cheltenham Public School, which opened in 1886, closed in 2016 after 130 years of operating.

== Demographics ==
Cheltenham locality covers 55.55 km^{2} (21.45 sq mi).. It is split between the larger Tokorangi and Kiwitea statistical areas.

Historical population
Year	Pop.	±% p.a.
2006	366	—
2013	306	−2.53%
2018	375	+4.15%
2023	402	+1.40%

Cheltenham had a population of 402 in the 2023 New Zealand census, an increase of 27 people (7.2%) since the 2018 census, and an increase of 96 people (31.4%) since the 2013 census. There were 225 males, 174 females, and 3 people of other genders in 120 dwellings. 1.5% of people identified as LGBTIQ+. There were 99 people (24.6%) aged under 15 years, 84 (20.9%) aged 15 to 29, 159 (39.6%) aged 30 to 64, and 54 (13.4%) aged 65 or older.

People could identify as more than one ethnicity. The results were 80.6% European (Pākehā), 25.4% Māori, 5.2% Pasifika, 3.7% Asian, and 1.5% other, which includes people giving their ethnicity as "New Zealander". English was spoken by 97.0%, Māori by 9.7%, and other languages by 4.5%. No language could be spoken by 0.7% (e.g. too young to talk). The percentage of people born overseas was 11.2, compared with 28.8% nationally.

Religious affiliations were 31.3% Christian, 0.7% Hindu, 2.2% Māori religious beliefs, and 0.7% other religions. People who answered that they had no religion were 54.5%, and 8.2% of people did not answer the census question.

Of those at least 15 years old, 66 (21.8%) people had a bachelor's or higher degree, 159 (52.5%) had a post-high school certificate or diploma, and 69 (22.8%) people exclusively held high school qualifications. 45 people (14.9%) earned over $100,000 compared to 12.1% nationally. The employment status of those at least 15 was 159 (52.5%) full-time, 48 (15.8%) part-time, and 3 (1.0%) unemployed.

== Education ==
Hato Pāora College is a state-integrated boys' Catholic secondary school for Year 9 to 13 students, with a roll of 113 as of July 2026. It opened in 1948.
