= Hunterville =

Town in Manawatū-Whanganui, New Zealand

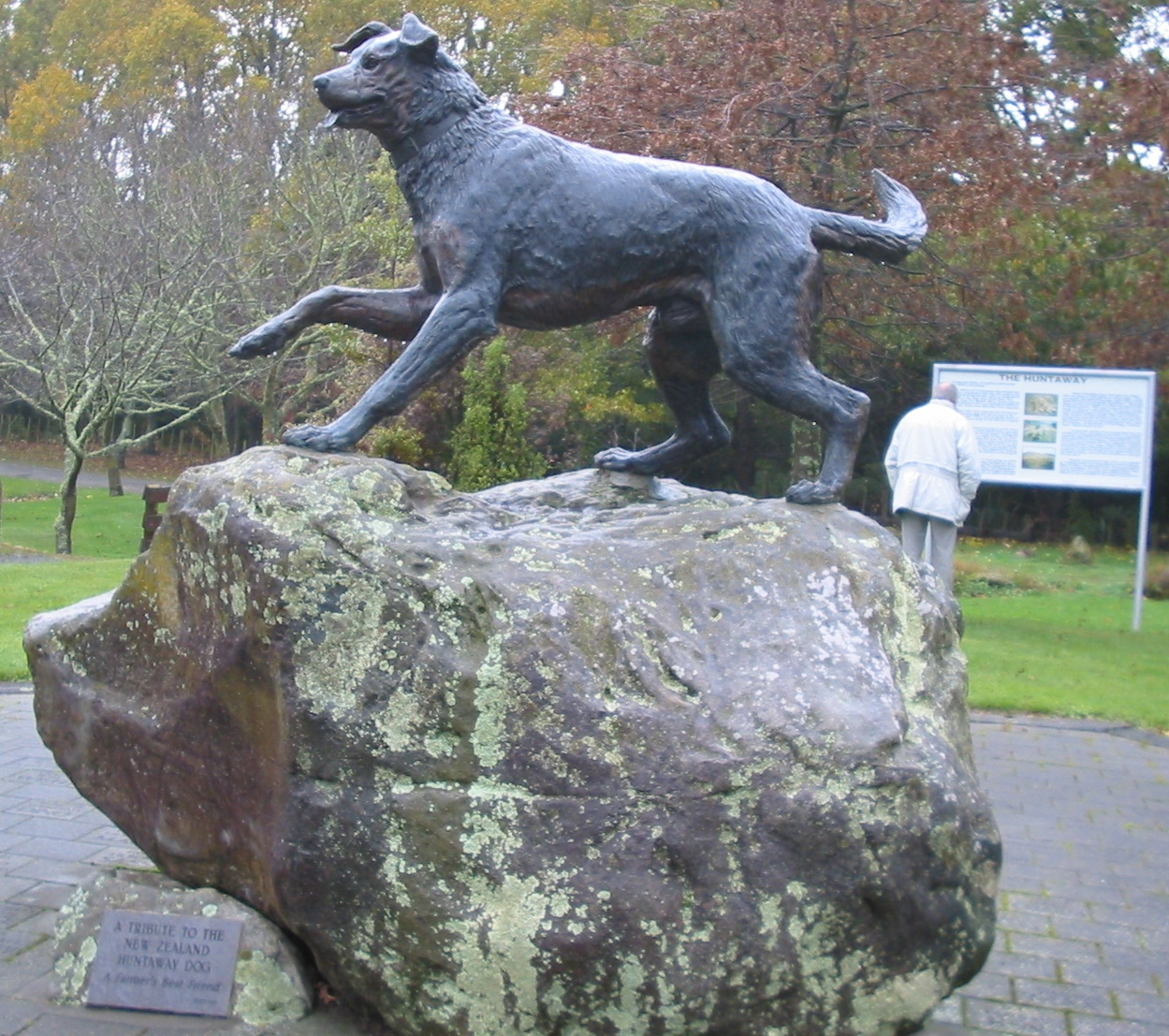
- Monument paying tribute to Huntaway dogs at Hunterville
- Interactive map of Hunterville
- Coordinates: 39°56′S 175°34′E
- Country: New Zealand
- Region: Manawatū-Whanganui
- District: Rangitikei District
- Wards: Central General Ward; Tiikeitia ki Uta (Inland) Māori Ward
- Electorates: Rangitīkei; Te Tai Hauāuru (Māori)

Government
  - Territorial Authority: Rangitikei District Council
  - Regional council: Horizons Regional Council
  - Mayor of Rangitikei: Andy Watson
  - Rangitīkei MP: Suze Redmayne
  - Te Tai Hauāuru MP: Debbie Ngarewa-Packer

Area
  - Total: 3.22 km^{2} (1.24 sq mi)

Population (June 2025)
  - Total: 390
  - Density: 120/km^{2} (310/sq mi)

Hunterville is a small town in the Rangitikei district of the North Island of New Zealand. It is located halfway between Taupo and Wellington on State Highway 1, and as of the 2018 census has a population of 408.

The township was named for George Hunter, who was a member of the Wellington Provincial Council. It straddles the state highway as well as the main trunk railway in the foothills forming the gateway to the Central Plateau.

The closest airport or airfield to Hunterville is RNZAF Base Ohakea, an important Royal New Zealand Air Force base, which is sited 33 km to the south west. 6 km north of Hunterville is Vinegar Hill.

Hunterville is well known for its statue of the huntaway, a specialised herding dog that uses its voice to drive the sheep. The town festival and market held on the first Saturday after Labour Day has a "Shepherds Shemozzle" – a race with man and dog with shepherds travelling from all over New Zealand to compete for the top prize.

There are marae south of the town at Rātā, which are affiliated with Ngāti Hauiti hapū. Tāhuhu Marae (or Taahuhu Marae) and Te Ruku a Te Kawau meeting house is a meeting place for Ngāti Haukaha. Rātā or Te Hou Hou or Potaka Marae and Hauiti meeting house are affiliated with Ngāti Ruaanga and Ngāti Tamateraka.

== History ==
From at least 1895 to 1948 the Hunterville Express was published in the town. It was one of 45 newspapers founded by Joseph Ives. Other editors were Cuthbert James Powell, Walter Keay, who was also a novelist and whose wife had earlier signed a suffrage petition in 1893, when women first gained a vote. In 1905 it was the Hunterville Express and Upper Rangitikei Advertiser, published 3 times a week. The Express offices were burnt out in 1917.

The Hunterville railway station on the North Island Main Trunk line opened in 1887 and closed in 1988.

The town's memorial for the First World War was unveiled in 1923.

Kiwiburn, the New Zealand Burning Man regional burn, has been held there since 2014.

== Demographics ==
Hunterville is described by Statistics New Zealand as a rural settlement. It covers 3.22 km^{2} (1.24 sq mi) and had an estimated population of 390 as of June 2025, with a population density of 121 people per km^{2}. It is part of the larger Otairi statistical area.

Historical population for Hunterville
Year	Pop.	±% p.a.
2006	444	—
2013	429	−0.49%
2018	411	−0.85%
2023	378	−1.66%

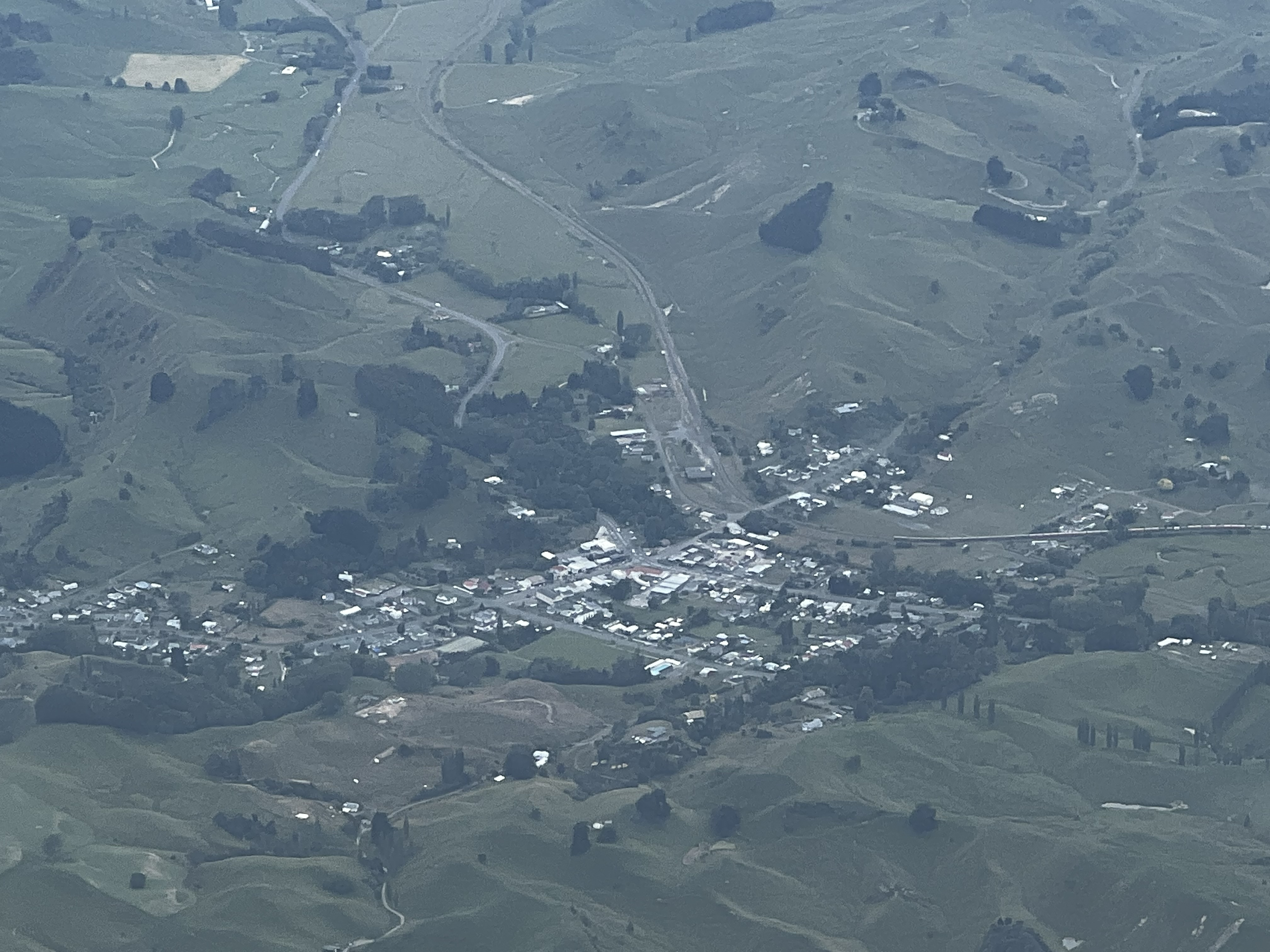
Aerial photo of Hunterville

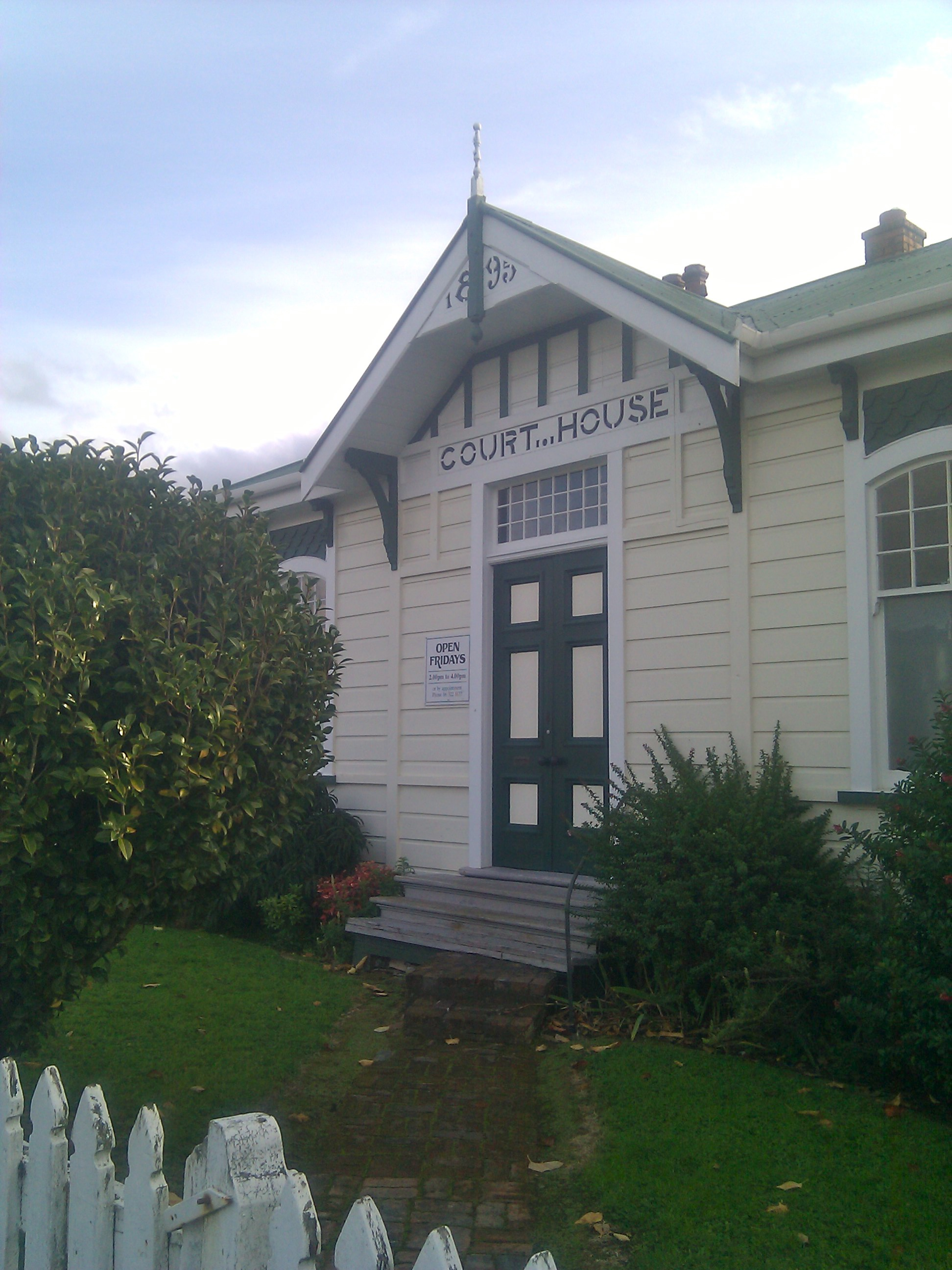
Hunterville Courthouse

Hunterville had a population of 378 in the 2023 New Zealand census, a decrease of 33 people (−8.0%) since the 2018 census, and a decrease of 51 people (−11.9%) since the 2013 census. There were 210 males and 171 females in 180 dwellings. 4.0% of people identified as LGBTIQ+. The median age was 53.6 years (compared with 38.1 years nationally). There were 42 people (11.1%) aged under 15 years, 39 (10.3%) aged 15 to 29, 180 (47.6%) aged 30 to 64, and 120 (31.7%) aged 65 or older.

People could identify as more than one ethnicity. The results were 78.6% European (Pākehā); 24.6% Māori; 3.2% Pasifika; 6.3% Asian; 3.2% Middle Eastern, Latin American and African New Zealanders (MELAA); and 6.3% other, which includes people giving their ethnicity as "New Zealander". English was spoken by 98.4%, Māori by 4.0%, and other languages by 9.5%. No language could be spoken by 1.6% (e.g. too young to talk). The percentage of people born overseas was 19.8, compared with 28.8% nationally.

Religious affiliations were 34.1% Christian, 0.8% Māori religious beliefs, 0.8% Buddhist, and 0.8% New Age. People who answered that they had no religion were 53.2%, and 10.3% of people did not answer the census question.

Of those at least 15 years old, 39 (11.6%) people had a bachelor's or higher degree, 186 (55.4%) had a post-high school certificate or diploma, and 120 (35.7%) people exclusively held high school qualifications. The median income was $28,400, compared with $41,500 nationally. 9 people (2.7%) earned over $100,000 compared to 12.1% nationally. The employment status of those at least 15 was 129 (38.4%) full-time, 48 (14.3%) part-time, and 15 (4.5%) unemployed.

=== Otairi statistical area ===
Otairi covers 636.76 km^{2} (245.85 sq mi) and had an estimated population of 1,270 as of June 2025, with a population density of 2.0 people per km^{2}.

Historical population for Otairi
Year	Pop.	±% p.a.
2006	1,287	—
2013	1,227	−0.68%
2018	1,272	+0.72%

Otairi had a population of 1,248 in the 2023 New Zealand census, a decrease of 24 people (−1.9%) since the 2018 census, and an increase of 21 people (1.7%) since the 2013 census. There were 648 males, 594 females, and 3 people of other genders in 513 dwellings. 1.9% of people identified as LGBTIQ+. The median age was 45.1 years (compared with 38.1 years nationally). There were 201 people (16.1%) aged under 15 years, 201 (16.1%) aged 15 to 29, 576 (46.2%) aged 30 to 64, and 270 (21.6%) aged 65 or older.

People could identify as more than one ethnicity. The results were 85.1% European (Pākehā); 19.2% Māori; 2.2% Pasifika; 3.6% Asian; 1.7% Middle Eastern, Latin American and African New Zealanders (MELAA); and 3.8% other, which includes people giving their ethnicity as "New Zealander". English was spoken by 97.4%, Māori by 3.4%, and other languages by 5.3%. No language could be spoken by 1.4% (e.g. too young to talk). The percentage of people born overseas was 11.8, compared with 28.8% nationally.

Religious affiliations were 32.2% Christian, 1.0% Māori religious beliefs, 0.2% Buddhist, 0.5% New Age, and 0.2% other religions. People who answered that they had no religion were 57.9%, and 7.9% of people did not answer the census question.

Of those at least 15 years old, 159 (15.2%) people had a bachelor's or higher degree, 618 (59.0%) had a post-high school certificate or diploma, and 270 (25.8%) people exclusively held high school qualifications. The median income was $35,300, compared with $41,500 nationally. 72 people (6.9%) earned over $100,000 compared to 12.1% nationally. The employment status of those at least 15 was 537 (51.3%) full-time, 180 (17.2%) part-time, and 33 (3.2%) unemployed.

== Education ==
Hunterville Consolidated School is a co-educational state primary school for Year 1 to 8 students, with a roll of 107 as of July 2026. It opened as Hunterville School in 1887. A secondary department operated between 1912 and 1929. Since then, the school has amalgamated with Silverhope (Paraekaretu) and Rata schools in 1937, Putorino and Mangaonoho schools in 1939, Pukiore in 1941, and Rata-iti school in 1952. The school took its current name in 1939.

== Notable people ==
- William Meldrum (1865–1964), solicitor in Hunterville and chairman of the Hunterville Town Board prior to WWI.
- Hadleigh Parkes (born 1987), professional Rugby Player, played for Super Rugby teams, Blues (Captain), Kings, and Hurricanes. Plays for Welsh regional team Scarlets (2014–) and was selected for the Welsh Test team in 2017.
