= Kiwiburn =

Burning Man event in New Zealand

- Locations: Hunterville, Manawatu-Wanganui region, New Zealand
- Inaugurated: 2004
- Most recent: 25–29 January 2024
- Participants: 2,163 [2020]
- Website: kiwiburn.com

Kiwiburn is a regional Burning Man event based in Hunterville, Manawatū-Whanganui, New Zealand celebrating principles such as inclusion, radical self-expression, gifting, participative art, communal effort, and culture.

== History ==
In 1994, Mark ‘Yonderman’ Stirling and his partner Jane discovered Burning Man by accident while on a camping trip in the Black Rock Desert, Nevada. Mark decided to stage the first regional burn in New Zealand in late 2003 as part of the South Island's Visionz festival. It was met with great enthusiasm from the participants, so the 2005 and 2006 burns took place as stand-alone events, attracting around 200 people (Mark co-ran these events with Grant ‘Tribalman’ Knowles, a friend and local drum-maker/festival organizer).

2007 marked the first year the festival was held in the North Island. In mid-2006, amidst the planning for the 2007 event, a group of highly enthused, motivated burners joined with Yonderman to form an organizational structure and bring the event north. The event was aptly named Megamorphosis, which means Massive Change. Kiwiburn has helped create a large community of burners around New Zealand, and the annual event, along with the occasional localized gatherings, continue to maintain its unique culture.

Kiwiburn celebrated its 10-year anniversary in 2013 with the theme enlighTENment, and its 20th anniversary in 2024 with Decadance.

After seven burns in Whakamaru Domain, Mangakino, Kiwiburn moved to a private farm in Hunterville in 2014. It was a huge undertaking to find a new site, close to a town and away from roads, where the locals immediately embraced the festival's culture.

The event is now held annually at the end of January.

In mid February 2025, Kiwiburn organisers confirmed they were investigating allegations of inappropriate behaviour at the 2025 Kiwiburn festival at Hunterville between 22 and 27 January. A person attending the festival told Radio New Zealand that several individuals had masturbated and had open sex in the presence of children following the burning of the effigy.

=== Past events ===
Year	Theme	Number of Participants	Date and Location
2007	Metamorphosis	145	9 – 11 February 2007, Mangakino
2008	CombustInUnity	182	1 – 4 February 2008, Mangakino
2009	Future History	270	5 – 8 February 2009, Mangakino
2010	Elementality	450	29 January – 1 February 2010, Mangakino
2011	Twisted Reality	530	26 – 31 January 2011, Mangakino
2012	Disaster Holiday	536	18 – 23 January 2012, Mangakino
2013	EnlighTENment!	754	23 – 28 January 2013, Mangakino
2014	Forgotten Dreams	783	22 – 27 January 2017, Hunterville
2015	Wyrd	954	21 – 26 January 2015, Hunterville
2016	Pot Luck and Emotion	1,485	27 January – 1 February 2016, Hunterville
2017	The Robots are Coming	1,635	25 – 30 January 2017, Hunterville
2018	The Grand Bizarre	1,809	24 – 29 January 2018, Hunterville
2020	Eclectic Decade	1,995	22 – 27 January 2020, Hunterville
2021	Mythical Picnic	2,219	27 January - 1 February 2021, Hunterville
2023	Time Travel	2,268	25 - 30 January 2023, Hunterville
2024	Decadance	1,761	24 - 29 January 2024, Hunterville
2025	Trash Renaissance Fair	TBC	22 - 28 January 2025, Hunterville

Kiwiburn did not run in 2019 due to difficulty obtaining resource consent, or in 2022 due to COVID-19.

== Themes ==
Each year's event is centered around an Art Theme, selected from community submissions.

== Culture ==
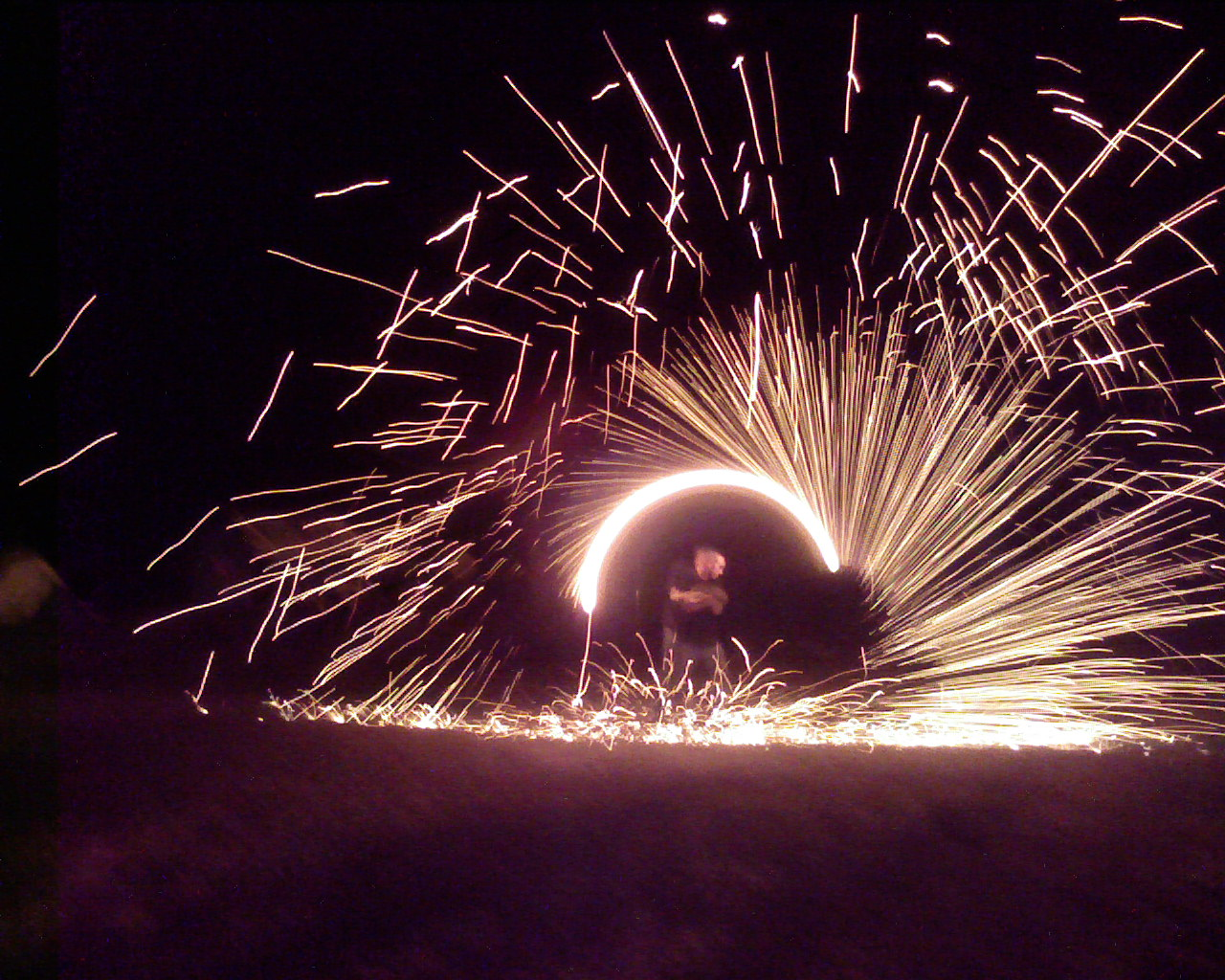
Fire poi at Kiwiburn '08

As a Regional Burning Man Event, Kiwiburn adheres to the ten principles of Burning Man. Among these are the Leave No Trace philosophy, radical self-expression, radical self-reliance, and communal effort.

Theme Camps are one of the key components of vibrant regional Burning Man events. Theme Camps are established by participants to enhance the experience for all participants. Theme Camps often put on events during Kiwiburn so that participants get to know each other and encourage each other to get more involved .

Notable, recurrent theme camps include "The Hangout", "Where did all our couches go?", "funkhutt", "The Flojo", "Pillowtopia", "DanceAlot", "Chur", "Taradise", "Swing Fling", and "Camp F*ck Yeah".
