= World Invitational Hula Festival =

The World Invitational Hula Festival is a three-day event that perpetuates Hawaiian culture as a celebration of the artistic rendering of the Hawaiian hula dance. The festival is in its 20th year of production and is the largest and furthest reaching event of its kind.

Thousands of participants from 16 countries have honed their hula skills throughout the years and participated in hundreds of events to secure travel to Hawaii each November. Hula artists from American Samoa, Canada, Germany, Guam, the Netherlands, Iran, Japan (14+ cities), Korea, Marianas, Mexico, Namibia, New Zealand, Pakistan, Philippines, Sweden, the continental United States (12+ cities), Western Samoa, and Hawaii participate in this on-going celebration of Hawaiian culture, art, music, dance, language, history and everything natural in the Hawaiian environment.
