= Vinegar Hill, New Zealand =

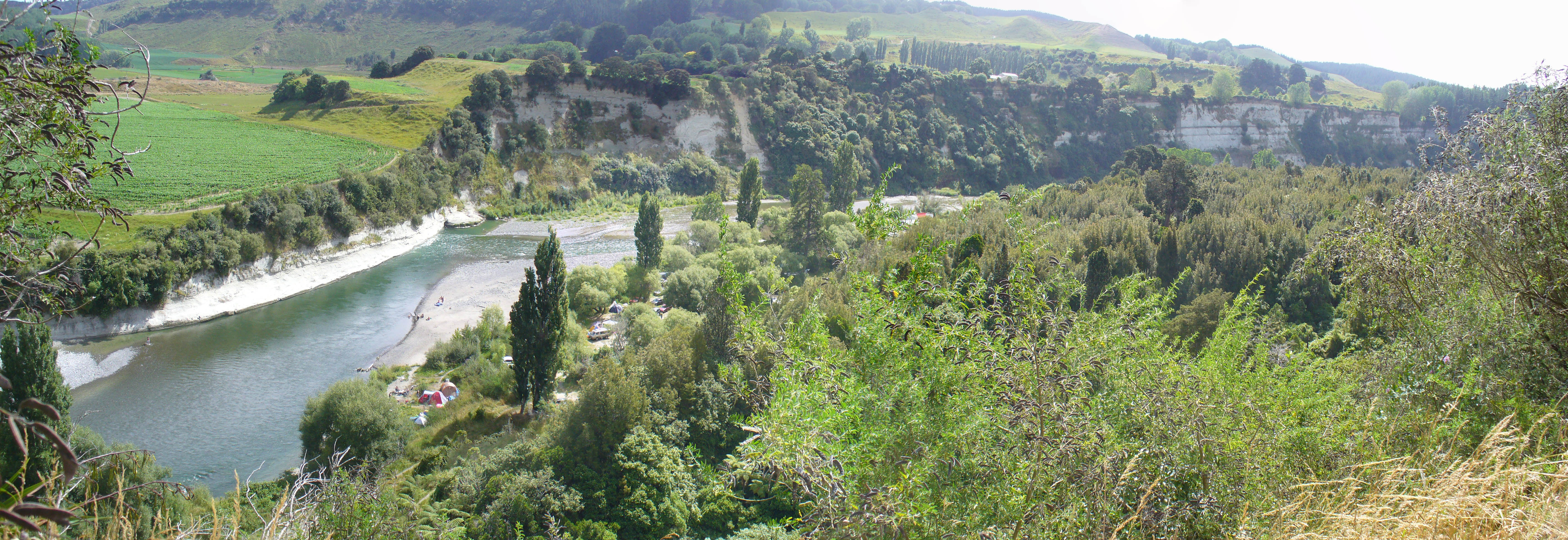
- Vinegar Hill campsite from the east bank of the Rangitikei River, 1 January 2009

- Location within New Zealand
- Coordinates: 39°56′15″S 175°38′27″E
- Country: New Zealand
- Region: Manawatū-Whanganui

Vinegar Hill is a locality on State Highway 1 in New Zealand's North Island. The name also refers to a camp at that locality and an annual Christmas celebration held at the camp.

== Location ==
Vinegar Hill is on the banks of the Rangitikei River within the Putai Ngahere Reserve, near the junction of State Highway 54 and State Highway 1, about 5 km north of Hunterville in the Manawatū-Whanganui region of New Zealand.

== Etymology ==
There is a misconception over how this Vinegar Hill was named. Some think that it is named after the Battle of Vinegar Hill in Ireland. However, the name was derived from a source closer than that. Vinegar Hill was named after an incident in early colonial times: a bullock cart carrying barrels of vinegar overturned after the bullocks slipped on the muddy track on the hillside, covering the hillside in vinegar from the broken barrels. The name of the reserve, Putai Ngahere, comes from a tōtara tree growing in the reserve.

== Campsite ==
In late summer 2004, massive flooding caused great damage to many parts of the Manawatū-Whanganui region. The campsite at Vinegar Hill was inundated with floodwater and the toilet block at the northern end of the site was destroyed. However, there was little damage to the southern end in comparison, where the LGBT camp is held, despite a line in the bush showed the floodwater had been over three metres deep. Nevertheless, the septic tank did need replacing, the toilets had to be cleared of silt, and the track leading past the beach had to be regraded.

New toilets have since been built at the northern end, consisting of several uni-sex toilets and lockable showers. The Manawatū District Council is evaluating the usefulness of these toilets, and whether they remain relatively free of graffiti, before replacing the toilets at the southern end with a similar block to comply with environmental codes requiring the septic tank to be further from the river.

== Queer history ==
Since 1977, Vinegar Hill has been a popular camping spot for gay and lesbian people and their families over Christmas and the New Year holiday period in the height of summer. Much of the following information comes from personal knowledge of those who have attended the camp. The first time gay men camped at Vinegar Hill was shortly after New Year in January 1977. This consisted of six men, among whom were Kevin and Pearl (Peter) and Owen, from the Manawatu and Hawkes Bay regions and Tom Fitzgerald from Silverstream Upper Hutt. It grew from there, and by the early 1980s had developed a particular culture. The first queen was appointed in 1985, for the 1986 camp. This was Bill Armstrong, who was presented with the award by Mal Vaughan, a popular bar operator from Wellington. Initially, the idea of "Queen of Vinegar Hill" was based on a comedic idea of beauty queens, but this later developed into an idea of appointed royalty. As a result, the initial names engraved on the trophy presented each year are the drag names of the people appointed to the role of queen. Honorary Life Member 'Queen Alex Ruth' from Peka Peka was recognised for his years of service in 2020. He is the first to be recognised for this prestigious award amongst the community.

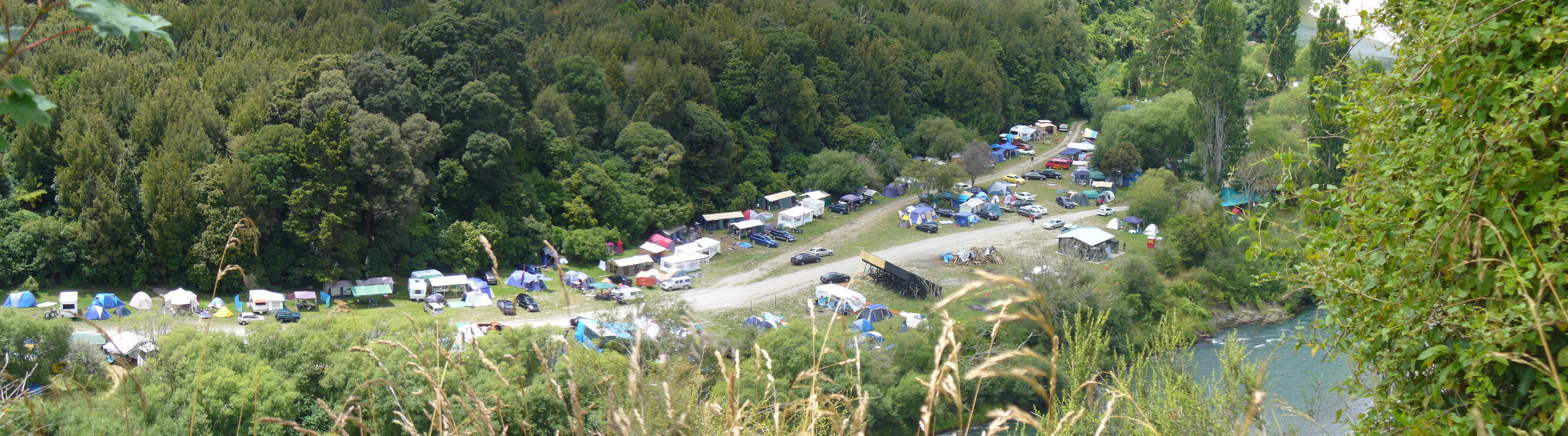
Vinegar Hill campsite from the west bank of the Rangitikei River, 31 December 2008

== Today ==
The Queen is appointed every year by all the former Queens who are present on 31 December. Only those who have been to Vinegar Hill for a number of years, and who have provided some particular service to the camp can be elected. It is part of the Queen's responsibilities to collect the camp fees on behalf of the council, and to organise events. These events include the entertainment on the nights of 30 and 31 December.

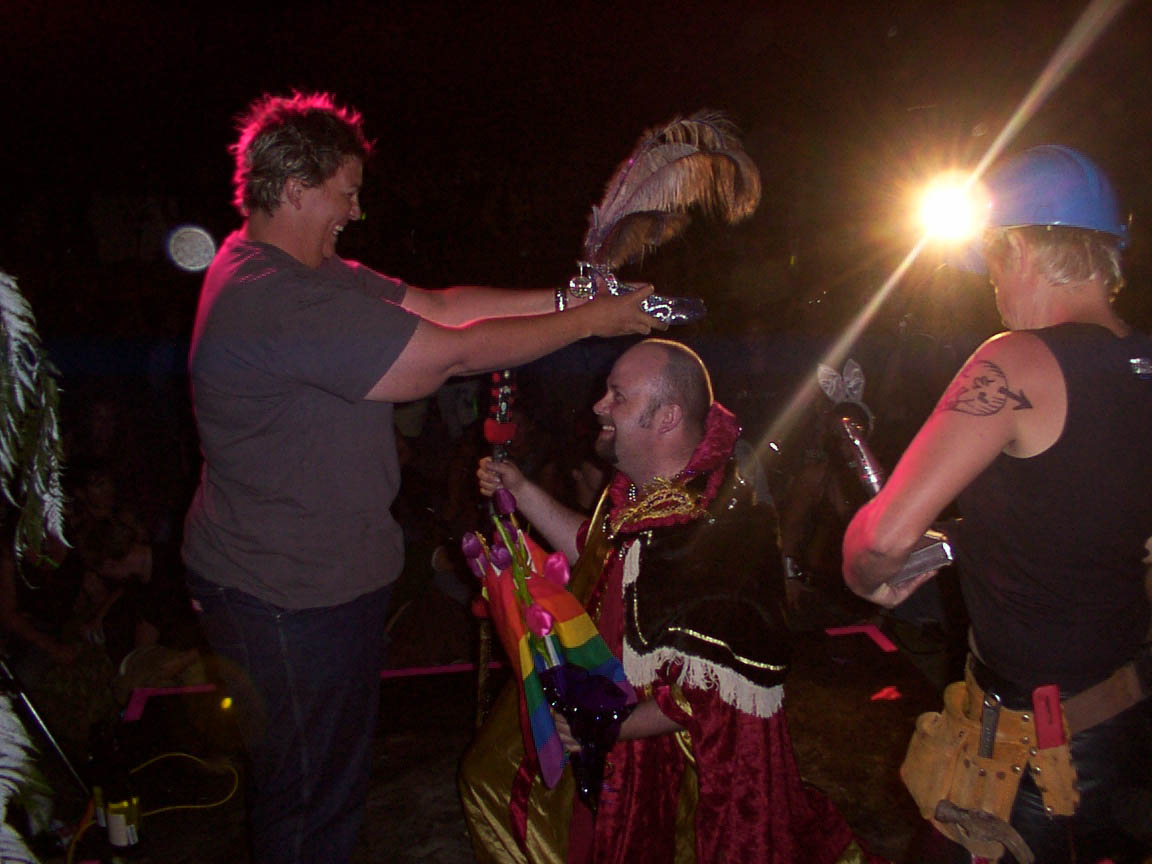
The Crown descends, 31 December 2005

The entertainment on 30 December usually consists of a series of competitions. Often this has consisted of best buns for men, best boobs for women, and best legs for all. Prizes are usually awarded to all competitors, but 1st and 2nd (and 3rd, depending on the number of competitors) get special prizes. This is usually followed by a large party around the campfire. Recently, however, movie nights have been shown on the evening of the 28th or 29th. There has also been a girls v boys softball game that has usually been won by the women, however, for the first time, the trophy was won by the men in 2011.

The entertainment on New Year's Eve often consists of a series of shows that continue up until prize giving. These shows are often drag queen/king performances, and some of them may have adult content. Prizes are awarded for Miss/Ms "Hospitality", and to recognise the 'camp' campsites, Best Use of Technology, Best Lighting, and Best Decorations. The most coveted of the campsite awards is the Best Campsite award. This is usually followed by the coronation of the new Queen, slightly before midnight, and followed by a dance party that lasts until dawn.

Although the weather is generally good, as with all campsites, at least one day of rain or other bad weather is to be expected. Some years are better than others in this respect, but there have been years when rain has been a major problem. In 2006, although it rained several days prior to 31 December, including 30 December (which meant the postponement of that night's entertainment), the rain was not heavy, and thus did not soak the ground. As a result, the fair weather on the 31st allowed the ground to dry sufficiently for the dance party.

The 2007 camp was perhaps one of the driest in recent years, with only a few showers happening between Christmas Day and 28 December. A short hail storm on the 25th, however, ensured a "white" Christmas before it melted in the warm temperatures. The lack of rain, and the higher temperatures, meant that the river was at its lowest level in a decade. This encouraged people to swim more often, and to take part in raft races down the river from a point about 1.5 km upstream of the road bridge, giving a total ride distance of about 2.5 km. There were no subsidiary competitions on 30 December in 2007, although two men had their Civil Union on the banks of the Rangitikei River that afternoon.

The 2008–2009 camp saw the reinstitution of competitions on 30 December, with Fashion in the Field and Pick a Purse being held on that night. There was little rain over the duration of the camp, with only light showers on Christmas Eve, and no rain at all between 25 December and 31 December. However, for the first time in the memory of those attending the camp, it rained over the New Year. A light shower fell just before the coronation of the New Queen, but about 10 minutes after the coronation, the rain began. Initially a moderate shower, it settled to a light, but warm shower, which began around 11.45 and went till after 2am on the 1st. This did not, however, dampen the party, which still went to 4am.

The 2008–2009 camp was also marked as being the first in which the local Hunterville Police patrolled the campsite on foot, rather than appearing in vehicles and doing a drive around on a random basis. As one person was caught trying to steal a wallet from a tent early on, and arrested as a result, their presence was welcomed by all.

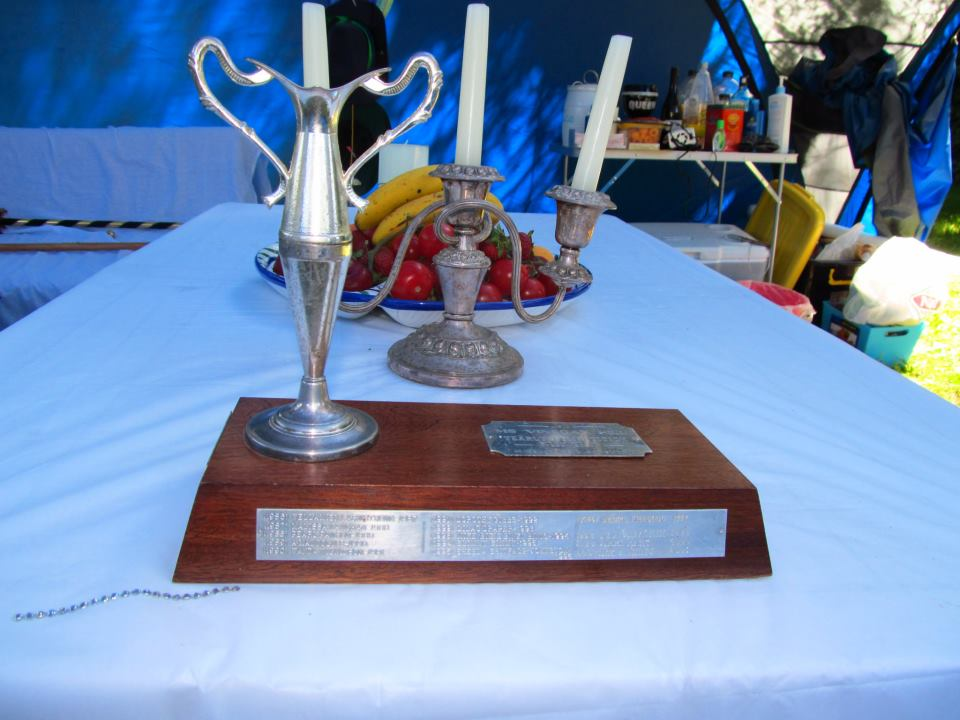
Vinegar Hill Trophy

At least one writer claimed that during the 2011–2012 camp "Mother Nature decid[ed] to spew forth rain, wind and mugginess", and as a result "some were packing up and heading for shelter". However, the weather from 21 December, when people started to arrive for the camp, until 29 December 2011 was sunny and dry. Although heavy rain fell on the evening of the 29th, (with showers starting just after the softball game), and on 30 December, the river did not rise until 31 December. Only three campsites left on the 30th: one because a tree fell on their tent; one because they had to return to Wellington; and one because they had camped in a dip, which flooded due to the rain. This was the only campsite which had to leave because of rain. Although there were a couple of showers on 1 January 2012, it was clear enough at night for an outdoor movie, and sunny enough on 2 and 3 January to allow tents and gear to dry as people were packing up.

The role of Queen has been filled by people from many parts of the North Island, including Wellington, Auckland, Hamilton, Manawatu, and the Hawkes Bay. Dion Leslie (2006–2007), then 26, was the first Queen to be appointed who was younger than the Camp, and is so far the youngest Queen to be appointed. Murray Smith (Muriel) of Wellington, Queen for the 2012 camp, has supplied aid and assistance to a number of queens over the past two decades, and whose campsite (69 Cock & Doodle Cottage, together with his friends, Steve and Gary), has hosted a number of events for the camp over the years.

In 2017, the first straight people to be elected Queen were Tisha and her husband Ian Klein; Tisha as an official camp photographer and Ian as a lighting and sound technician.

The following list a complete list of the Queens appointed:

Number	Year of Coronation	Name	Year of Reign	Years since camp began
1	1985	Wellamiena Armstrong	1986	10
2	1986	Mal Kennedy-Vaughan (née Vaughan)	1987	11
3	1987	Pearl Pawson	1988	12
4	1988	A-Malcolm-B	1989	13
5	1989	Wanda Wilkinson	1990	14
6	1990	Dorothy Gibbs	1991	15
7	1991	Lilac Draper	1992	16
8	1992	Mike "Bikie Binzi" Binis	1993	17
9	1993	Slimmy Simmy	1994	18
10	1994	Sheela Shitface Johnston	1995	19
11	1995	Daniel Fielding	1996	20
12	1996	Ian Heteraka [1]	1997	21
13	1997	Lyn and Heather	1998	22
14	1998	Jimmi Hart	1999 [2]	23
15	1999	Kim and Chris	2000	24
16	2000	Neil Day	2001	25
17	2001	Geoff Robinson	2002	26
18	2002	Calum Bennachie	2003	27
19	2003	Colin Waterhouse	2004	28
20	2004	Toni Farrow	2005	29
21	2005	Marc Smith	2006	30
22	2006	(Celine) Dion Leslie	2007	31
23	2007	Jenni James	2008	32
24	2008	Daniel Corney	2009	33
25	2009	Aaron King	2010	34
26	2010	Lynette Knox	2011	35
27	2011	Murray Smith (Muriel)	2012	36
28	2012	Andrew Morgan (Nurse Gladys)	2013	37
29	2013	Shane Young	2014	38
30	2014	David Playle	2015	39
31	2015	Iria Pene	2016	40
32	2016	Andrew Fletcher	2017	41
33	2017	Ian and Tisha Klein	2018	42
34	2018	Gary Duncan	2019	43
35	2019	Jamie Gardner	2020	44
36 [3]	2020	Shayno Baron	2021/22	45 / 46
37	2022	Samantha Harrison	2023	47
38	2023	Paul Gibson	2024	48

=== Notes ===
[1] Ian's name was not initially engraved on the trophy, causing confusion among following queens, and it was not until after 2006 that his name was remembered. The queens appointed on either side of him were unavailable for consultation to confirm this earlier.
[2] The running of the 1999 camp, the Millennial Camp, was taken over by Deus, a Wellington group that ran dance parties. This caused considerable controversy.
[3] Due to the effect of the COVID-19 pandemic and the lockdowns, there was no queen elected in 2021 for 2022. Queen Shayno continued to reign until the next election in 2022 for 2023.

== See also ==
- LGBT in New Zealand
