= Public holidays in Norfolk Island =

This is a list of public holidays in Norfolk Island

Date	Holiday
1 January	New Year's Day
26 January	Australia Day
6 March	Norfolk Island Foundation Day
	Good Friday
	Easter Monday
25 April	Anzac Day
8 June	Bounty Day
Second Monday in June	King's Birthday
Second Monday in October	Norfolk Island Agricultural Show
Fourth Wednesday in November	Thanksgiving Day
25 December	Christmas Day
26 December	Boxing Day

== See also ==
- Public holidays in Australia
