= Bunnythorpe railway station =

Defunct railway station in New Zealand

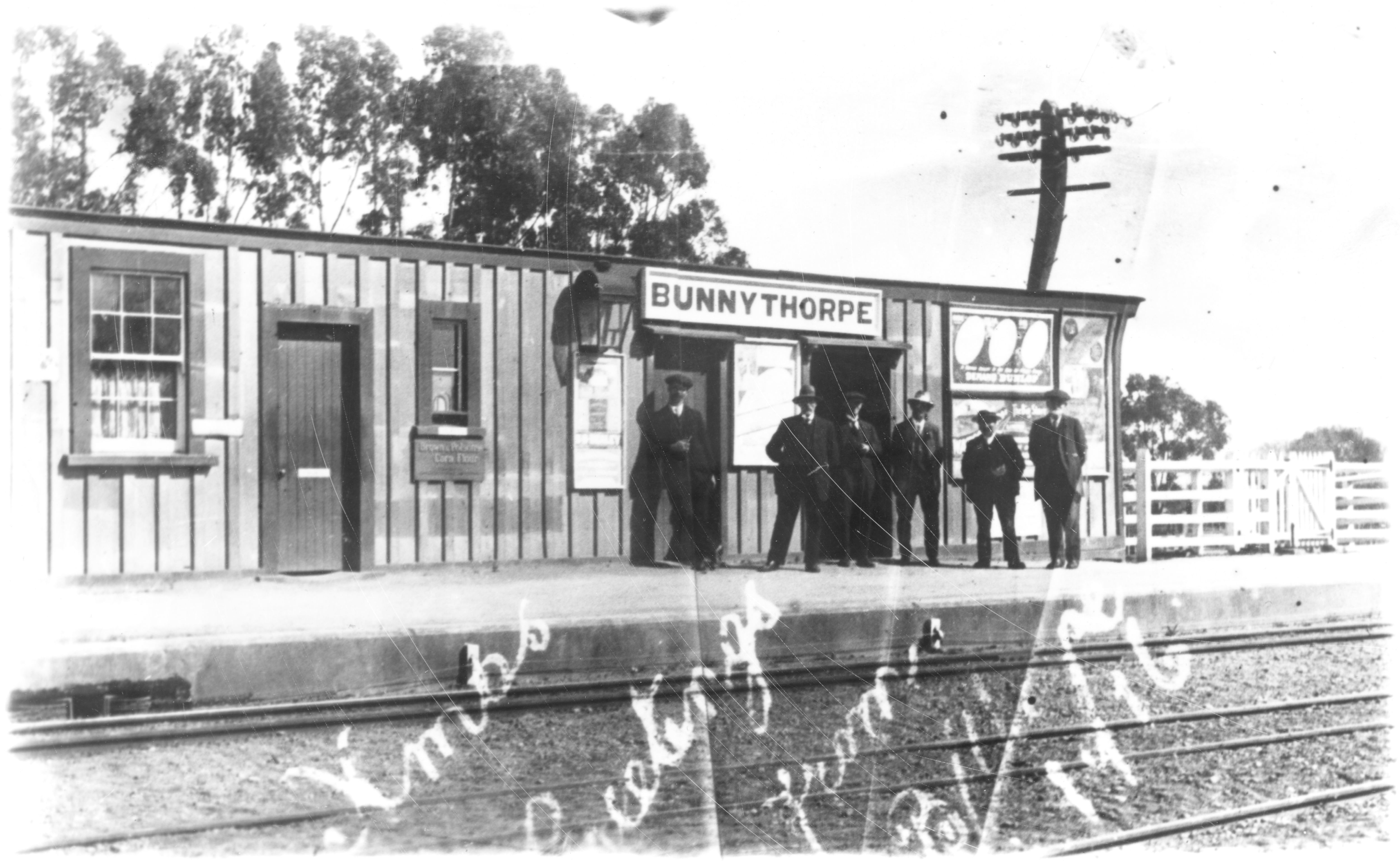
- Bunnythorpe about 1916

General information
- Location: New Zealand
- Coordinates: 40.283532°S 175.631532°E
- Elevation: 55 m (180 ft)
- Owner: KiwiRail
- Line: North Island Main Trunk
- Distance: Wellington 144.75 km (89.94 mi)
- Platforms: 1

History
- Opened: 19 October 1876
- Closed: Passengers 13 April 1985; Goods 6 December 1981
- Electrified: 25 kV 50 Hz AC June 1988

Services
Preceding station	Historical railways	Following station
Taonui; Line open, station closed 2.98 km (1.85 mi)	North Island Main Trunk; NZR	Terrace End; Line closed, station closed 4 mi 73 ch (7.9 km)
Taonui; Line open, station closed 2.98 km (1.85 mi)	North Island Main Trunk; KiwiRail	Palmerston North; Line open, station open 8.52 km (5.29 mi)
Location

Bunnythorpe railway station was a station on the North Island Main Trunk in New Zealand, serving the village of Bunnythorpe.

The station opened on 19 October 1876 and closed on 6 December 1981 for goods traffic. When closed for passengers on 13 April 1985, the crossing loop was relocated to Taonui.

== History ==
By July 1876 the rails were in place, linking Palmerston North and Feilding, and ballasting was finished in September. The formal opening of the railway was on 19 October 1876.

In 1879 there were plans to link Ashhurst via a 6 1/2 mi (10.5 km) line to Bunnythorpe, rather than Palmerston North. It seems the plan was changed when, in 1881, the Wellington and Manawatu Railway decided on Palmerston North as a terminus. Construction of the link was again considered in 1902.

Initially the name Bunnythorpe was used north of the railway and, to the south, a name popularised from 1866 by Charles Dickens' series of short railway stories, Mugby Junction.

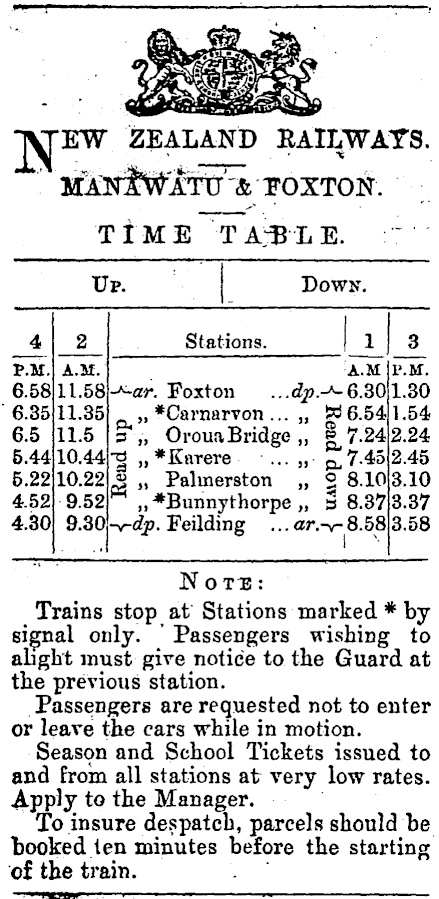
1877 Foxton Feilding railway timetable

Bunnythorpe was served by 2 or 3 trains a day, before becoming a flag station in 1879, served by 3 trains a day. From 1887 there were complaints about how few trains stopped at the station and an extra train stopped from 1894. However, it had stopped calling by 1906. By 1908 there were again 3 trains a day, but complaints of long waits. In 1909 a request for a carriage to be added to the afternoon goods train was rejected. The line became part of the NIMT, when it fully opened in 1909. The Auckland express was stopping in 1924.

By 1884 Bunnythorpe had a shelter shed on a passenger platform. Between 1891 and 1896 a goods shed was added and, in 1902, a loading bank. By 1902 a passing loop could hold 50 wagons and it was extended in 1959. In 1905 the platform was lengthened and a new station building opened. By 1911 there were also sheep yards. Huts were provided for tablet porters in 1919 and 1930. Railway houses were added in 1905, 1954 and 1956. In 1960 CTC signalling was put in between Bunnythorpe and Longburn and extended to Feilding on 23 August 1964. A new station was built in 1956 and, in 1960 and 1964, the goods loading shelter was extended. A concrete block building was added in 1991.

The station was demolished in 1975. By 1969 the sheep yards had been removed and on 6 December 1981 Bunnythorpe closed to all, except private siding traffic.

== Freight hub ==
KiwiRail started the formal planning process in October 2020 for a freight hub, just south of Bunnythorpe. It is planned to include a container terminal, warehousing, bulk goods and forestry loading, train maintenance and cater for trains up to 1.5 km (0.93 mi) long. Public submissions on the scheme were invited in 2021.
