= Terrace End railway station =

Defunct railway station in New Zealand

- Location of Terrace End Station, 1906 (centre)

General information
- Location: Main Street, Palmerston North; New Zealand
- Coordinates: 40°20′48.3″S 175°37′55.9″E
- Line: North Island Main Trunk
- Platforms: 2
- Tracks: 2

Construction
- Structure type: 2 shelters in 1960

History
- Opened: 1879
- Closed: 21 October 1960

Services
Preceding station	Historical railways	Following station
Palmerston North; Line closed 1 mi 56 ch (2.7 km) towards Wellington	North Island Main Trunk; NZR	Bunnythorpe; Line closed 4 mi 73 ch (7.9 km) towards Auckland
Palmerston North; Line closed 1 mi 56 ch (2.7 km)	Palmerston North–Gisborne Line; NZR	Whakarongo; Line closed 2 mi 53 ch (4.3 km) towards Napier
Location

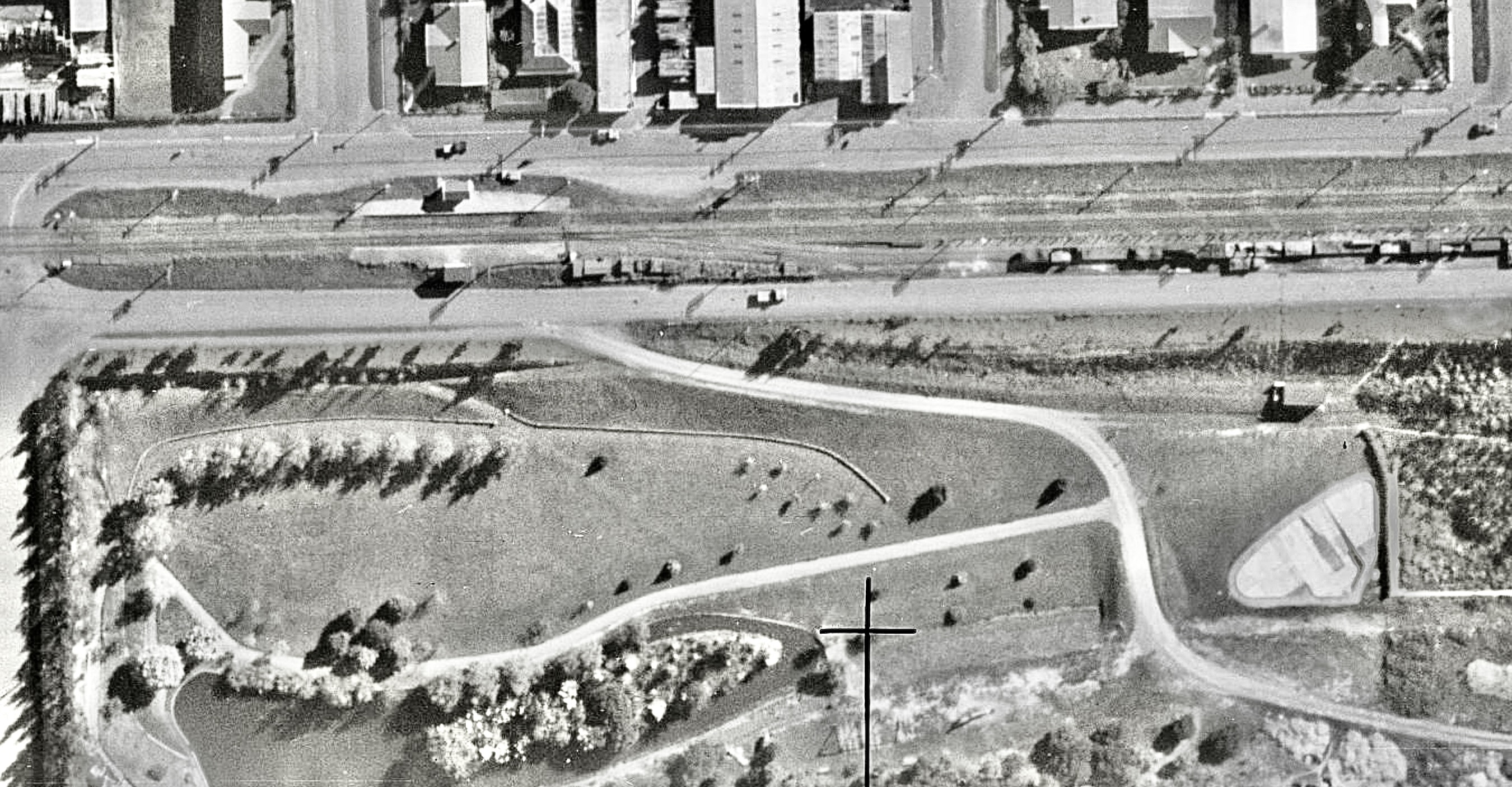
1951 Terrace End

Terrace End railway station was a flag station on the North Island Main Trunk (NIMT) in New Zealand. The station served the northern suburb of Terrace End in Palmerston North. The station was located adjacent to a gravel pit owned by the Railways Department (NZR) for ballast production.

The station was opened in 1879, and closed on 21 October 1960. The station was demolished and railway removed in the early 1960s.

== History ==
By July 1876 the rails were in place, linking Palmerston North and Feilding, and ballasting was finished in September. The formal opening of the railway was on 19 October 1876. A public meeting was held in February 1877 to ask for a station at Terrace End. Another public meeting in July 1878 protested about a proposed site, on 22 August 1878 NZR made a decision and in March 1879 the only delay was the supply of timber. A 24 ft (7.3 m) x 9 ft (2.7 m) shelter shed was added by May.

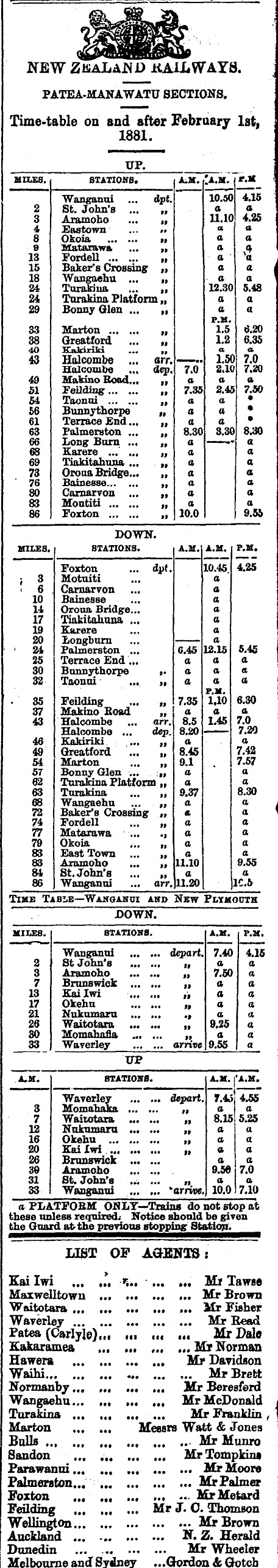
1881 timetable Whanganui-Foxton

In 1881 there were 3 trains a day each way.

On 28 November 1885 NZR bought the adjacent ballast pit from Manawatu Road Board for £400. In 1929 the ballast pit siding was extended to take 26 wagons and Manawatu County Council took a lot of metal from the pit. It was still in use in 1939, though the pit was converted to a lake and Memorial Park in 1937.

In 1889-90 the line between Palmerston and Terrace End was doubled to a little east of Terrace End, where the tracks divided as single lines towards Bunnythorpe, or Whakarongo. In 1890 the road to the south of the railway was formed.

By 1896 there was a shelter shed, platform, cart approach, loading bank and cattle yards and in 1931 it was noted there was a caretaker at the station. The station was damaged when a large storm blew through the city in February 1936, causing a small building to collapse. The station closed on Friday 21 October 1960, though the line to Palmerston North remained open until the Milson route took over all traffic from 6 June 1964 and lifting of the line started on 26 August.
