= The Gorge railway station, New Zealand =

Defunct railway station in New Zealand

The Gorge
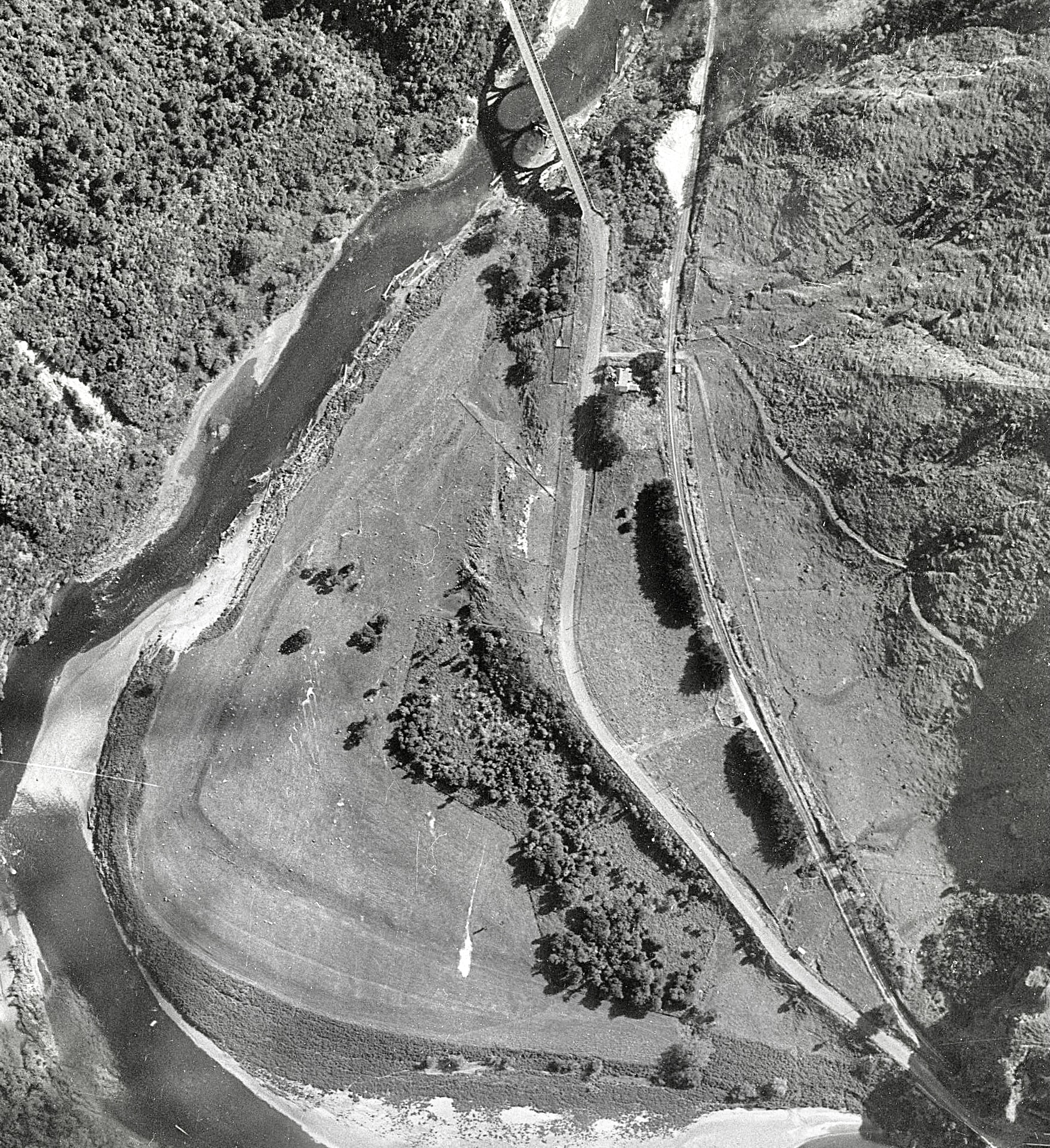
- The Gorge in 1946

General information
- Location: New Zealand
- Coordinates: 40°20′7.44″S 175°49′6.6″E
- Elevation: 82 metres (269 ft)
- System: New Zealand Government Railways (NZGR)
- Line: Palmerston North - Gisborne Line
- Distance: 23.28 kilometres (14.47 mi) from Palmerston North
- Platforms: Single side

Construction
- Structure type: at-grade
- Parking: No

History
- Opened: 2 February 1900
- Closed: 21 October 1965
Location
Notes
- Previous Station: Ashhurst Station; Next Station: Woodville Station

The Gorge railway station on the Palmerston North - Gisborne Line was located in the Tararua District of the Manawatū-Whanganui region in New Zealand’s North Island.

The station opened on 2 February 1900 and closed on 21 October 1965. It is unusual in being one of only six stations whose name begins with the word The.

== Facilities ==
The Gorge station was opened in 1900 as a simple passenger halt at the Woodville entrance to the Manawatū Gorge. The station consisted of a simple passenger platform and shelter on the river side of the railway, alongside a backshunt with capacity for 18 wagons, which was used for service purposes when bridge gangs were working in the Gorge.

The station was the closest railway station to the Ballance community, especially after the nearby Ballance Bridge opened in 1904. By 1910 there was agitation for a railway loop siding to be installed for the dispatch and receiving of goods. This was declined as the view around the station was bad, the likely cost to build it considerable, and the traffic on offer "infinitesimal".

A review in 1936 showed a tablet hut had been established sometime in the proceeding years and at 8.00 am on Wednesday 20 December 1939, the station was closed as a Holiday Switchout Tablet station, but resumed this role on 3 October 1954, with a 66-wagon passing loop.

In 1962 the station was noted as having two loops, with the second loop also having a loading bin. In that year one loop was closed and the second converted into a backshunt operated from the Woodville end of the station. Records state that by 1965 the remaining siding to the Manawatu Gorge Lime Company was closed and by 1967 the remaining tracks had been lifted but aerial photographs show the siding still in place as late as 1981.

=== Limestone ===
The regions on either end of the Manawatū Gorge were farming regions, including dairy. In 1915 the Palmerston North branch of the New Zealand Farmers' Union investigated the possibility of utilising limestone deposits located in the hill above The Gorge station. However, it would be another two decades before the plant was finally built by the Manawatu Gorge Lime Company. To serve this traffic, in 1937 a new loop was installed next to the backshunt, 44 chains (890 m) towards Woodville. Limestone traffic continued for three decades before the rail facilities were reduced in 1962 and closed in about 1966.

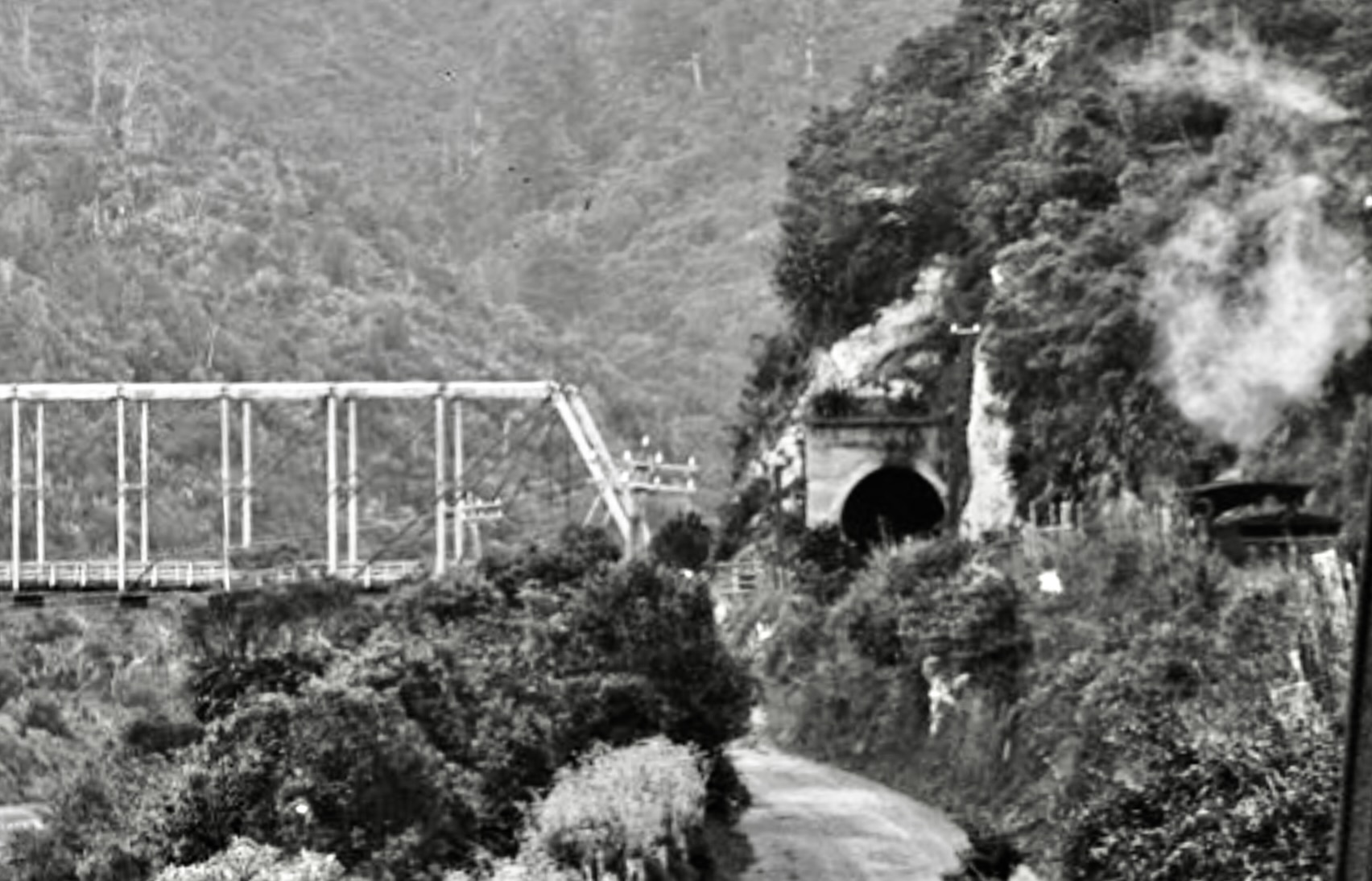
Tunnel 3 and Ballance Bridge

== Tunnels ==
25 chains (500 m) and 19 ch (380 m), concrete-lined, tunnels 1 and 2, in the Gorge, were built for £2115 and £1972 under an 1889 contract. Tunnels 3, 4 and 5, just to the east of the station, were daylighted in 2008 to allow high-cube containers to use the line. Tunnel 3 was the last to be daylighted. The shortest of them was 42.05 m (138.0 ft).

== Te Apiti Station ==
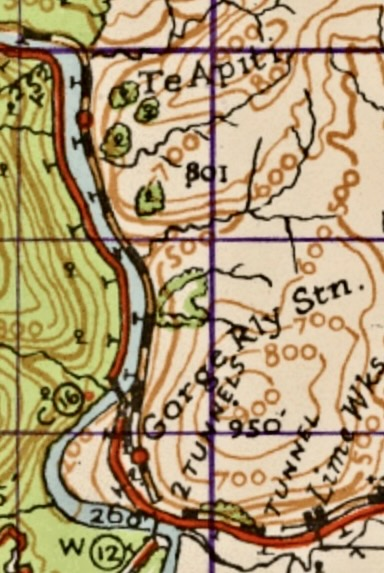
Te Apiti and The Gorge on 1942 map

To improve train-running, a new 54-wagon passing loop in the Manawatu Gorge, 1 mi 16 ch (1.9 km) west of The Gorge, opened on 27 November 1939, roughly halfway between Woodville and Ashhurst railway stations. At 12 noon on Wednesday, 20 December 1939 Te Apiti railway station opened as a Holiday Switchout Tablet station, replacing The Gorge railway station for that purpose.

Te Apiti station was only used for crossing purposes and was guarded by home and distant semaphore signals in both directions. All other traffic continued to use the more accessible gorge station.

Part of an overnight goods train, hauled by K^{A} 951, hit a boulder and fell in the river on 20 August 1946. Some reports said it was near Te Apiti, though another said it only had about 50 yards to go to be clear of the danger of slips. The driver was found north of Himatangi Beach. The fireman was never found.

In November 1954 the crossing loop was closed and all infrastructure was removed. The role of switchout tablet station returned to The Gorge.

Te Apiti Station Coordinates: 40°19′8.1588″S 175°48′59.2344″E
