= Bunnythorpe =

Settlement in Manawatū-Whanganui Region, New Zealand

- village
- Interactive map of Bunnythorpe
- Coordinates: 40°17′S 175°38′E
- Country: New Zealand
- Region: Manawatū-Whanganui region
- Territorial authority: Palmerston North City
- Ward: Te Hirawanui General Ward; Te Pūao Māori Ward
- Named for: Henry Bunny
- Electorates: Palmerston North; Te Tai Hauāuru (Māori)

Government
  - Territorial Authority: Palmerston North City Council
  - Regional council: Horizons Regional Council
  - Mayor of Palmerston North: Grant Smith
  - Palmerston North MP: Tangi Utikere
  - Te Tai Hauāuru MP: Debbie Ngarewa-Packer

Area
  - Total: 4.26 km^{2} (1.64 sq mi)

Population (June 2025)
  - Total: 740
  - Density: 170/km^{2} (450/sq mi)
- Area Code: 06

Bunnythorpe is a village in the Manawatū-Whanganui region of New Zealand's North Island, 10 km (6 mi) north of the region's major city, Palmerston North. Dairy farms predominate the surrounding area but the community facilities include Bunnythorpe School, with a roll of about 80 pupils as of 2010, as well as a rugby football club, country club and several manufacturing plants. The population was estimated to be 740 as of June 2025.

== History ==
The North Island Main Trunk Railway passed over government owned land, which was subdivided and later became Bunnythorpe. The village takes its name from Henry Bunny, the Secretary-Treasurer of the Wellington Provincial Council, which functioned from 1853 to 1876.

On the other side of the rail line, the town of Mugby Junction was to be established. It was proposed in 1878, that the link between the North Island Main Trunk and the Napier line would be here. However plans changed and the junction was located at Palmerston North. The building of Mugby Junction never eventuated.

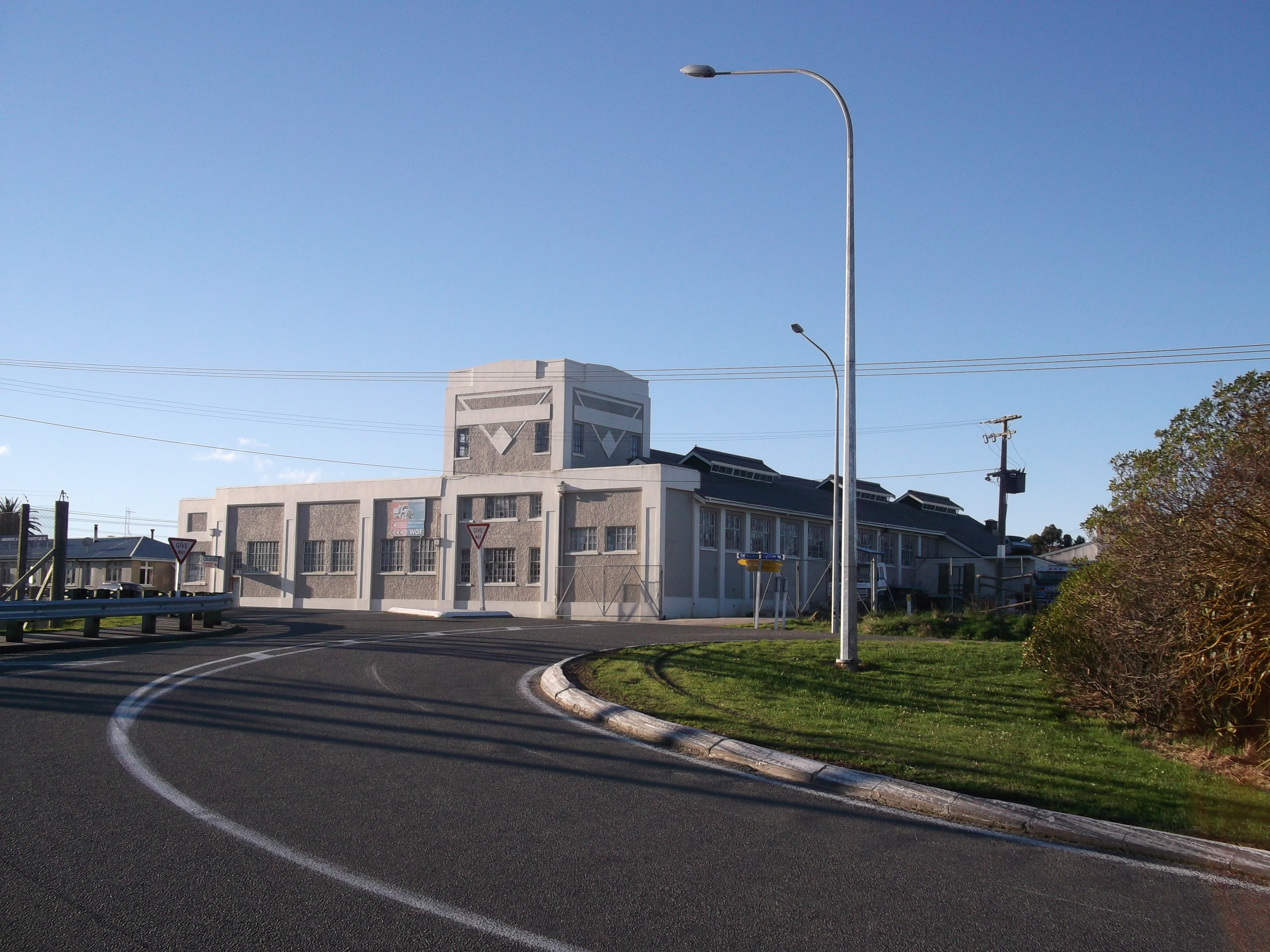
The historic Glaxo factory

The Glaxo company was founded in Bunnythorpe. In 1904 Joseph Nathan and Sons established a baby-food manufacturer which processed local milk into a baby food named Glaxo (sold in the 1930s under the slogan Glaxo builds bonny babies). As of 2010, still visible on the main street of Bunnythorpe is the factory for drying and processing cows' milk into powder, with the original Glaxo logo clearly visible, but nothing to indicate the birthplace of a major multinational. Products were made in Bunnythorpe until 1973. As of 2010 the building is commercially owned.

The Glaxo company became a major pharmaceutical manufacturer and after a series of mergers it became part of the United Kingdom's GlaxoSmithKline in 2000. In 1979 the Glaxo factory was transformed into the Pantha BMX manufacturing plant, which was the first BMX plant in New Zealand and also the home of the first BMX track.

The Bunnythorpe electrical substation was established in 1924, with the electricity transmitted from Mangahao Power Station stepped down to supply the Palmerston North Municipal Electricity Department and the Manawatu-Oroua Electric Power Board. It shortly afterwards became a major switching point, with transmission lines extending from Bunnythorpe to Napier-Hastings, Whanganui, and Masterton. Today, the substation is owned by national grid operator Transpower, and continues to be the main switching point for the lower-central North Island.

== Geography ==
Bunnythorpe is about midway between the Manawatū region's main city of Palmerston North and its second largest settlement, Feilding. To the east of the village lies Ashhurst, and Kairanga sits to the west. Bunnythorpe is part of the Manawatu Plains and is on relatively flat land, with few rolling hills in surrounding farming properties. Several small streams run through the town: the Mangaone Stream and Jack's Creek run parallel towards the south-west through Palmerston North. Several smaller waterways merge with these streams, passing through Bunnythorpe's south.

== Demographics ==
Bunnythorpe is described by Stats NZ as a rural settlement. It covers 4.26 km^{2} (1.64 sq mi) and had an estimated population of 740 as of June 2025, with a population density of 174 people per km^{2}. It is part of the larger Newbury statistical area.

Historical population
Year	Pop.	±% p.a.
2006	645	—
2013	675	+0.65%
2018	684	+0.27%
2023	726	+1.20%

Bunnythorpe had a population of 726 in the 2023 New Zealand census, an increase of 42 people (6.1%) since the 2018 census, and an increase of 51 people (7.6%) since the 2013 census. There were 372 males, 345 females, and 3 people of other genders in 270 dwellings. 2.5% of people identified as LGBTIQ+. The median age was 40.4 years (compared with 38.1 years nationally). There were 144 people (19.8%) aged under 15 years, 111 (15.3%) aged 15 to 29, 360 (49.6%) aged 30 to 64, and 111 (15.3%) aged 65 or older.

People could identify as more than one ethnicity. The results were 90.1% European (Pākehā); 20.2% Māori; 2.9% Pasifika; 4.5% Asian; 0.4% Middle Eastern, Latin American and African New Zealanders (MELAA); and 3.3% other, which includes people giving their ethnicity as "New Zealander". English was spoken by 97.5%, Māori by 2.5%, Samoan by 0.4%, and other languages by 5.0%. No language could be spoken by 2.5% (e.g. too young to talk). New Zealand Sign Language was known by 1.2%. The percentage of people born overseas was 8.3, compared with 28.8% nationally.

Religious affiliations were 25.6% Christian, 0.8% Hindu, 0.4% Islam, 0.4% Māori religious beliefs, 0.8% Buddhist, 0.4% New Age, 0.4% Jewish, and 0.4% other religions. People who answered that they had no religion were 65.7%, and 5.0% of people did not answer the census question.

Of those at least 15 years old, 81 (13.9%) people had a bachelor's or higher degree, 327 (56.2%) had a post-high school certificate or diploma, and 168 (28.9%) people exclusively held high school qualifications. The median income was $46,700, compared with $41,500 nationally. 51 people (8.8%) earned over $100,000 compared to 12.1% nationally. The employment status of those at least 15 was 318 (54.6%) full-time, 87 (14.9%) part-time, and 15 (2.6%) unemployed.

== Climate ==
Bunnythorpe has a very similar temperate climate to Palmerston North, but temperatures tend to be slightly lower in winter and can be significantly lower during the summer months of December to February. The average summer temperature is 20.6 C and the average temperature during the coldest months of June–August is 11.2 C.

== Parks and recreation ==
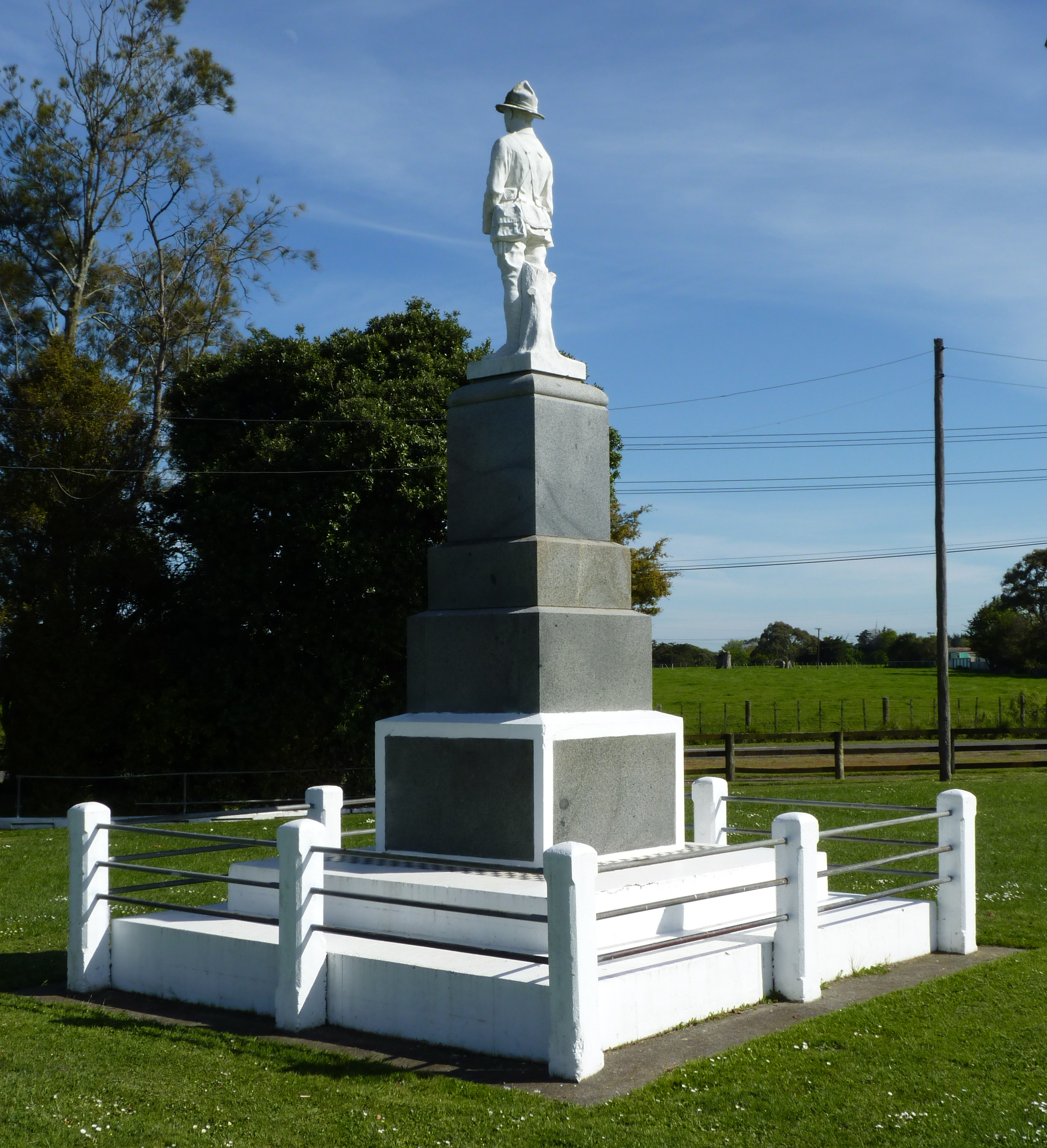
World War II memorial

Bunnythorpe is popular among younger children as it is a small community and regarded as quite safe. Children often spend weekends and spare time utilising the open access to the primary school's playgrounds and sporting fields. There is also a Rugby Football Club on Raymond St with clubrooms and this is the site of the ANZAC memorial Cenotaph. The Mangaone Stream bridge off Maple Street on Te Ngaio Road is also popular among the children, with eels and fresh water trout among the catch.

== Transport ==
=== Road ===
The main access to Bunnythorpe comes via Railway Road from Palmerston North and Wellington in the south; Ashhurst-Bunnythorpe Road from Ashhurst, Woodville and Hawke’s Bay in the east; Kairanga Bunnythorpe Road from the west; and Campbell Road to the north, serving Feilding.

=== Air ===
Bunnythorpe is less than 10 minutes' drive from Palmerston North Airport in Milson, where regular flights to Auckland, Wellington, Hamilton, Christchurch and Nelson are available.

=== Rail ===
The North Island Main Trunk Railway runs through the centre of Bunnythorpe but trains no longer stop in the village, as the station was closed in 1985. Freight and passenger trains run from between Wellington and Auckland, though passengers must board these services in Palmerston North.

=== Bus ===
A service operates between Feilding and Palmerston North hourly, which stops in Bunnythorpe. The main stop in Palmerston North is Main Street which is also the main Palmerston North suburban bus terminus, where buses can be caught to other suburbs. Inter-City buses depart from Palmerston North.

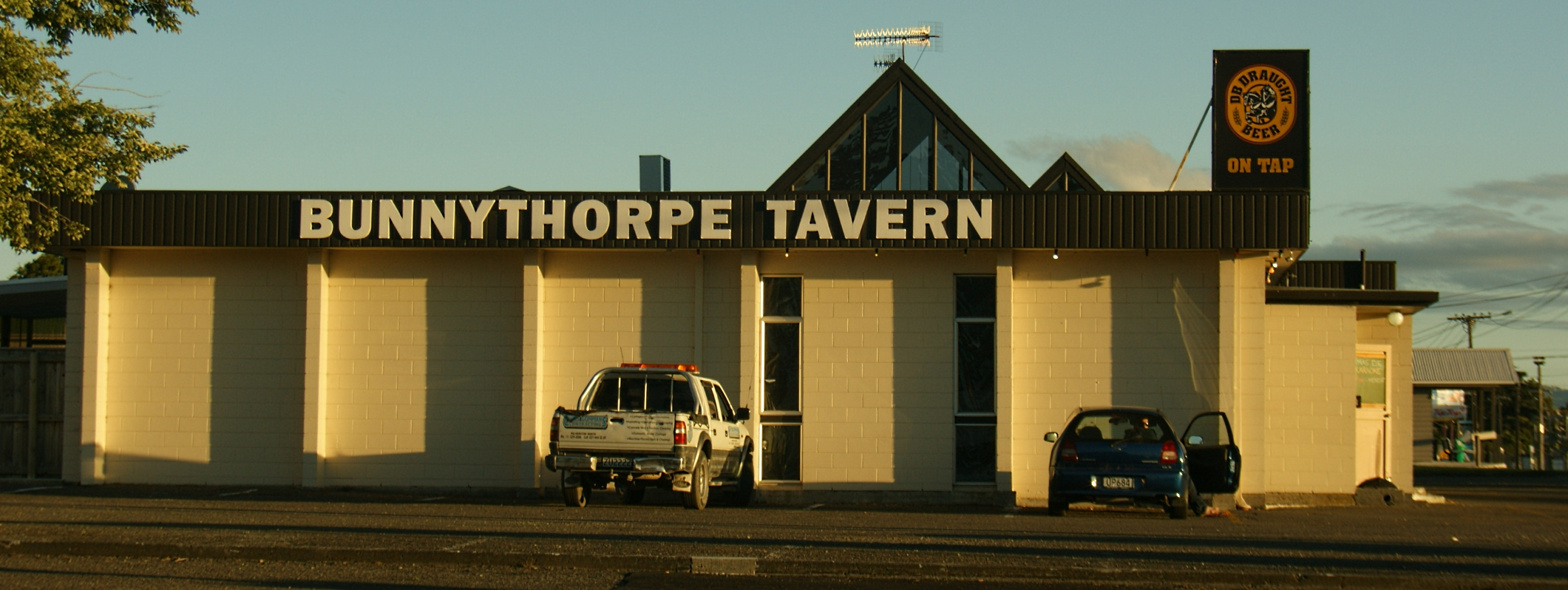
Local watering hole, the Bunnythorpe Tavern

== Government ==
=== Local ===
Bunnythorpe is within the Palmerston North City territorial authority. It was formerly part of the Manawatu District, but was moved in 2012 along with other areas. This was done to allow development of city housing and industrial land while avoiding problems with cross-boundary infrastructure.

=== Central ===
Bunnythorpe is represented in the Rangitīkei electorate by Suze Redmayne of the New Zealand National Party.

Bunnythorpe is represented in the Te Tai Hauāuru Māori electorate by Debbie Ngarewa-Packer of Te Pāti Māori.

== Education ==
Bunnythorpe School is a co-educational state primary school for Year 1 to 8 students, with a roll of 29 as of July 2026. It opened in 1883.
