= Taonui railway station =

Defunct railway station in New Zealand

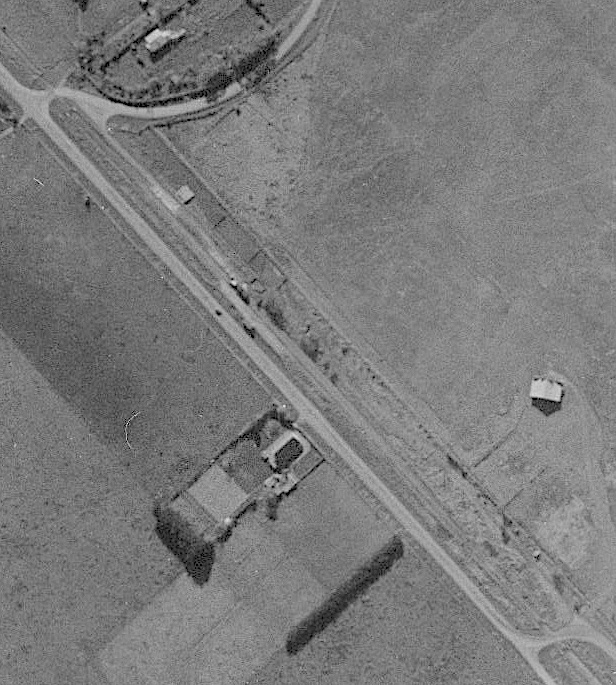
- Taonui in 1949

General information
- Location: New Zealand
- Coordinates: 40.255527°S 175.598977°E
- Elevation: 62 m (203 ft)
- Owner: KiwiRail
- Line: North Island Main Trunk
- Distance: Wellington 150.9 km (93.8 mi)
- Platforms: 1

History
- Opened: 20 November 1879
- Closed: 10 August 1959
- Electrified: 25 kV 50 Hz AC June 1988

Services
Preceding station	Historical railways	Following station
Aorangi; Line open, station closed 3.17 km (1.97 mi)	North Island Main Trunk; KiwiRail	Bunnythorpe; Line open, station closed 2.98 km (1.85 mi)
Location

Taonui railway station was a station on the North Island Main Trunk and in the Manawatū-Whanganui region of New Zealand. From 1879 to 1886 it was the junction for the Taonui Branch. A passing loop remains at the station site.

It opened in 1876 and closed in 1959. Te Araroa long-distance walkway passes the station site.

Feilding Aerodrome is to the northeast of the station and Taonui School to the southwest.

== History ==
By July 1876 the rails were in place, linking Palmerston North and Feilding, and ballasting was finished in September. The formal opening of the railway was on 19 October 1876. It wasn't until 12 April 1879 that authority was requested for a platform at Taonui, though Bailey's Mill was mentioned as being at Taonui Siding on 13 May 1879. The station probably opened when the Taonui Branch was ready for opening on 20 November 1879.

Initially passengers had to wait at Taonui if the locomotive had to collect freight from the branch. That ended some time after 31 March 1880, when horses took over on the branch. The branch closed in 1895. Taonui was described as a flag station in 1882 and it first appeared in a timetable in 1883, but there was a request for Taonui to become a regular stop for passengers in 1888. By 1896 it had a shelter shed, passenger platform, cart approach, loading bank, cattle yards and a passing loop for 68 wagons.

The railway was cut through thick bush, which was then cut by several sawmills, including that of Bailey Brothers, who had a private siding from 1878 until 1894. After that timber traffic ended, the railway began to carry livestock from the new farms. In 1937 Aorangi and Taonui sent 30,255 sheep and pigs by train.

=== Closure ===
A report on 19 June 1959 said there was a shelter shed, platform and sheep yards, but no passenger, parcels, or small lots goods traffic, and only 6 wagons of sheep in the last year. The station closed to all traffic on 10 August 1959, though another notice said it closed on 14 April 1963.

After closure the shelter shed was moved to a nearby farmer's paddock. A few decades later, the farmer donated it to the Feilding and District Steam Rail Society, who restored it to be part of its depot in Feilding. The restoration work gained a Certificate of Merit from the Rail Heritage Trust of New Zealand in 2002.

== Trondjiem ==
About 95 ch (6,300 ft; 1,900 m) towards Bunnythorpe, Richter Nannestead & Co had a siding at Trondjiem from 1878 to 1888. Another 70 ch (4,600 ft; 1,400 m) further on McChesney & Beard had a siding from 1878 to 1885, when it was proposed to close Trondjiem flag station, though it was noted the next year that trains would stop at Trondjiem for goods traffic only. McChesney & Beard's Bunnythorpe Steam Sawmill and short tramway were offered for sale in 1879.
