= Mangaone Stream =

Stream near Palmerston North, New Zealand

Coordinates: 40.386°S 175.571°E

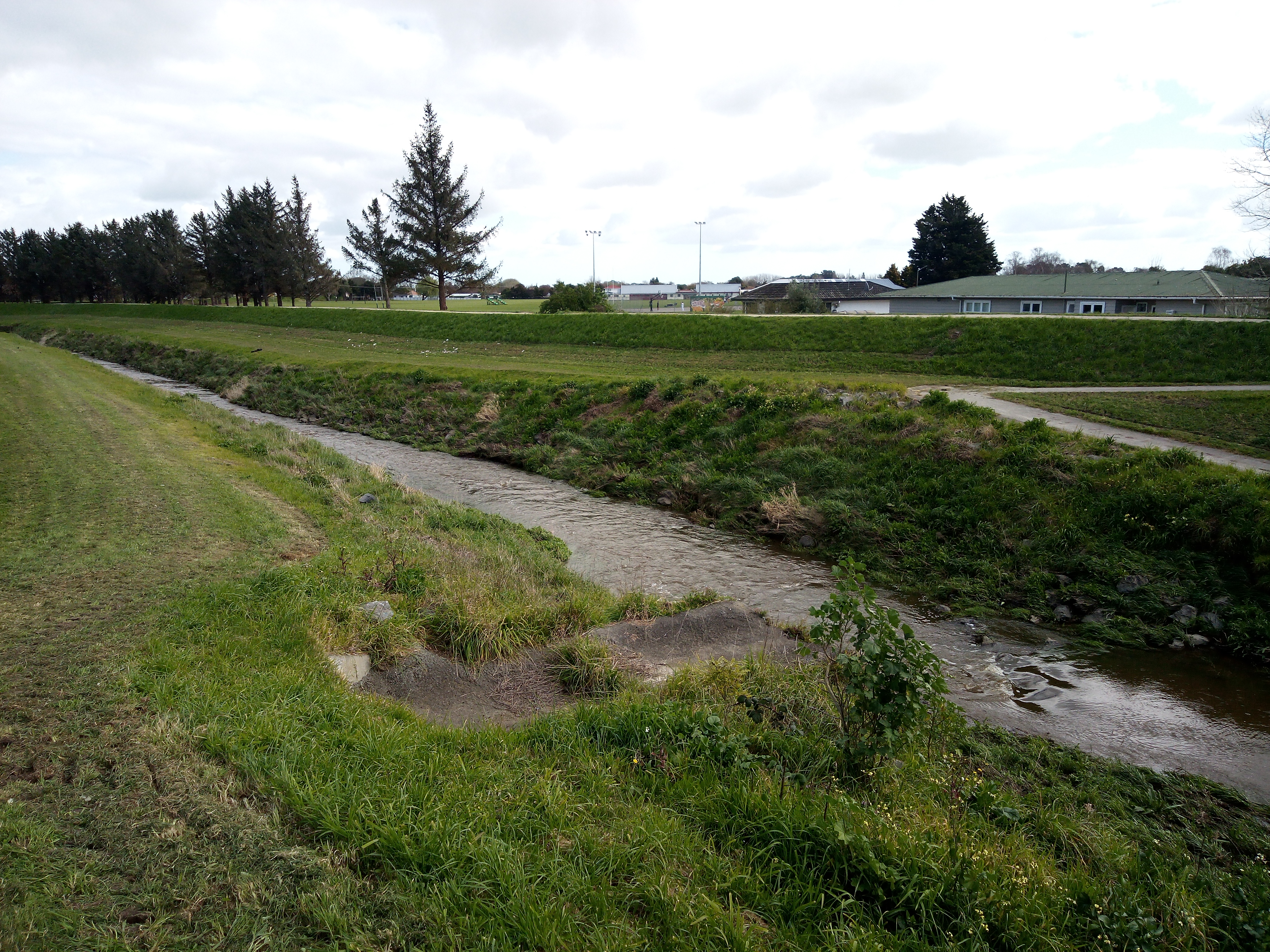
Mangaone Stream, Palmerston North, looking west from Highbury Avenue.

The Mangaone Stream is a small watercourse in Palmerston North, New Zealand.

The stream has its headwaters near Pohangina, and flows south-west across the Manawatū Plains and through Bunnythorpe and the northern and western parts of Palmerston North, including the suburbs of Milson, Cloverlea, and Westbrook, Palmerston North before joining the Manawatū River on the western outskirts of Awapuni. Within the city it is fed by the Kawau Stream. The total catchment is 165 square kilometres.

In 2018 the stream was discovered to have been contaminated by PFOS from firefighting foams used at Palmerston North Airport.

From 2019 to 2022 the stream was one of the targets of the Palmy's Plastic Pollution Challenge citizen science project.

== Flooding ==
The stream regularly flooded in the early years of Palmerston North. It was straightened and deepend in 1907 in an effort to limit flooding, but floods continued.

The stream overflowed its stopbanks in 1988, causing significant flooding in Palmerston North. The flood led to a significant upgrade to the city's flood defences. As of 2014 the stream was stopbanked for almost its entire length within the city, with only a short section near its confluence with the Manawatū River unprotected. The stopbanks were further upgraded in 2022 and 2024.

== Recreational use ==
The stream passes through a number of parks in Palmerston North, including Bill Brown Park in Westbrook and Rangitane Park in Awapuni. The entire length of the stream within Palmerston North is part of the Mangaone Stream Shared Pathway.
