= Awapuni railway station =

Defunct railway station in New Zealand

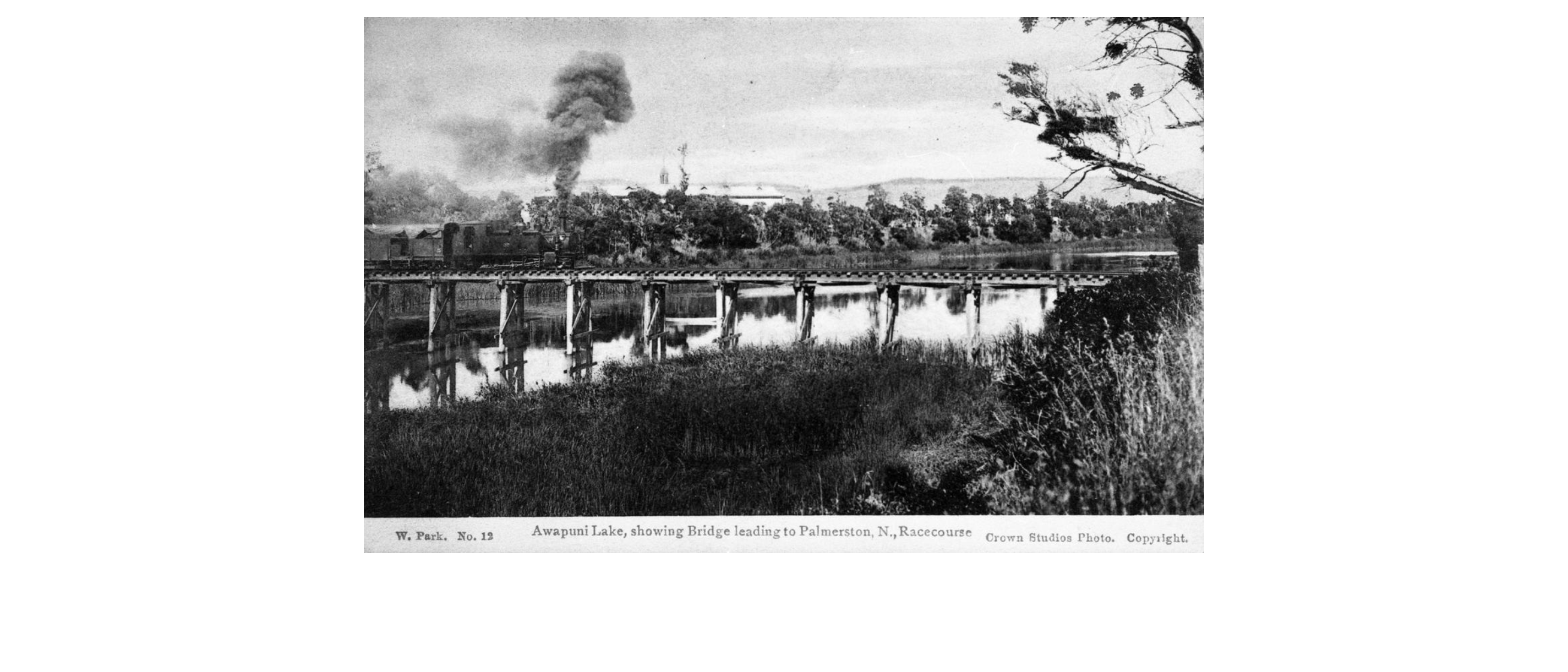
- Bridge over Awapuni Lagoon about 1910 on the racecourse siding

General information
- Location: New Zealand
- Coordinates: 40.372979°S 175.573472°E
- Elevation: 25 m (82 ft)
- Line: North Island Main Trunk
- Distance: Wellington 84 mi 79 ch (136.8 km)

History
- Opened: 26 July 1873
- Closed: 20 July 1959

Services
Preceding station	Historical railways	Following station
Palmerston North; Line closed 2 mi 73 ch (4.7 km)	North Island Main Trunk; NZR	Longburn; Line closed 1 mi 8 ch (1.8 km)
Location

Awapuni railway station was a station in Kairanga County, on the Foxton Branch and, from 1908, the North Island Main Trunk in New Zealand, now in the Palmerston North suburb of Awapuni. It was beside the Mangaone Stream, near its confluence with the Kawau Stream, about 400 m (440 yd) west of Maxwells Line on the north side of Pioneer Highway. Nothing remains of the former station, except a wide verge, partly occupied by a cycleway, built in 2015.

== History ==
Awa Puni station opened on the Foxton tramway on 26 July 1873, 21 mi 6 ch (33.9 km) from Foxton.

A Māori petition for a platform at 3 Mile Bush on the Foxton Branch was presented on 7 August 1876. The Māori settlement at Awapuni was near the railway, with a population of 71 in 1881.

The station reopened with conversion of the wooden tramway to a railway on 20 October 1876, though Awapuni wasn't shown in the timetable when services through to Whanganui began in 1878. A platform was mentioned in 1879. By 1884 it had a shelter shed, platform and cart approach. The platform was too short for Wellington trains, leading to complaints that some coaches stopped over the stream bridge.

Along with other Foxton Branch stations, Awapuni closed on 20 July 1959, shortly after opening of the Milson Deviation on 27 July 1959. The line through Awapuni remained in use until 21 October 1960.

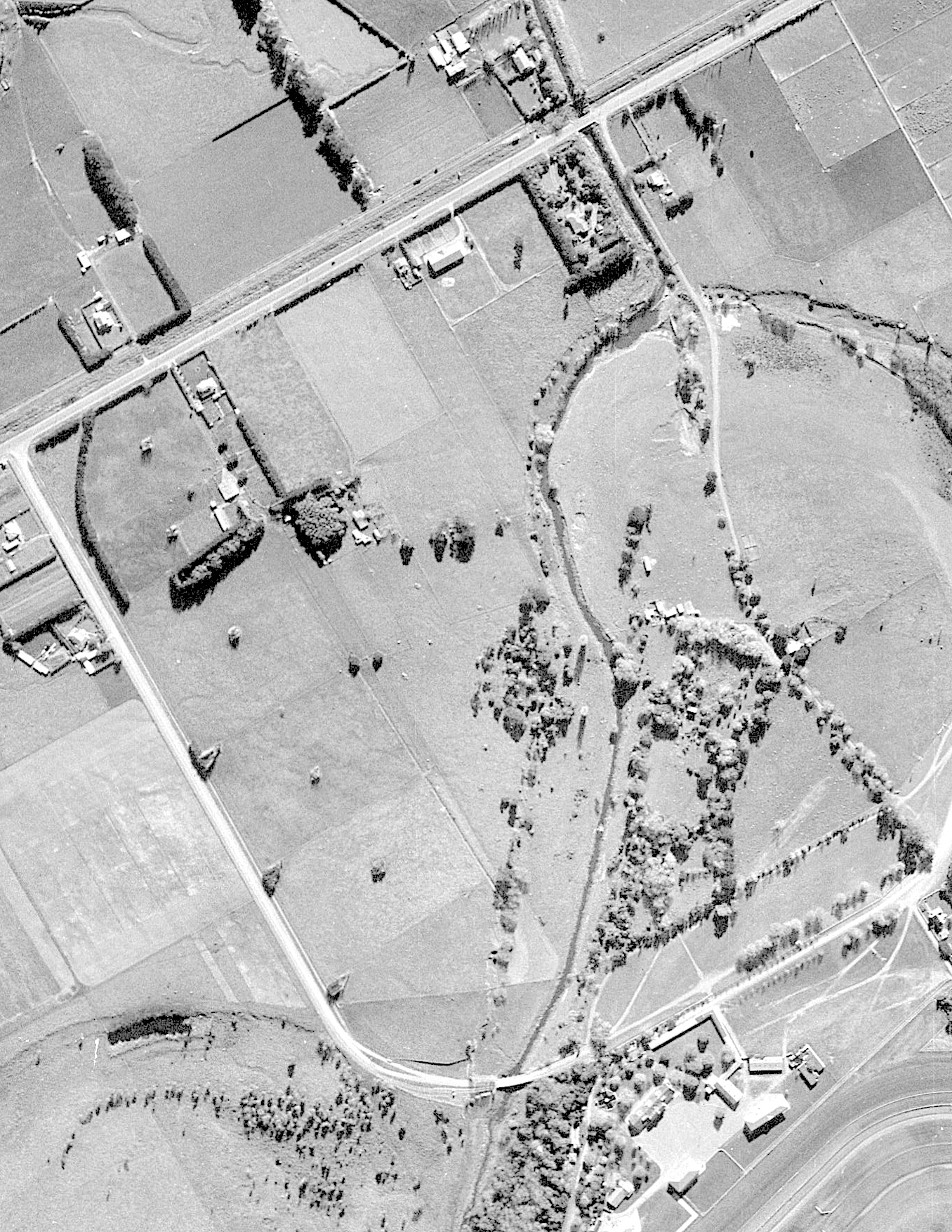
Awapuni in 1949. The railway station is west of the stream at the top. The racecourse is in the bottom right of the photo

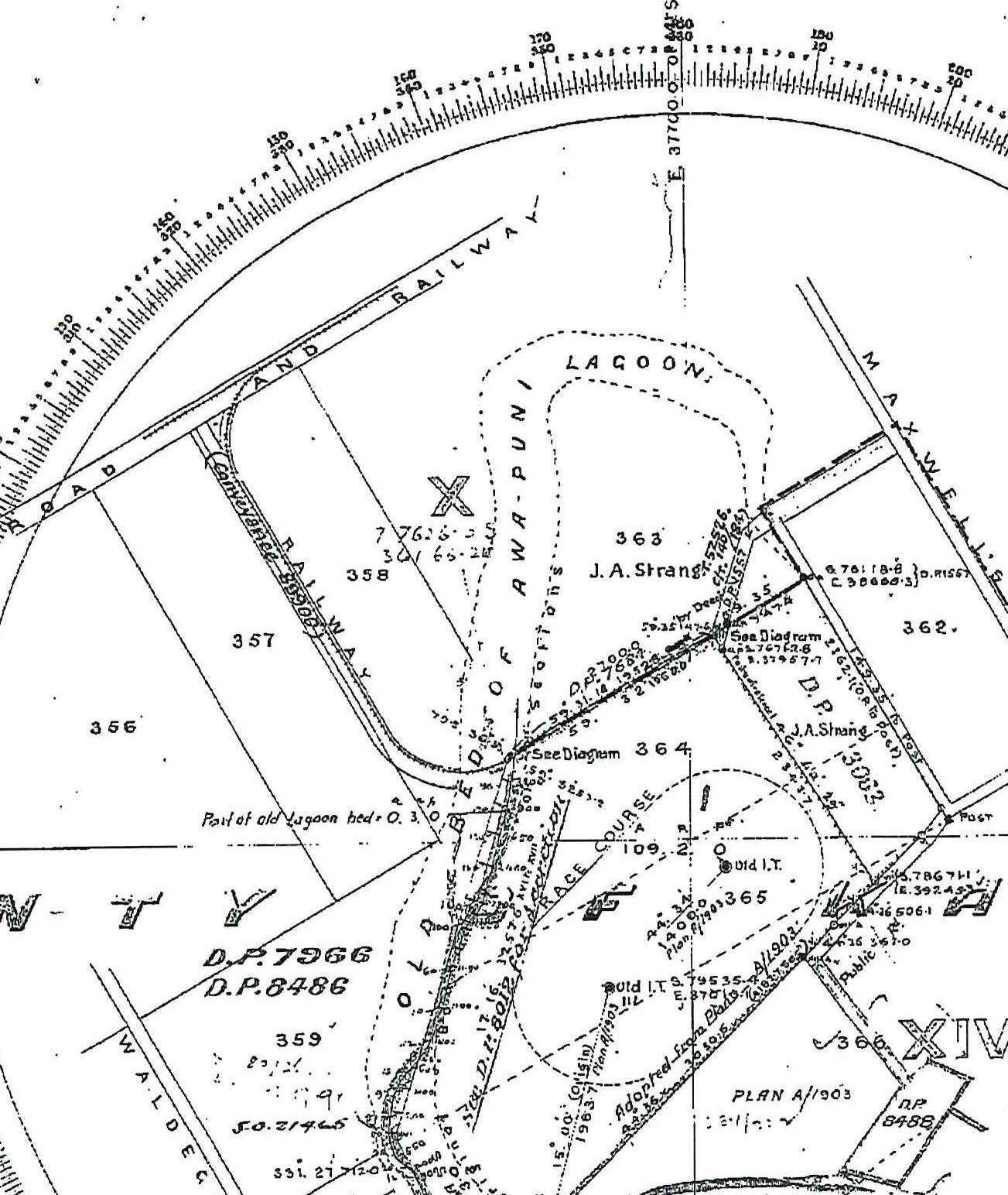
Racecourse branch on 1913 plan

=== Racecourse siding ===
Awa Puni Racecourse station opened on 24 December 1904 and closed on 31 October 1939. Manawatu Racing Club's course opened in 1903, with a private road to the station. In 1903 a private siding to the course was estimated to cost £2,800. The club agreed to it in 1904 and it was completed by the end of that year to allow passenger and goods trains to serve the course, though without a platform. On race days trains stopped at the main station, or ran along the siding to serve race-goers.

By December 1911, 52 wagons could be held on the siding. In 1909 race trains served Foxton, Sanson, Feilding and Paekakariki. 2,734 travelled by train to the course in 1929/30. During 1938 races there were four trains a day from Palmerston and one from Wellington. In 1939, after NZR had decided the bridge was too weak for trains, the track was converted to a road.

The racecourse and drainage board both reduced the size of the lagoon in the 1930s.
