= Whakarongo railway station =

Former railway station in New Zealand

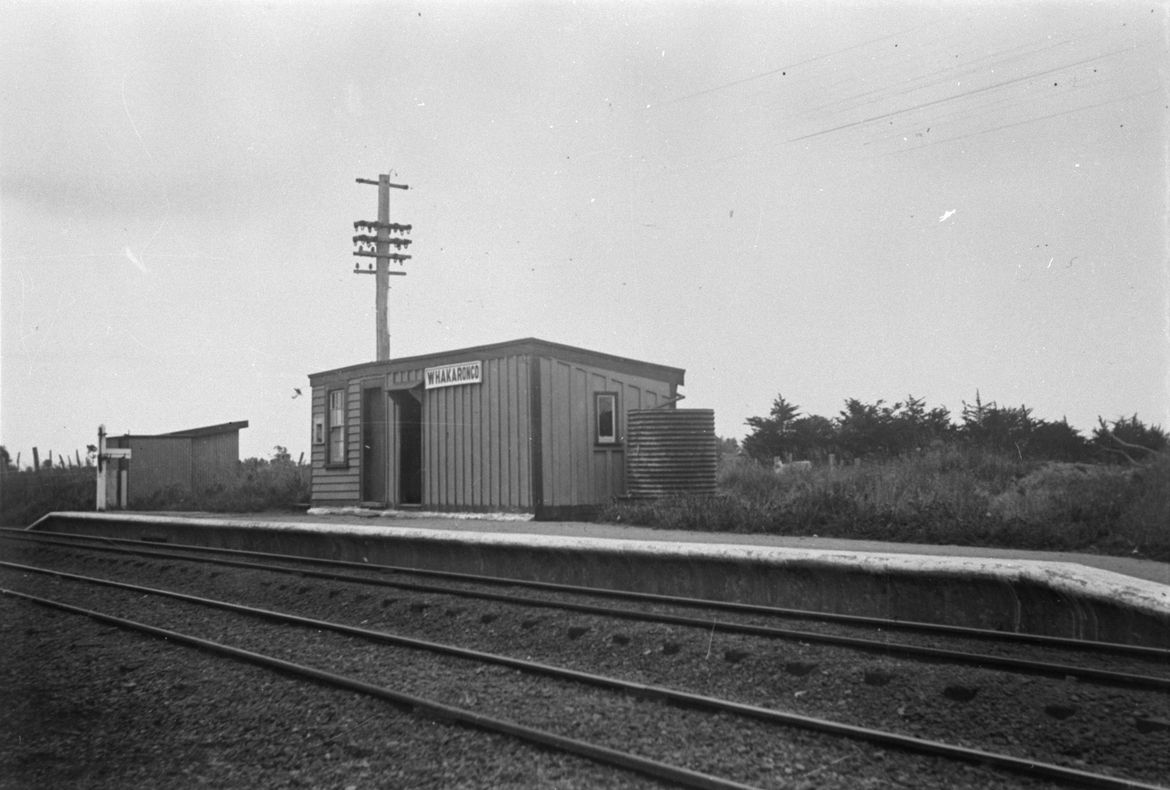
- Whakarongo station in 1941.

General information
- Location: New Zealand
- Coordinates: 40.324172°S 175.673731°E
- Elevation: 56 m (184 ft)
- Line: Palmerston North–Gisborne Line
- Platforms: 1
- Tracks: 1

Construction
- Platform levels: 1
- Parking: No
- Cycle facilities: No

History
- Opened: 9 March 1891
- Closed: 1967
Location
Notes
- Previous Station (original): Terrace End Station; Previous Station (current): Palmerston North Station; Next Station: Ashhurst Station

The Whakarongo Railway Station was a passenger rail station on the Palmerston North to Gisborne line, in the suburb of Whakarongo in the north of Palmerston North. The station was situated between the Terrace End Station and Ashhurst Station.

The station opened on 9 March 1891. It closed to passengers in the 1960s and was demolished in 1967 likely due to the opening of the new Palmerston North Railway Station. An adjacent goods-yard was uplifted in the 1980s, with closure to all traffic on 30 October 1983. Only a single track through the station site now remains.

== History ==
When, to avoid confusion with other places, the name was changed from Stoney Creek on 11 July 1890, there were variants of the new name. Whakaronga appeared in several parliamentary reports, Wahakaronga in one newspaper and Whahakamanga in another.

It had a shelter shed, a passenger platform with a cart approach and a passing loop for 16 wagons. In 1899 it was noted that there were portable hurdles and a gangway for loading stock.

Whakarongo was 107 miles 40 chains 107 mi 40 ch (173.0 km) from Napier and 4 mi 29 ch (7.0 km) from Palmerston North, until the Milson deviation opened on 21 October 1963. It is now 6.07 km (3.77 mi) from Milson Junction, which is 2.48 km (1.54 mi) from the new Palmerston North station. It was 7.31 km (4.54 mi) west of Ashhurst.

A railway deviation, known as the Whakarongo Deviation, between Milson and the station was originally planned in the 1920s. Work was begun but was stopped for World War Two and the track uplifted. This deviation followed along McLeavey Drive, and now borders the Kelvin Grove Cemetery and Linklater reserve. It would have been 2 mi 11 ch (3.4 km) via the Whakarongo deviation. The deviation was estimated to cost £50,000.

The Railways Department built workers' cottages nearby to serve the yard and station.

Preceding station	Historical railways	Following station
Terrace End; Line and station closed	Palmerston North to Gisborne line New Zealand Railways Department	Ashhurst; Line open, station closed
