= Palmerston North Central railway station =

Defunct railway station in New Zealand

Coordinates: 40°21′34.44″S 175°36′17.85″E

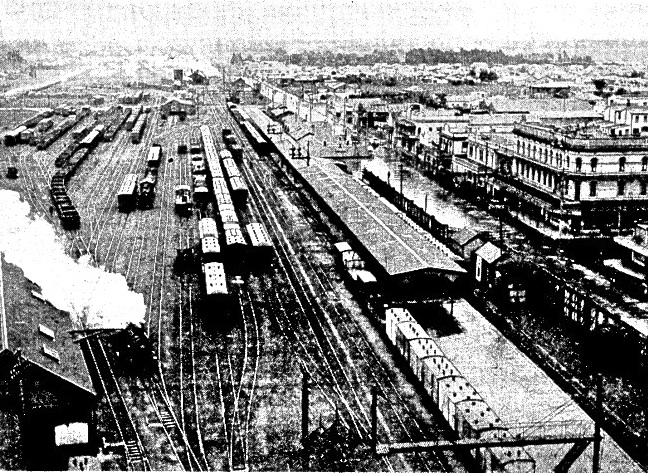
- Railway station and yards in 1934

General information
- Location: The Square, Palmerston North; New Zealand
- Line: North Island Main Trunk
- Platforms: 4
- Tracks: 3
- Connections: Palmerston North–Gisborne Line and Foxton Branch

History
- Opened: 20 October 1876
- Closed: 21 October 1963
Location
Notes
- Previous Station: Awapuni Station; Next Station: Terrace End Station

Palmerston North Central railway station was a station on the North Island Main Trunk in New Zealand and the Palmerston North–Gisborne Line. The station opened in October 1876 and closed in October 1963.

== History ==
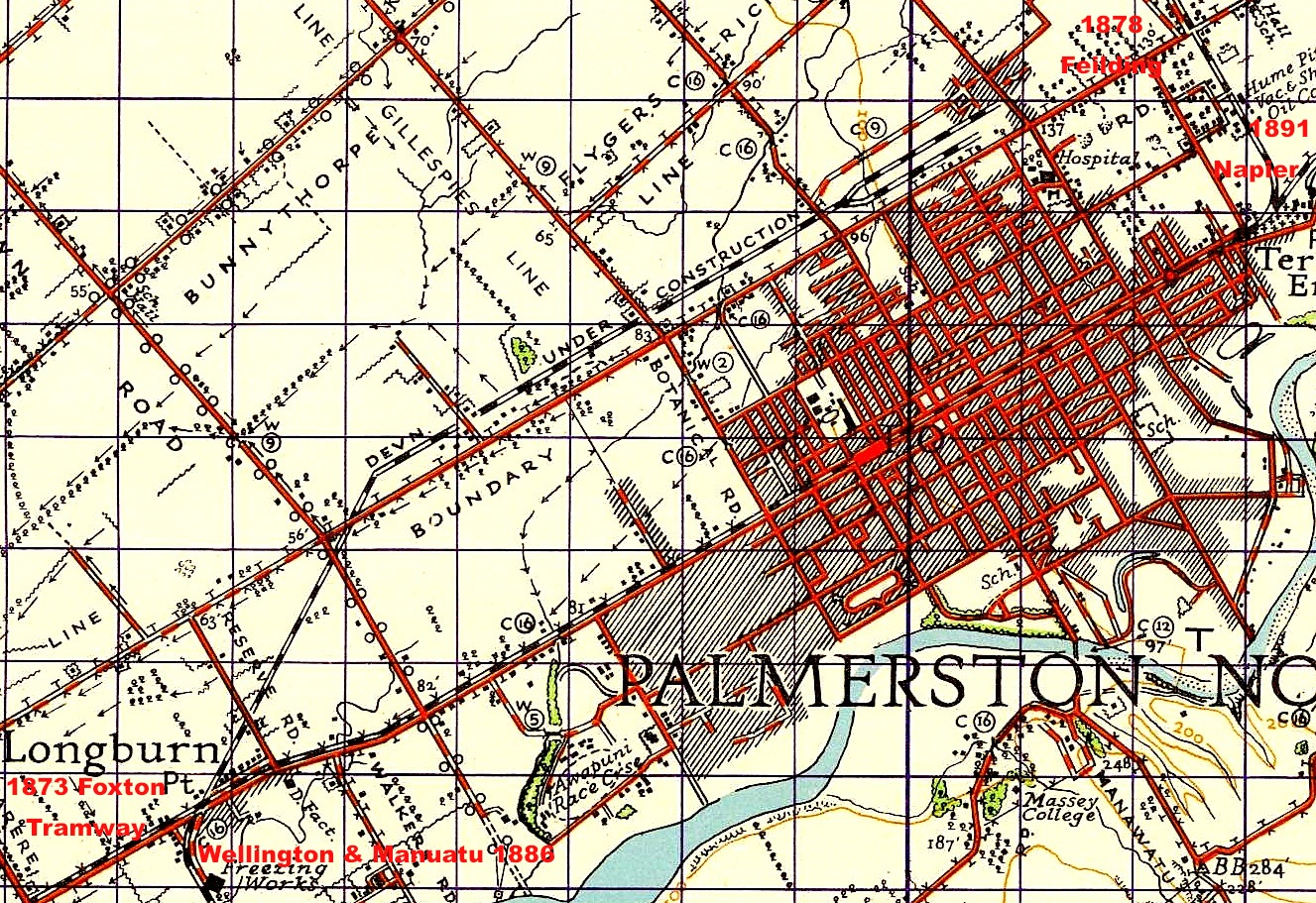
Dates of opening of railway lines – based on 1942 map sourced from 1 inch sheet N149

The original station was opened on 20 October 1876, when the Foxton Tramway was reopened as the Foxton Branch, though from 25 July 1873 the Square had been the terminus for the tramway. In 1883 the Wellington–Manawatu Line south to Wellington opened, increasing traffic. The line was constructed from Wellington to Longburn by the private Wellington and Manawatu Railway Company (W&MR), and initially trains terminated at Longburn, forcing passengers to change trains to NZR services to Palmerston North. Eventually, NZR and W&MR finalised an interchange agreement, allowing W&MR passenger and mail trains to terminate at Palmerston North Central station. A special dock platform at the south of the station was constructed for W&MR trains to Wellington.

Traffic increased with the opening of the line to Napier via Woodville in 1891, and the station was moved 30 chains (2,000 ft; 600 m) south in March 1891. But it was still a bottleneck and remained the longest-persisting bottleneck on the Main Trunk until replaced by the new Palmerston North railway station on the Milson Deviation on 21 October 1963. Following the completion of the North Island Main Trunk in 1908, the government acquired the Wellington and Manawatu Railway Company, and the first Auckland - Wellington through expresses ran on 14 February 1909, taking 19 hours 13 minutes, and stopping at Palmerston North.
