= Ashhurst railway station =

Defunct railway station in New Zealand

Ashhurst
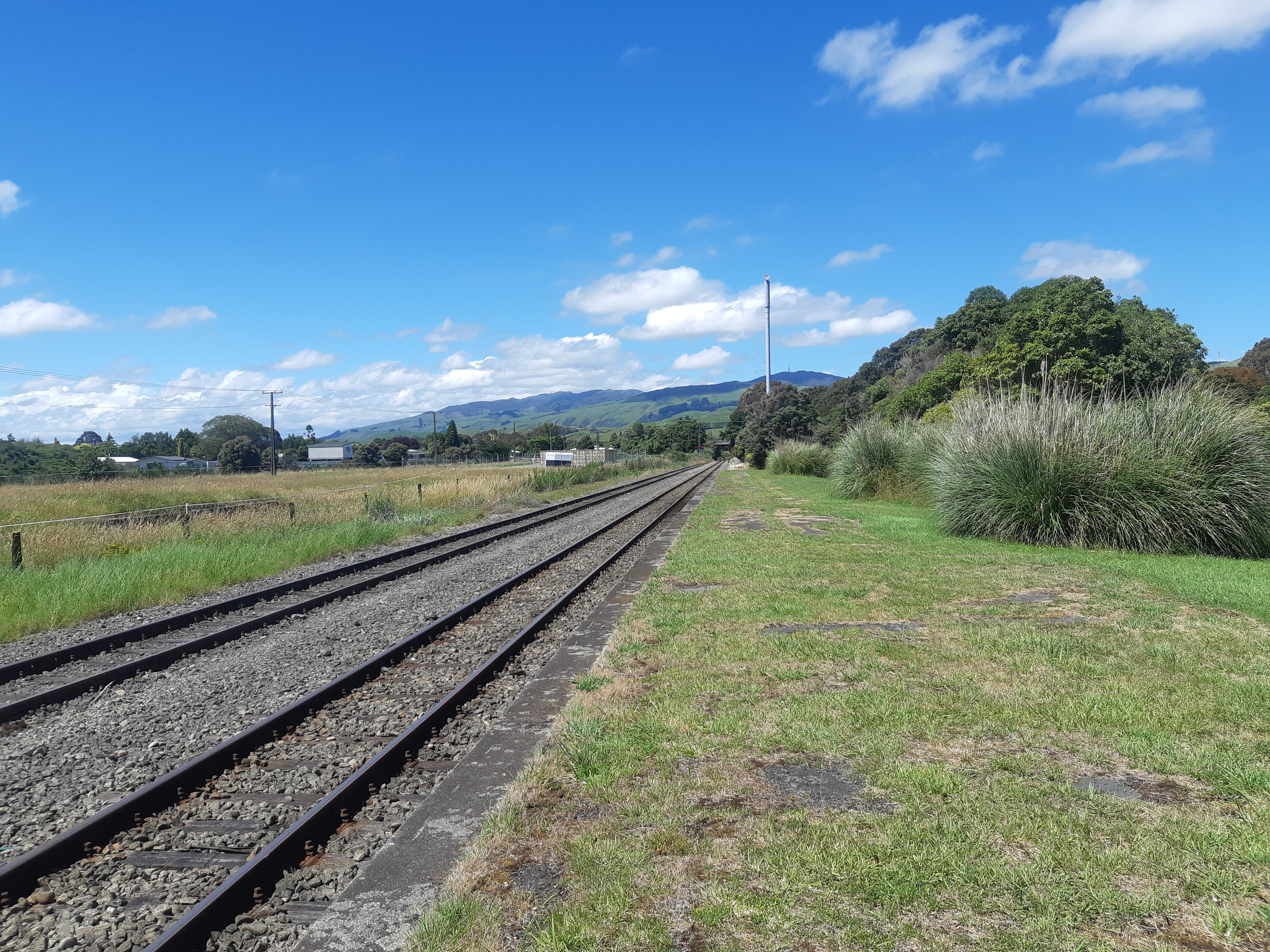
- The station in 2021, showing the barren platform

General information
- Location: York Street, Ashhurst
- Coordinates: 40.296934°S 175.751024°E
- Elevation: 72 m (236 ft)
- System: New Zealand Government Railways (NZGR) regional rail
- Line: Palmerston North–Gisborne Line
- Platforms: Single
- Tracks: Mainline (1); Loop (1)

Construction
- Structure type: None

History
- Opened: 4 March 1891
- Closed: 9 October 1983 (freight); 7 October 2001 (passengers)
- Rebuilt: 1981
- Former names: Ashurst until 13 June 1898

Services
Preceding station	Historical railways	Following station
Whakarongo; Line open, station closed 7.31 km (4.54 mi) towards PN	Palmerston North - Gisborne Line; KiwiRail	The Gorge; Line open, station closed 5 mi 40 ch (8.9 km) towards Napier
Location
Notes
- Previous Station: Whakarongo Station; Next Station: The Gorge Station

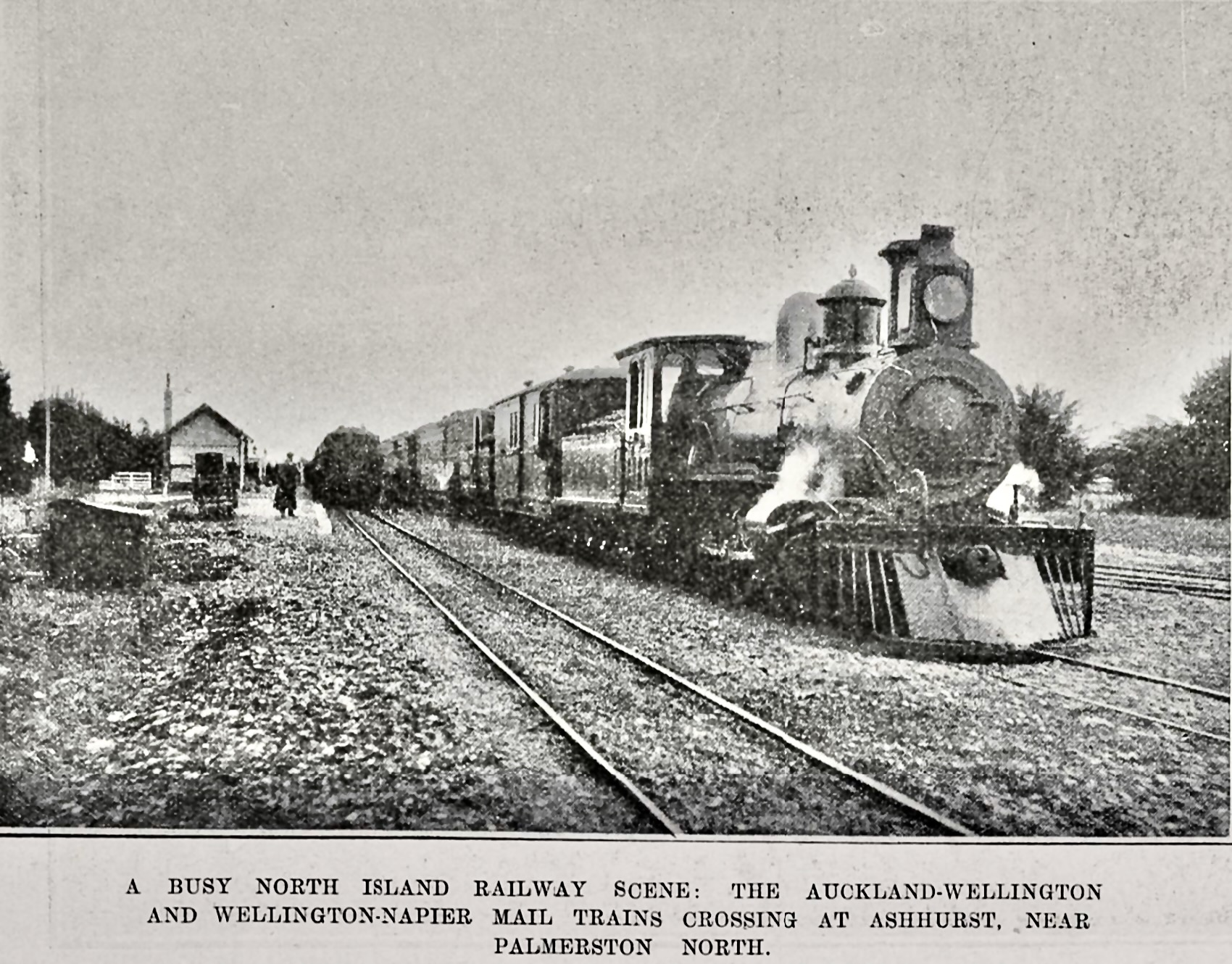
Ashhurst in 1911 with an A Class loco

Ashhurst Railway Station exists on the Palmerston North–Gisborne Line between Palmerston North and the Manawatū Gorge serving the town of Ashhurst. The station was a flag-stop station before being made a formal stop in 1892. The station was sold in 1980 and the buildings and facilities were demolished in 1981, being replaced by a simple concrete shelter (similar to a bus shelter), which was removed after 2013. The station was closed in 2001. No regular passenger service uses the line and there are no-longer any structures at the station, except the passing loop, abandoned platform and a track-workers' hut.

== History ==
Plans were made for the station buildings in June 1890, in December 1890 tenders were called for a goods shed and cattle yard and they were being built the next month.

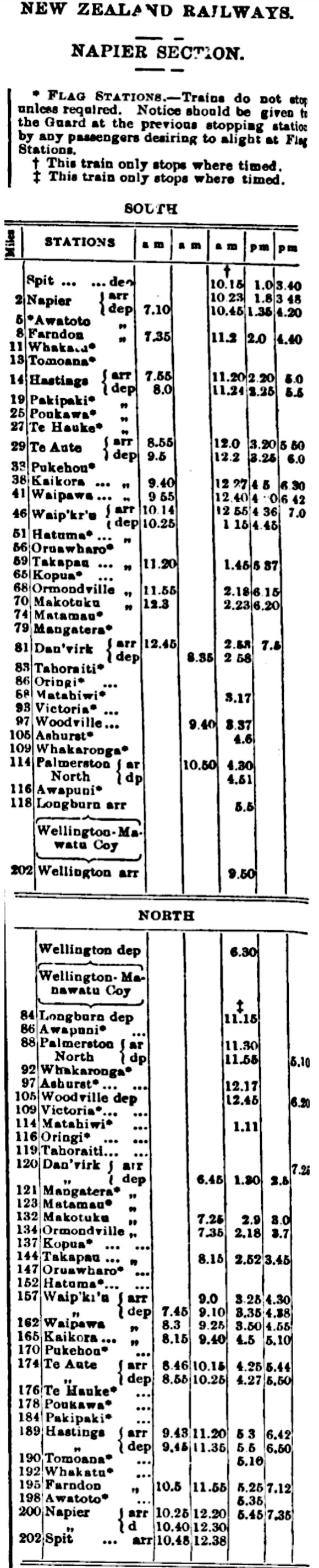
1891 Napier timetable

Although NZR records show Ashurst station opened on Wednesday, 4 March 1891, newspaper reports and Parliamentary papers record the opening of the 17 mi 21 ch (27.8 km) Woodville-Palmerston section of line as being on Monday, 9 March 1891. On the opening day most of the town went to the station to greet the passengers travelling on the trains from Napier and Wellington, which passed at Ashurst. The work had taken 5 years and cost about £190,000. Initially the station was served by two trains a day in each direction. In 1969 there were three in each direction.

By the end of 1891 there was a shelter shed, platform, urinals, cart approach, 40 ft (12 m) x 30 ft (9.1 m) goods shed, cattle yards, loading bank, in 1893 a stationmaster's house was built and by 1896 it also had a 5th class station building, loading bank, water service and a passing loop for 24 wagons. Additions were made in 1907 and a verandah added after 1910. By 1911 sheep yards, a crane and fixed signals had been added and the loop extended for 42 wagons. In 1954 the cattle was adapted to be handled to facilitate delivery and collection of animals by road trucks.

In the 1937-38 financial year, the passenger count totalled 7,924. In 1918 it was 11,560, in 1930 4,314, in 1945 10,286 and in 1950 6,635.

A number of Railway Cottages were built to the north of the Station on the Manawatu Scenic Route Road level crossing. One of which proved to cause poor visibility at the level crossing and was recommended for removal. The Ashhurst over-bridge was later constructed. A cottage was built in 1892, a porter's house in 1926 and a State house in 1956. As of 2022, three 1920s-scheme houses remain alongside a railway house of the 1930s-50 schemes.

From 9 October 1983 the station was closed to all except passenger traffic. Just as there is doubt about the opening date, although the railway records show that passenger services ended on 11 May 1979, fare revisions continued to be published until at least 1982. The last passenger train on the line, the Bay Express ceased running on Sunday, 7 October 2001, but did not stop at Ashhurst.

== Name change ==
In 1897 it was realised that the name of Ashurst was a clerical error, but renaming was left, "until the building requires painting", so it was reported on 10 June 1898 that the name board had been altered to “Ashhurst” and that name was to be used after 13 June 1898. The name of the post office was changed in 1898.

== Pohangina River bridge ==
Just over a kilometre east of the station, the line crosses the Pohangina River on a 224 m (735 ft) bridge (No.5), of 8 x 80 ft (24 m) girders, built between 1888 and 1890.
