= Palmerston North railway station =

Railway station in New Zealand

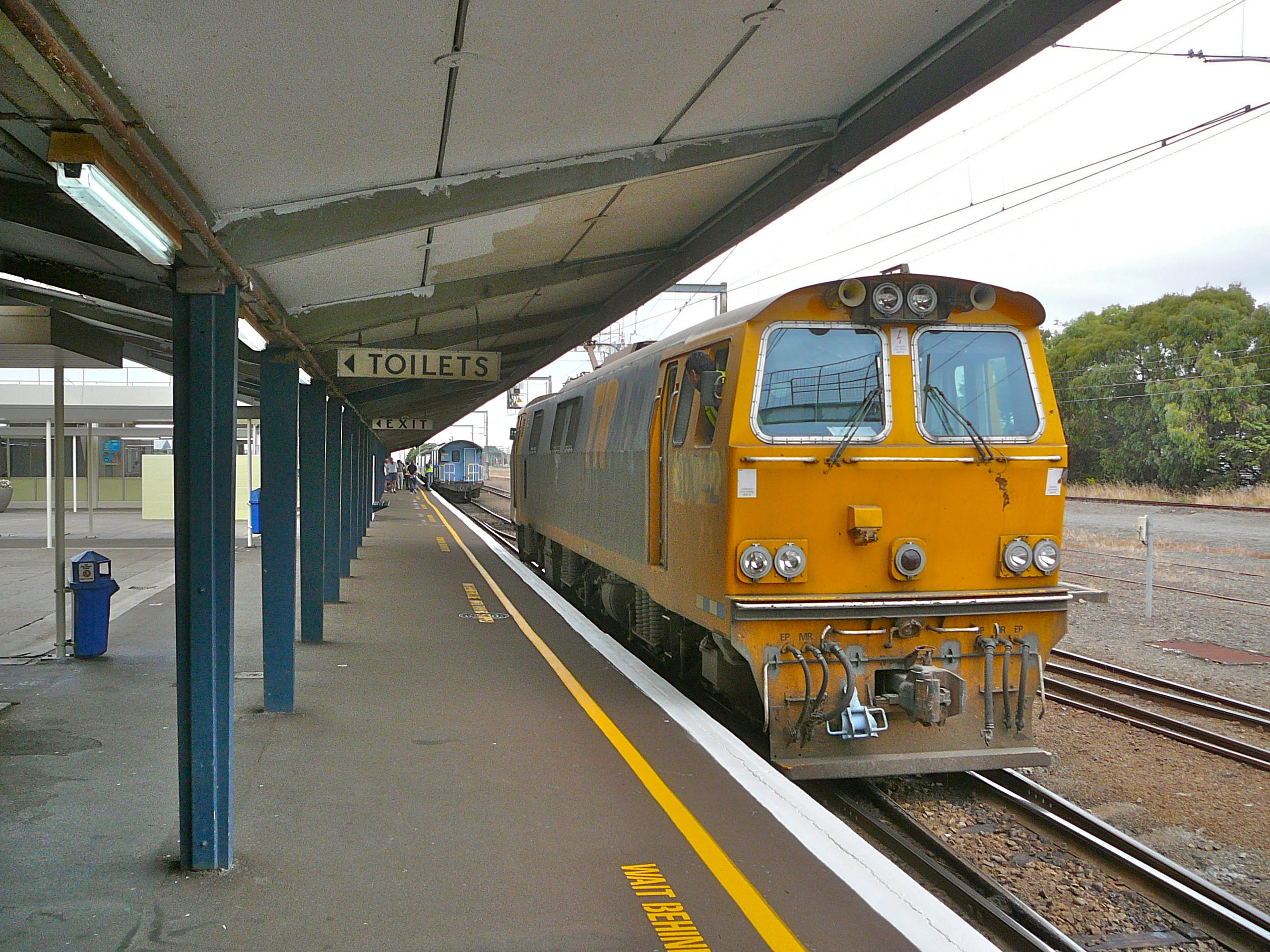
- An electric EF class 30042 backing onto the Overlander at Palmerston North Railway Station, 2007.

General information
- Location: 38 Matthews Avenue, Takaro, Palmerston North 4410; New Zealand
- Coordinates: 40°20′40″S 175°35′40″E
- Elevation: 30 m (98 ft)
- System: Great Journeys New Zealand Inter-city / KiwiRail regional rail
- Owner: KiwiRail
- Line: North Island Main Trunk
- Distance: Wellington 136.23 km (84.65 mi)
- Platforms: 1 side platform, 1 dock platform (disused)
- Tracks: 1
- Connections: Palmerston North–Gisborne Line (goods only)

Construction
- Parking: Yes
- Cycle facilities: Yes
- Architect: Ivan Clarkson
- Architectural style: Mid-century modern

History
- Opened: 21 October 1963; 62 years ago
- Electrified: 25 kV 50 Hz AC June 1988

Services
Preceding station	KiwiRail	Following station
Terminus	Capital Connection	Shannon towards Wellington
Preceding station	Great Journeys New Zealand	Following station
Ohakune towards Auckland Strand	Northern Explorer	Paraparaumu towards Wellington

Historic railways
Preceding station	Historical railways	Following station
Terminus	Palmerston North–Gisborne Line; KiwiRail	Whakarongo; Line open, station closed 8.75 km (5.44 mi)
Bunnythorpe; Line open, station closed 8.52 km (5.29 mi)	North Island Main Trunk; KiwiRail	Longburn; Line open, station closed 6.29 km (3.91 mi)
Location

Palmerston North railway station is a main station on the North Island Main Trunk serving the city of Palmerston North in the Manawatū-Whanganui region of New Zealand.

It is the northern terminus of the Capital Connection long-distance commuter train to Wellington and a major stop on the Northern Explorer service between Auckland and Wellington.

A new Palmerston North (regional) intermodal freight hub is proposed by KiwiRail for a site to the north-east of Palmerston North. The plan has been developed with a grant of $40 million from the Provincial Growth Fund, as announced by the minister Shane Jones on 15 November 2018. The freight hub would replace the Tremaine Avenue freight yard, which is to the east of the station and provides mainly for freight to Auckland, Wellington, Christchurch and Dunedin.

== Milson deviation ==
The original Palmerston North Central railway station was opened on 20 October 1876. Traffic increased with the opening of the line to Napier via Woodville in 1891, and the station was moved 30 chains (603m) south in March 1891. But it was still a bottleneck, and remained the longest-persisting bottleneck on the Main Trunk until the 1960s.

Changes were recommended by Hiley in 1914, a commission in 1916 and the Fay-Raven commission in 1924–25. Construction of the Milson deviation to shift the line and station northwest and away from the centre of Palmerston North started in May 1926, but was delayed by the depression and Second World War, and objections from the local business quarter; when work was suspended in April 1929, the reasons given by Prime Minister, Sir Joseph Ward, included the distance of the new station from the town centre.

Work by the Public Works Department (PWD) was stopped on 18 April 1929, when within 42 ch (840 m) of completion, by Minister of Works Alfred Ransom and restarted in 1938 by Bob Semple but halted by the Second World War. Work finally resumed in 1957 under Minister John McAlpine, the first stage to Milson from the north-east was opened on 22 April 1954. The deviation was opened to Longburn for through goods trains on 27 July 1959. On 21 October 1963, the new station and yards were opened, and all rail traffic removed from the main street and square of Palmerston North. The old line was closed by mid-1965, and the Awapuni railway station south of the main station on the old route was also closed. The new route was 1 mi 4 ch (1.7 km) shorter than the old.

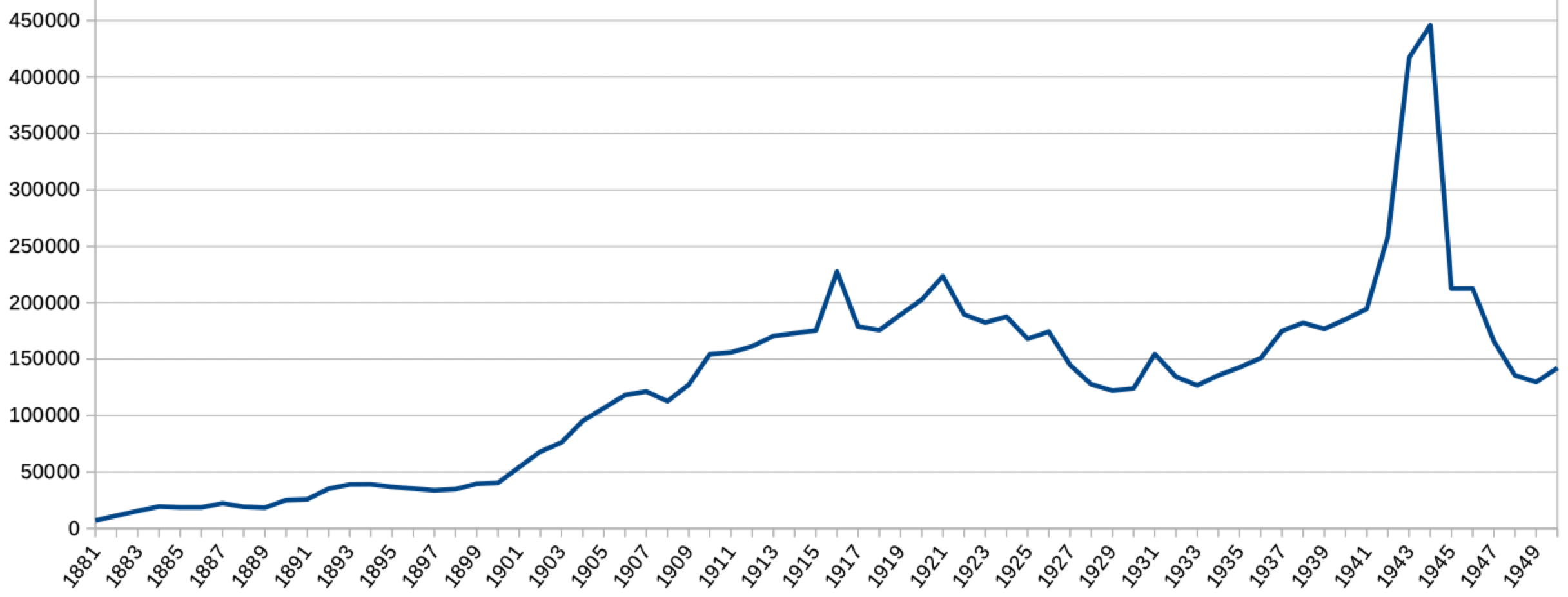
Tickets sales 1881–1950 – derived from annual returns to Parliament of "Statement of Revenue for each Station for the Year ended"

== Current use ==
The station currently serves one route – the Capital Connection. This service see the station visited by 1 or 2 trains per weekday – down from >60 when the station was opened.

With the introduction of the New Zealand BEMU class electric multiple unit from 2030 for passenger services from Wellington, they will have charging points at the station.

Heritage excursions also occasionally use the station. The main building is used as KiwiRail offices or storage, and the old cafeteria is used as an after-school care centre. The station is not served by a city bus route but has a taxi rank.

== Gallery ==
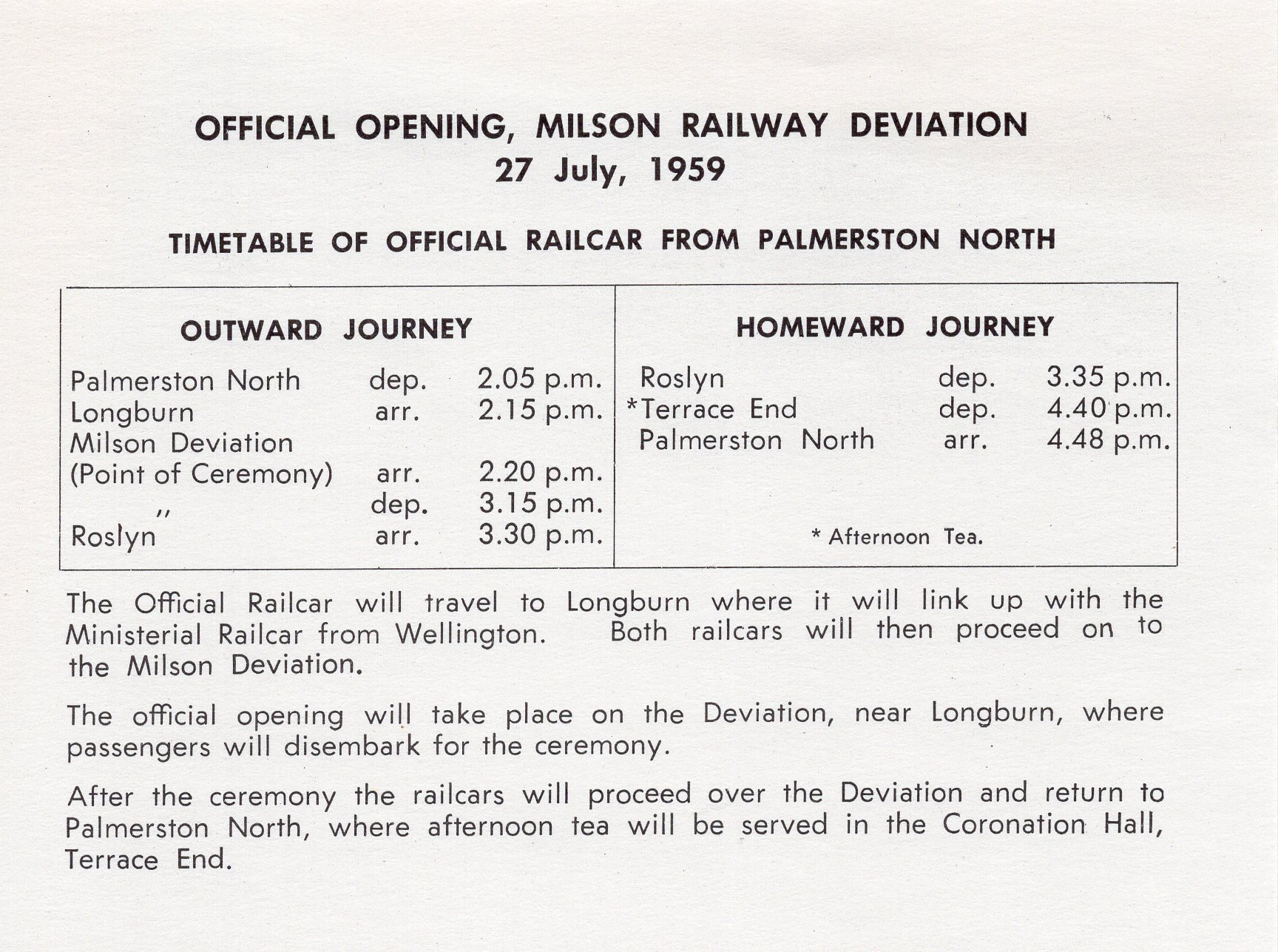
Official opening of Milson Deviation - 27 July 1959

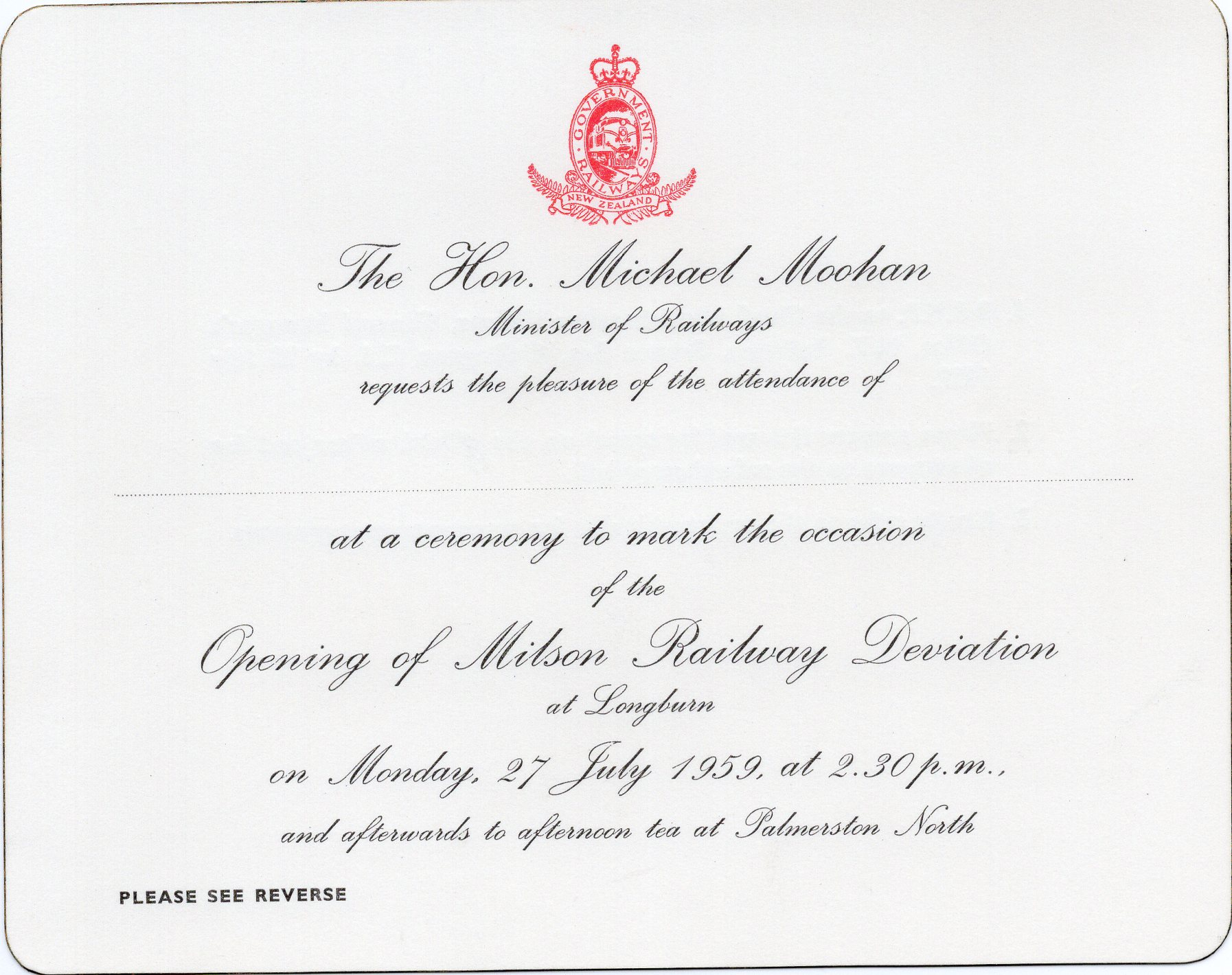
Milson Deviation Opening Ceremony - 27 July 1959

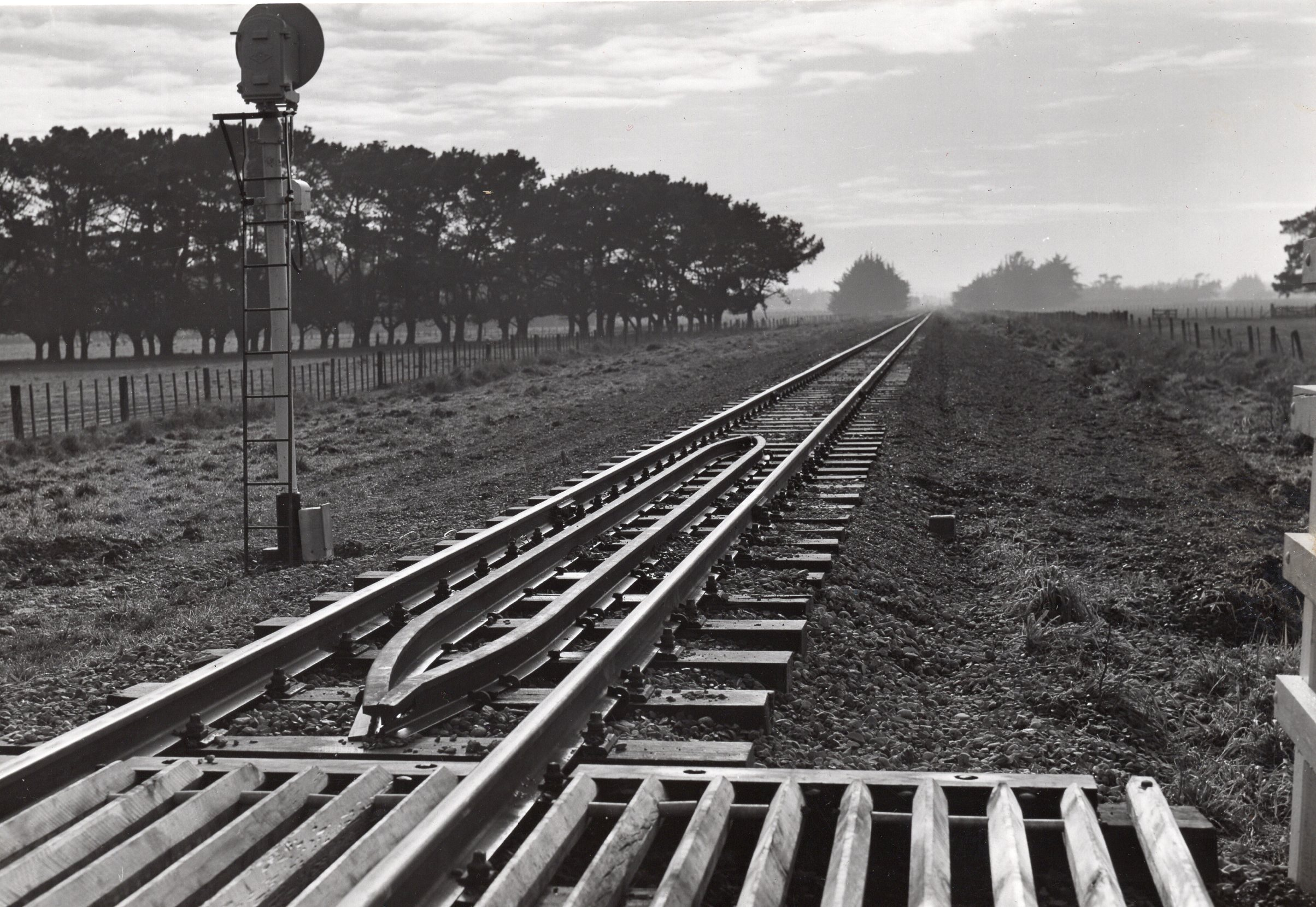
Milson Deviation
