= 1902 =

1902 in various calendars
- Gregorian calendar: 1902; MCMII
- Ab urbe condita: 2655
- Armenian calendar: 1351; ԹՎ ՌՅԾԱ
- Assyrian calendar: 6652
- Baháʼí calendar: 58–59
- Balinese saka calendar: 1823–1824
- Bengali calendar: 1308–1309
- Berber calendar: 2852
- British Regnal year: 1 Edw. 7 – 2 Edw. 7
- Buddhist calendar: 2446
- Burmese calendar: 1264
- Byzantine calendar: 7410–7411
- Chinese calendar: 辛丑年 (Metal Ox); 4599 or 4392 — to — 壬寅年 (Water Tiger); 4600 or 4393
- Coptic calendar: 1618–1619
- Discordian calendar: 3068
- Ethiopian calendar: 1894–1895
- Hebrew calendar: 5662–5663
- Hindu calendars
- Vikram Samvat: 1958–1959
- Shaka Samvat: 1823–1824
- Kali Yuga: 5002–5003
- Holocene calendar: 11902
- Igbo calendar: 902–903
- Iranian calendar: 1280–1281
- Islamic calendar: 1319–1320
- Japanese calendar: Meiji 35 (明治３５年)
- Javanese calendar: 1831–1832
- Julian calendar: Gregorian minus 13 days
- Korean calendar: 4235
- Minguo calendar: 10 before ROC 民前10年
- Nanakshahi calendar: 434
- Thai solar calendar: 2444–2445
- Tibetan calendar: ལྕགས་མོ་གླང་ལོ་ (female Iron-Ox); 2028 or 1647 or 875 — to — ཆུ་ཕོ་སྟག་ལོ་ (male Water-Tiger); 2029 or 1648 or 876

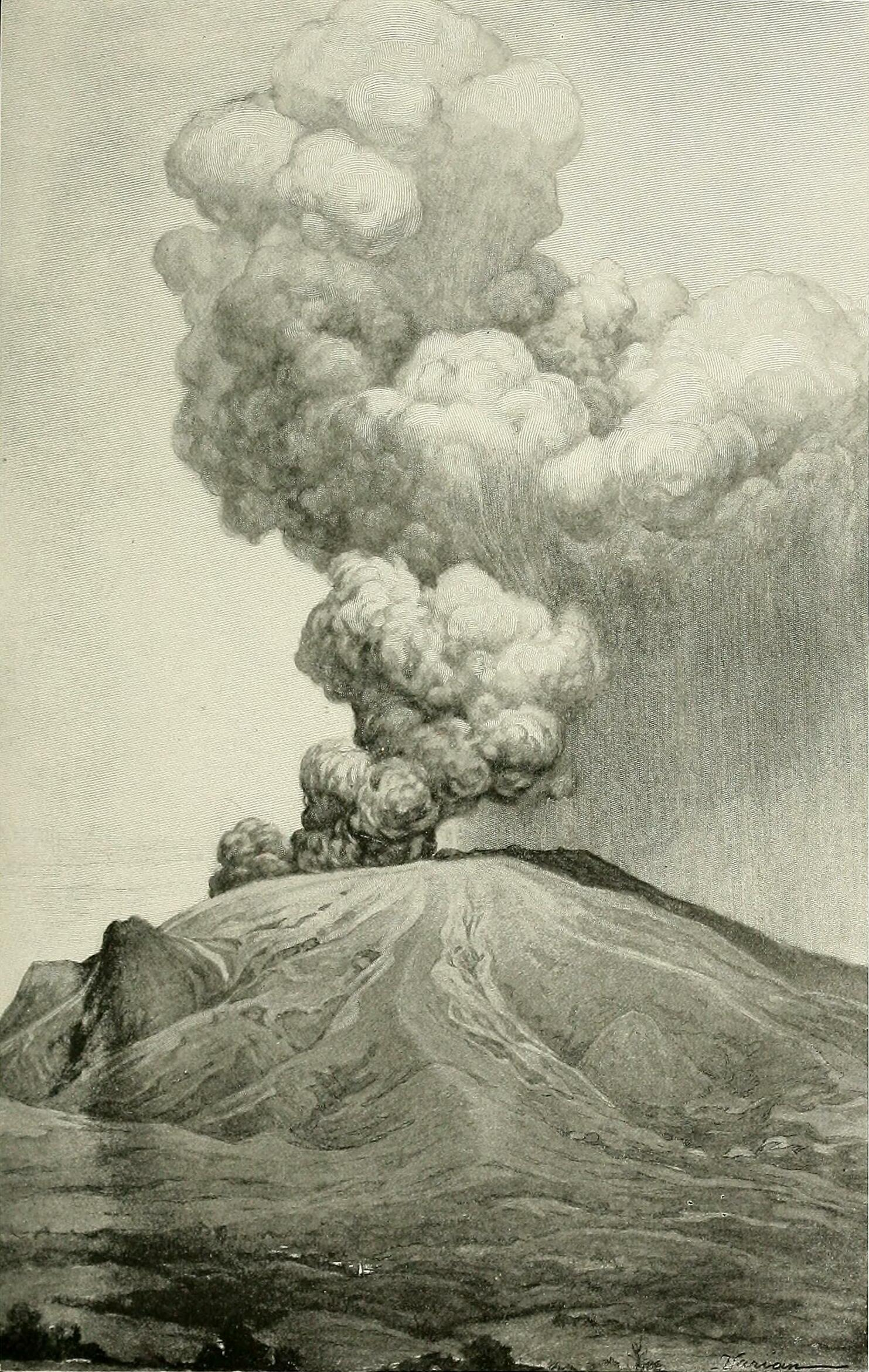
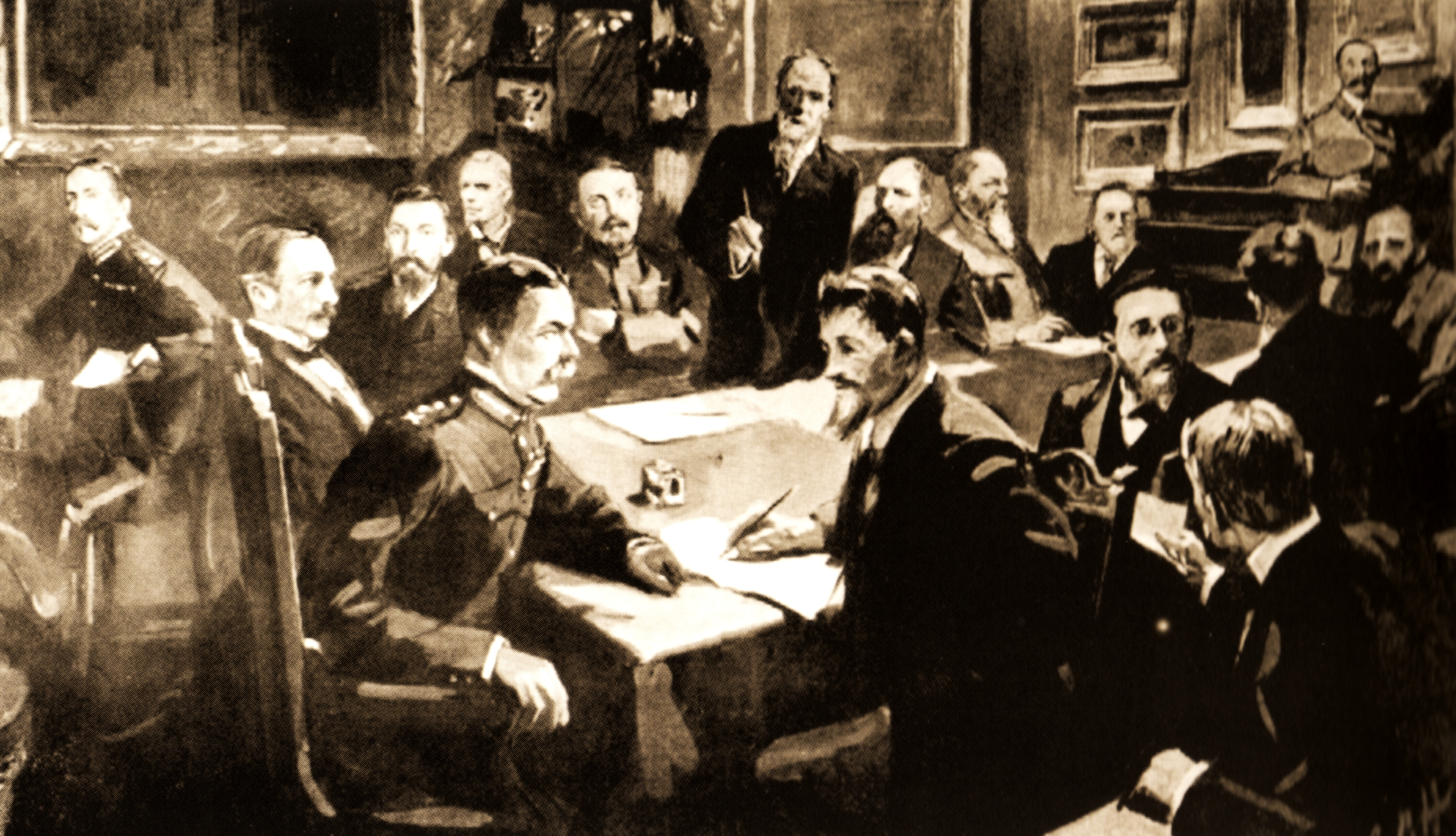
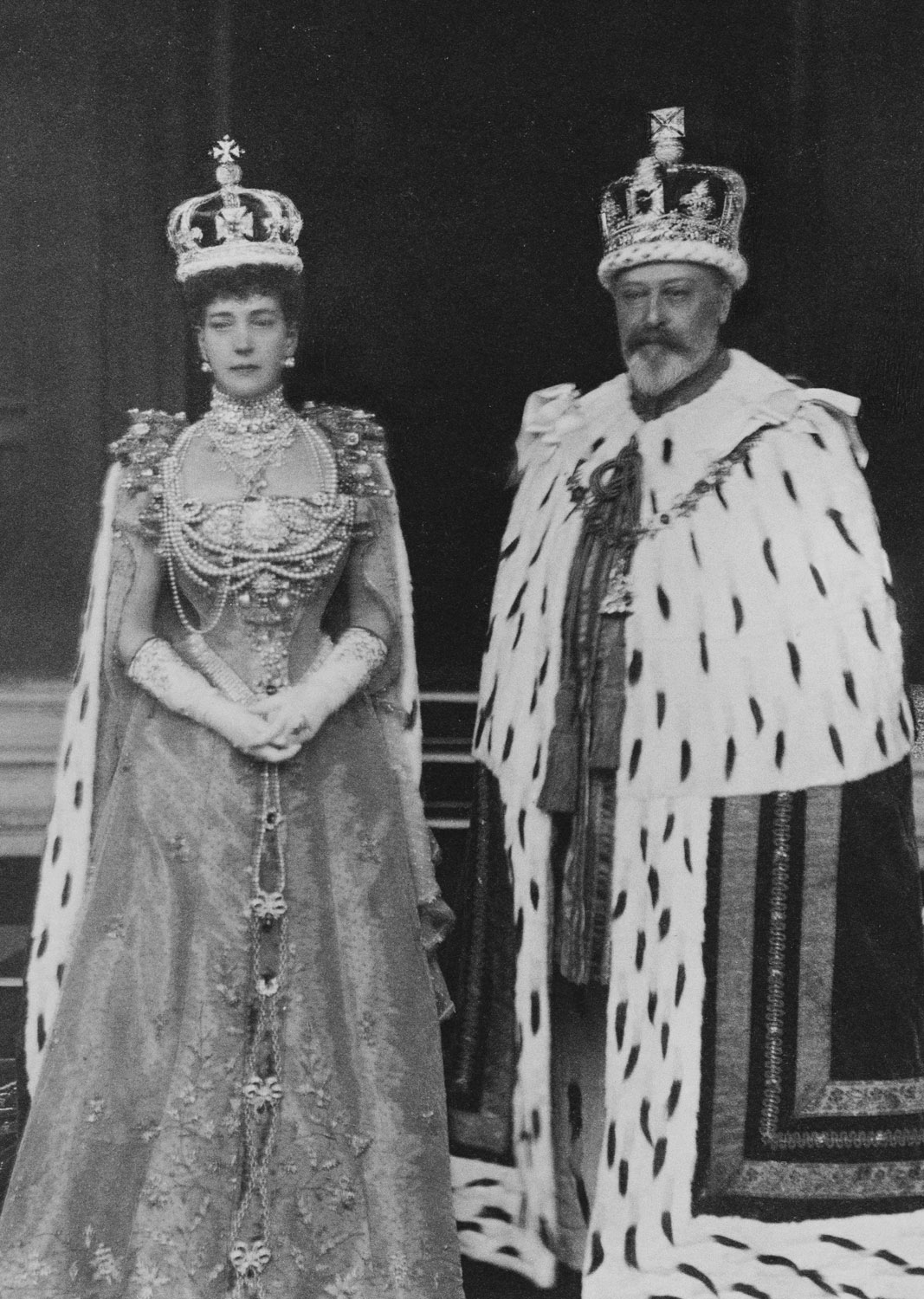
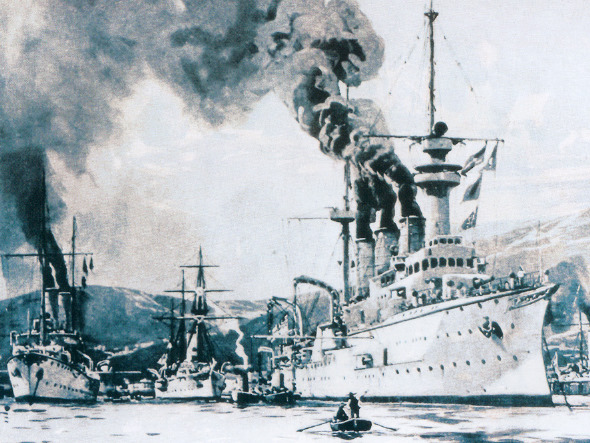
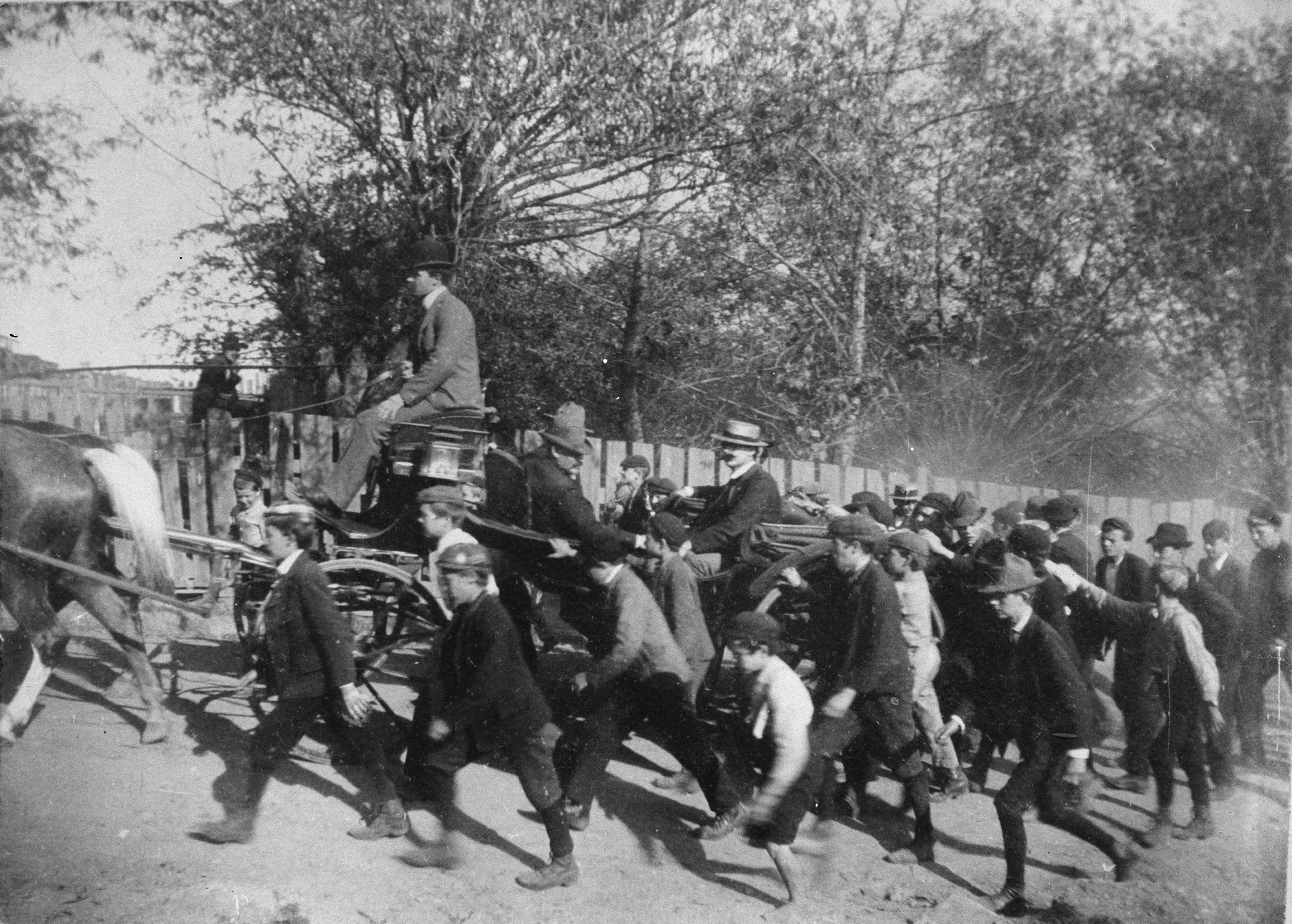
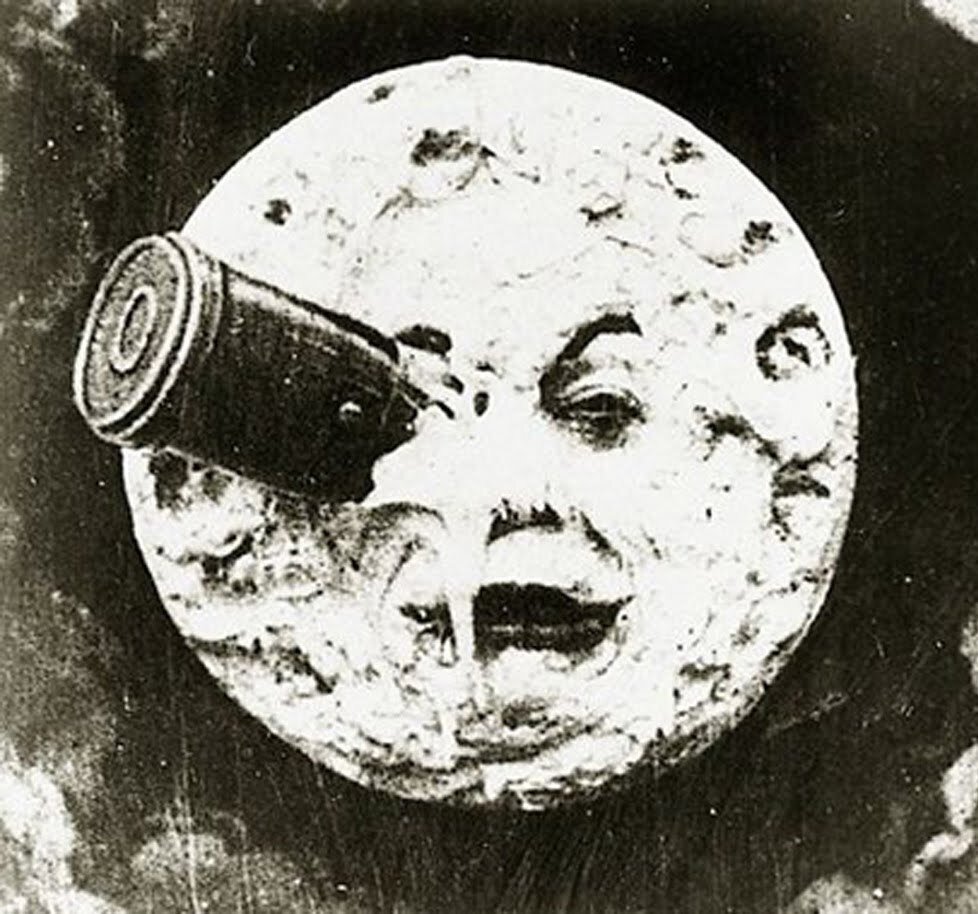
From top to bottom, left to right:
- The 1902 eruption of Mount Pelée devastates Saint-Pierre in Martinique, killing nearly 30,000 and becoming one of history’s deadliest volcanic disasters;
- The Second Boer War ends with the Treaty of Vereeniging, bringing the Boer republics under British control;
- The Coronation of Edward VII and Alexandra at Westminster Abbey formally begins the Edwardian era;
- The Venezuelan crisis of 1902–1903 sees European powers blockade Venezuelan ports over debts, prompting U.S. diplomatic intervention;
- The Anthracite coal strike of 1902 leads to President Theodore Roosevelt mediating labor demands for higher wages and shorter workdays;
- The French silent film A Trip to the Moon by Georges Méliès premieres, becoming an iconic early cinematic work.

1902 (MCMII) was a common year starting on Wednesday of the Gregorian calendar and a common year starting on Tuesday of the Julian calendar, the 1902nd year of the Common Era (CE) and Anno Domini (AD) designations, the 902nd year of the 2nd millennium, the 2nd year of the 20th century, and the 3rd year of the 1900s decade. As of the start of 1902, the Gregorian calendar was 13 days ahead of the Julian calendar, which remained in localized use until 1923.

== Events ==
=== January ===
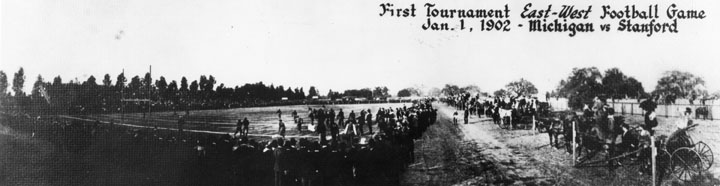
January 1: first Rose Bowl college American football game.

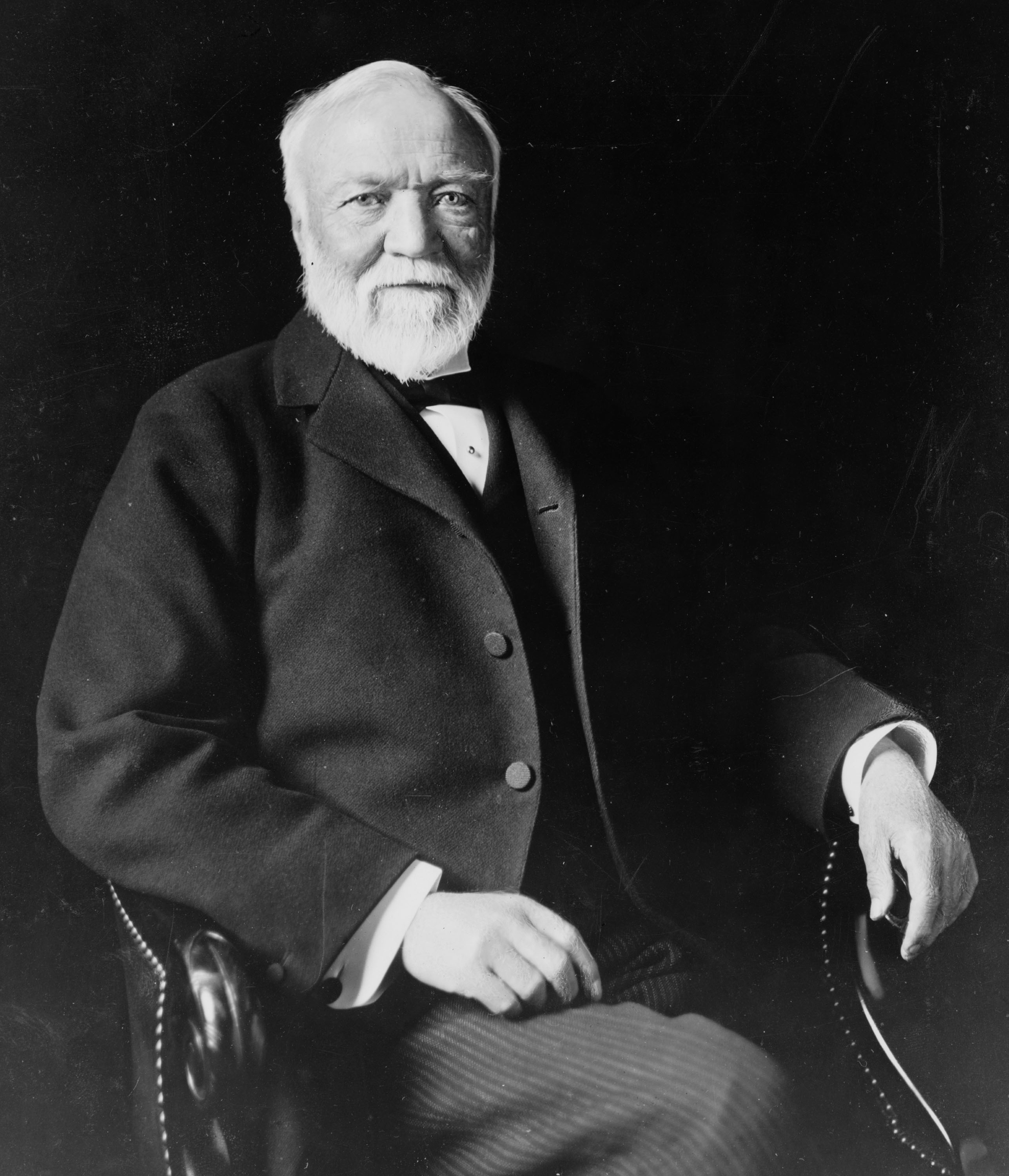
Andrew Carnegie

- January 1
  - The Nurses Registration Act 1901 comes into effect in New Zealand, making it the first country in the world to require state registration of nurses. On January 10, Ellen Dougherty becomes the world's first registered nurse.
  - Nathan Stubblefield demonstrates his wireless telephone device in the U.S. state of Kentucky.
- January 8 – A train collision in the New York Central Railroad's Park Avenue Tunnel kills 17 people, injures 38, and leads to increased demand for electric trains and the banning of steam locomotives in New York City.
- January 23 – Hakkōda Mountains incident: A snowstorm in the Hakkōda Mountains of northern Honshu, Japan, kills 199 during a military training exercise.
- January 29 – The Carnegie Institution is founded in Washington, D.C., to promote scientific research with a $10 million gift from Andrew Carnegie.
- January 30 – The Anglo-Japanese Alliance is signed.

=== February ===
- February 12 – The 1st Conference of the International Woman Suffrage Alliance takes place in Washington, D.C.
- February 15 – The Berlin U-Bahn underground is opened.
- February 18 – U.S. President Theodore Roosevelt prosecutes the Northern Securities Company for violation of the antitrust Sherman Act.
- February 27 – Australian officers Breaker Morant and Peter Handcock are executed for the murder of Boer prisoners of war near Louis Trichardt.

=== March ===
- March 7 – Second Boer War: Battle of Tweebosch – South African Boers win their last battle over the British Army, with the capture of a British general and 200 of his men.
- March 8 – Jean Sibelius's Symphony No. 2 is premiered in Helsinki.
- March 10
  - Clashes between police and Georgian workers led by Joseph Stalin leave 15 dead, 54 wounded, and 500 in prison.
  - A Circuit Court decision in the United States ends Thomas Edison's monopoly on 35 mm movie film technology.
- March 15 – The Pattani Sultanate is abolished by the Siamese authority after the last sultan of Pattani refused new administrative reforms by the Siamese.

=== April ===
- April 2 – The Electric Theatre, the first movie theater in the United States, opens in Los Angeles.
- April 11 – Tenor Enrico Caruso makes the first million-selling recording, for the Gramophone Company in Milan.
- April 13 – A new land speed record of 74 mph (119 km/h) is set in Nice, France, by Léon Serpollet driving a steam car.
- April 19 – The 7.5 M_{w} Guatemala earthquake shakes Guatemala with a maximum Mercalli intensity of VIII (Severe), killing between 800 and 2,000.

=== May ===
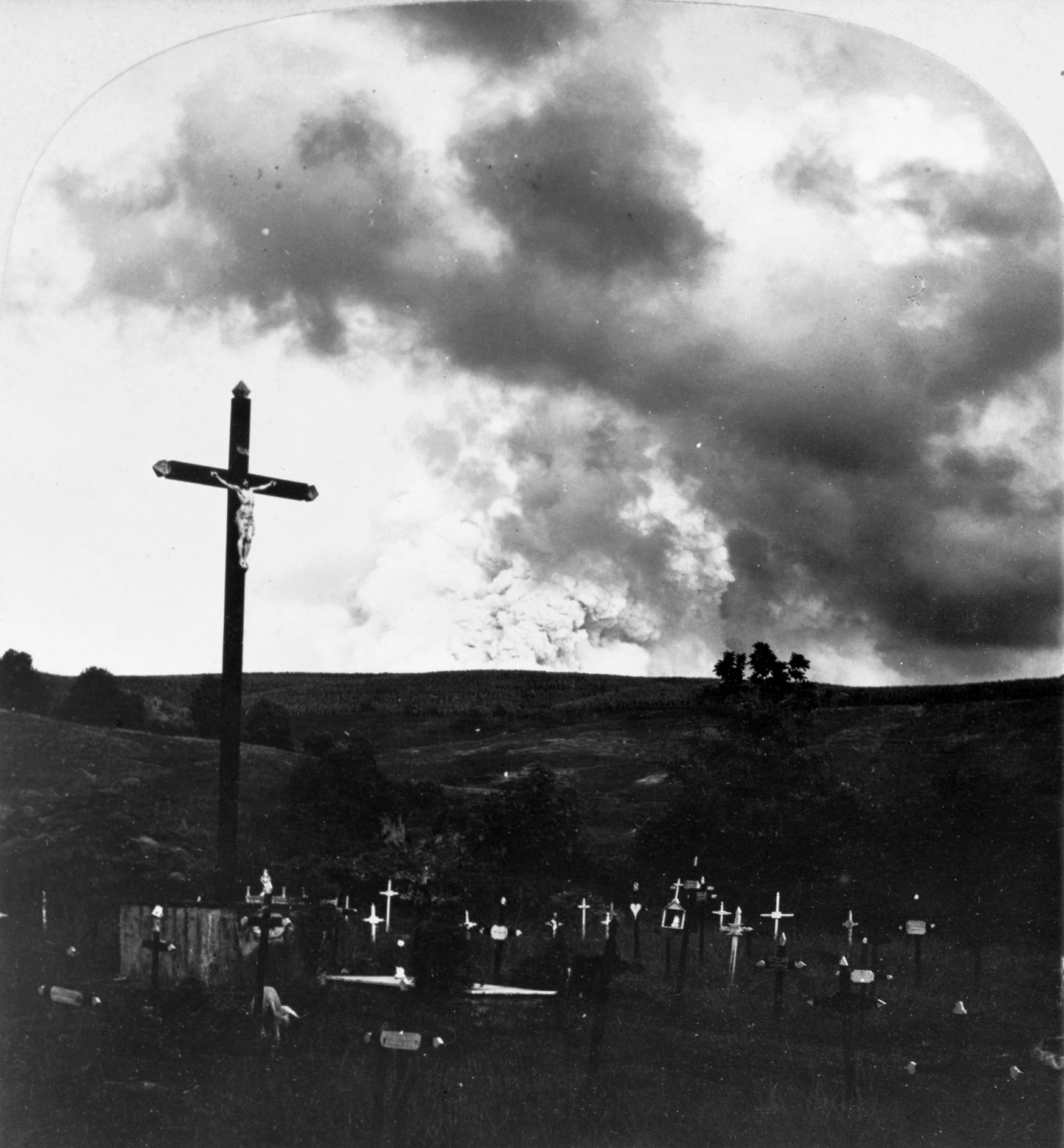
May 8: Mount Pelée erupts.

- May 7 – La Soufrière volcano on the Caribbean island of Saint Vincent erupts, devastating the northern portion of the island and killing 2,000 people
- May 8 – Mount Pelée in Martinique erupts, destroying the town of Saint-Pierre and killing over 30,000.
- May 12 – Brazilian aeronaut Augusto Severo de Albuquerque Maranhão and Georges Saché, his French mechanic, are killed when Severo's airship Pax catches fire and explodes a little over 1,000 ft above Paris. Severo and Saché are both killed upon impact with the ground.
- May 13 – Alfonso XIII of Spain begins his reign.
- May 20 – Cuba gains independence from the United States.
- May 22 – The White Star Liner SS Ionic is launched by Harland and Wolff in Belfast.
- May 29 – The London School of Economics is opened by Lord Rosebery.
- May 31 – The Treaty of Vereeniging ends the Second Boer War, providing for the Transvaal Colony and Orange Free State to transition to self-governing British colonies.

=== June ===
- June 13 – Minnesota Mining and Manufacturing, predecessor of global consumer goods brand 3M, begins trading as a mining venture at Two Harbors in the United States.
- June 15 – The New York Central Railroad inaugurates the 20th Century Limited passenger train between Chicago and New York City.
- June 16 – The Commonwealth Franchise Act in Australia grants women's suffrage in federal elections for resident British subjects (with certain ethnic minorities excepted), making Australia the first independent country to grant women the vote at a national level, and the first country to allow them to stand for Parliament.
- June 26 – Edward VII institutes the Order of Merit, an order bestowed personally by the British monarch on up to 24 distinguished Empire recipients.

=== July ===
- July 2 – Philippine–American War ends.
- July 5 – Erik Gustaf Boström returns as Prime Minister of Sweden.
- July 8 – The United States Bureau of Reclamation is established within the U.S. Geological Survey.
- July 10 – The Rolling Mill Mine disaster in Johnstown, Pennsylvania, kills 112 miners.
- July 11 – Lord Salisbury retires as Prime Minister of the United Kingdom.
- July 14
  - Agustín Lizárraga discovers Machu Picchu, the "Lost City of the Incas".
  - St Mark's Campanile in Venice collapses.
- July 21 – Fluminense Football Club is founded in Rio de Janeiro.

=== August ===
- August 1 – 100 miners die in a pit explosion in Wollongong, Australia.
- August 9 – Coronation of Edward VII as King of the United Kingdom and the British Dominions, Emperor of India at Westminster Abbey in London.
- August 22
  - Theodore Roosevelt becomes the first American President to ride in an automobile, a Columbia Electric Victoria through Hartford, Connecticut.
  - A 7.7 earthquake shakes the border between China and Kyrgyzstan killing 10,000 people.
- August 24 – A statue of Joan of Arc is unveiled in Saint-Pierre-le-Moûtier, the French town which she stormed in 1429.
- August 30 – Mount Pelée again erupts in Martinique, destroying the town of Le Morne-Rouge and causing 1,000 deaths.

=== September ===
- September 1 – The first science fiction film, the silent A Trip to the Moon (Le Voyage dans La Lune), is premièred at the Théâtre Robert-Houdin in Paris, France, by actor/producer Georges Méliès, and proves an immediate success.
- September 19 – Shiloh Baptist Church stampede: 115 people are killed in a crush at a black church in Birmingham, Alabama, following a mistaken alarm of fire after an address by Booker T. Washington.

=== October ===
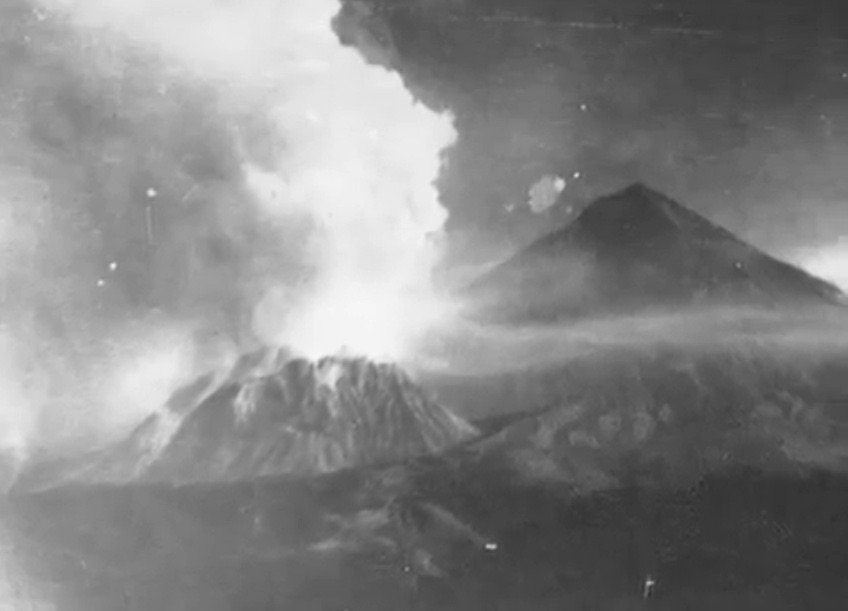
October 24: Santa María erupts

- October 14 – Rimsky-Korsakov's opera Servillia premieres in St. Petersburg
- October 16 – The first Borstal (youth offenders' institution) opens in Borstal, Kent, U.K.
- October 17 – First Cadillac completed, sold and sent to Buffalo, New York
- October 18 – Venezuela: President Castro's army overcomes rebels in seven-day battle
- October 21 – A five-month strike by the United Mine Workers in the United States ends.
- October 24 – One of the largest volcanic eruptions of the 20th century occurs at Santa María in Guatemala; over 6,000 people die.

=== November ===
- November 1 – France attempts to neutralize Triple Alliance, signing agreement with Italy to remain neutral in Africa.
- November 15
  - King Leopold II of Belgium survives an attempted assassination in Brussels by Italian anarchist Gennaro Rubino.
  - The Hanoi exhibition opens in French Indochina.
- November 16 – A newspaper cartoon depicting U.S. President "Teddy" Roosevelt refusing to shoot a bear cub inspires creation of the first teddy bear by Morris Michtom in New York City.
- November 30 – The second-in-command of Butch Cassidy's Wild Bunch, Harvey Logan ("Kid Curry"), is captured after a shootout with lawmen in Knoxville, Tennessee. He is sentenced to a $5,000 fine and 20 years hard labor for robbery but escapes custody in 1903.

=== December ===
- December–February 1903 – Venezuelan crisis: Britain, Germany and Italy sustain a naval blockade on Venezuela, in order to enforce collection of outstanding financial claims. This prompts the development of the Roosevelt Corollary to the Monroe Doctrine.
- December 10 – The first Aswan Dam on the Nile is completed.
- December 17 – The Commercial Telegraph Agency (TTA, Torgovo-Telegrafnue Agenstvo), predecessor of TASS, is officially established under the Ministry of Finance at Saint Petersburg in the Russian Empire.
- December 21 – Newfoundland - Guglielmo Marconi sends wireless messages across the Atlantic.
- December 30 – Discovery Expedition: British explorers Scott, Shackleton and Wilson reach the furthest southern point reached thus far by man, south of 82°S.

=== Date unknown ===
- The capital of French Indochina is moved from Saigon (in Cochinchina) to Hanoi (Tonkin).
- Construction of the Paul Doumer Bridge, linking both sections of Hanoi, is completed.
- The first Korean Empire passports are issued to assist Korean immigration to Hawaii.
- De'Longhi home appliance brand is founded in Treviso, Italy.
- Daniels Linseed, predecessor of Archer Daniels Midland (ADM), a global livestock, commodities trading, food processing brand, is founded in Minnesota, United States.

== Births ==
=== January ===
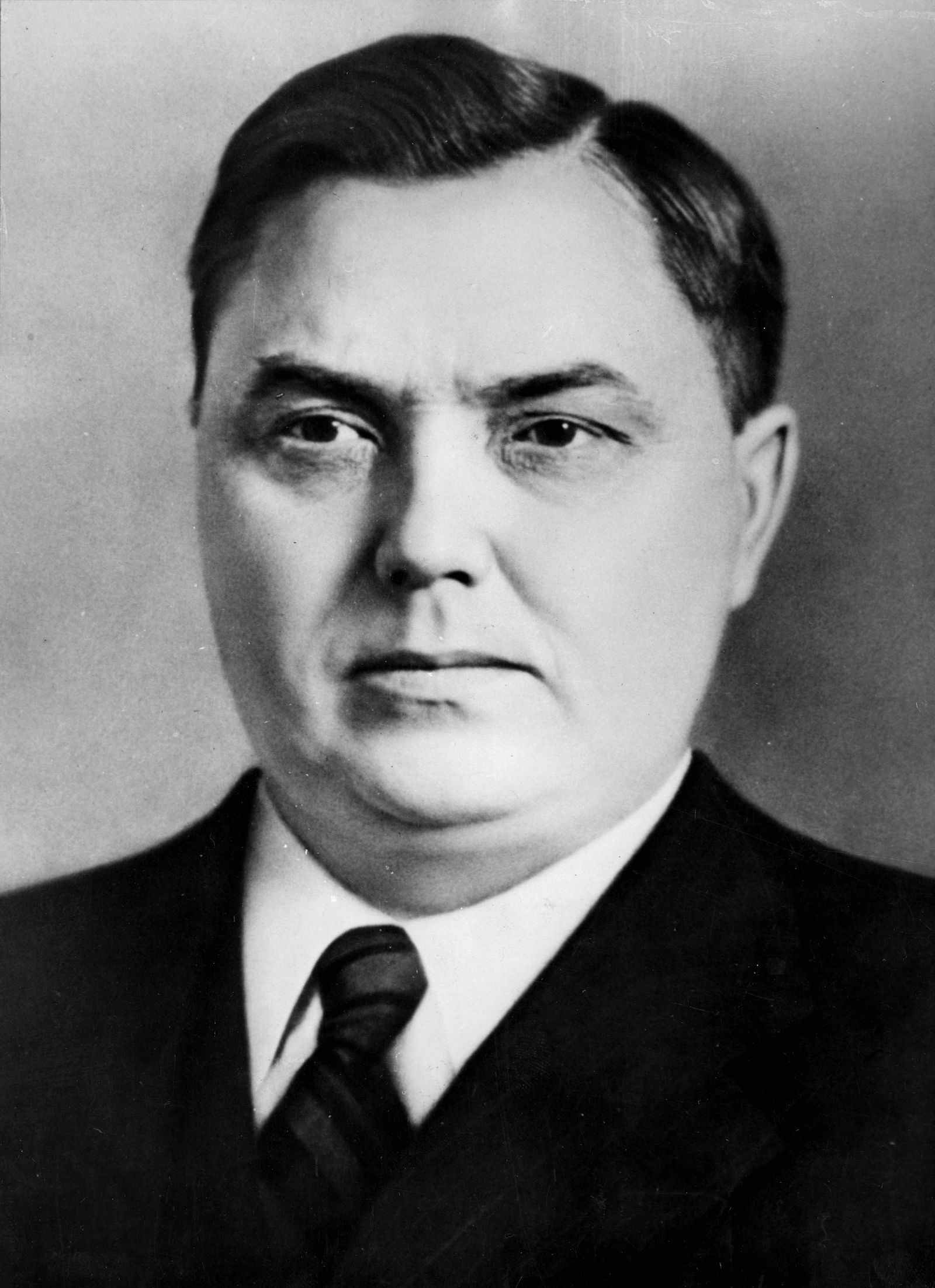
Georgy Malenkov

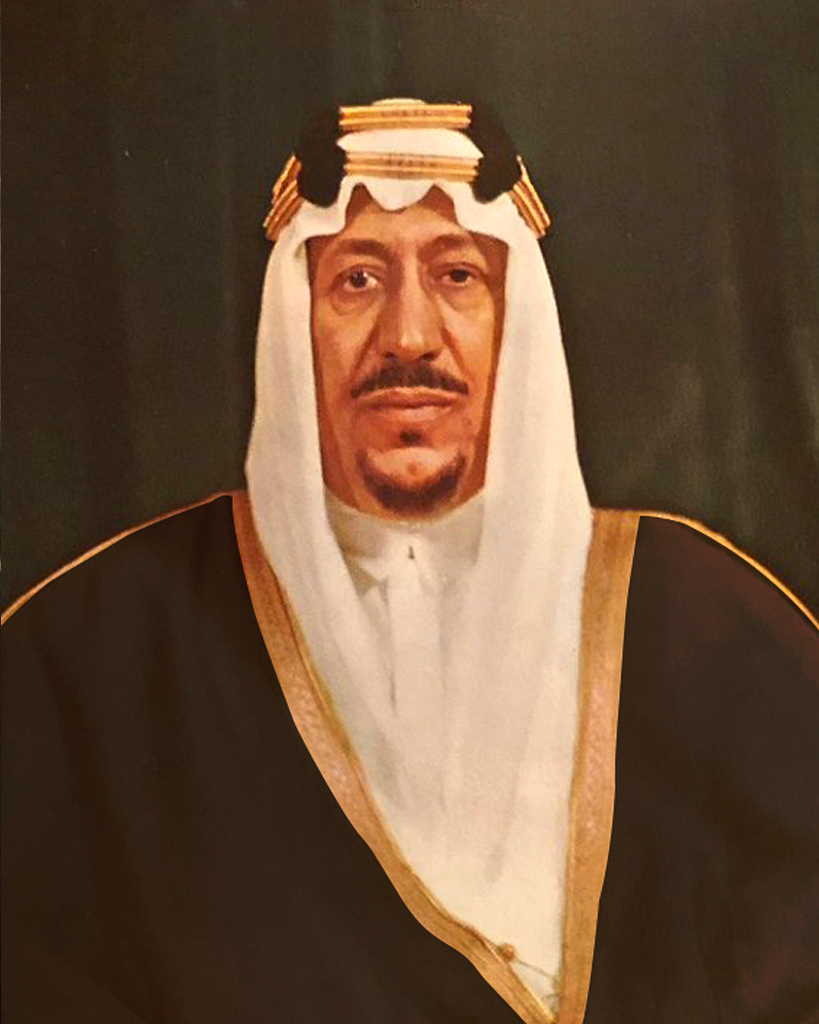
Saud of Saudi Arabia

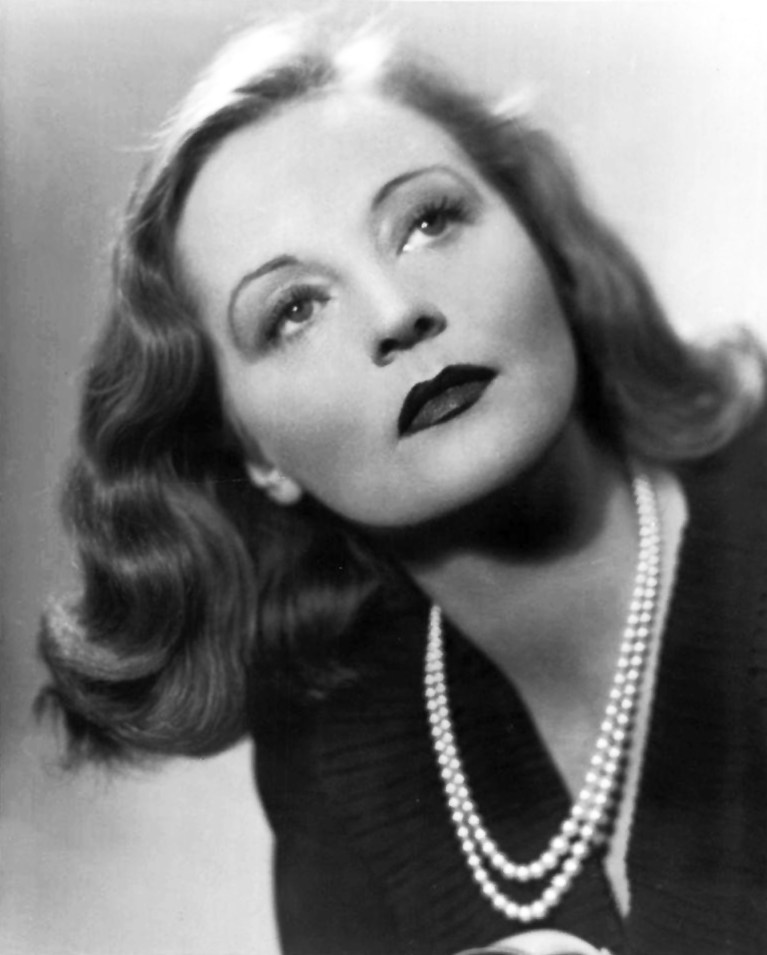
Tallulah Bankhead

- January 4 – John A. McCone, American politician, 6th Director of Central Intelligence (d. 1991)
- January 8 – Georgy Malenkov, Soviet politician (d. 1988)
- January 9
  - Sir Rudolf Bing, Austrian-born British opera manager (d. 1997)
  - Josemaría Escrivá, Spanish Roman Catholic priest and saint (d. 1975)
- January 11
  - Maurice Duruflé, French composer (d. 1986)
  - Evelyn Dove, British singer and actress (d. 1987)
- January 15
  - Nâzım Hikmet, Turkish poet and director (d. 1963)
  - King Saud of Saudi Arabia (d. 1969)
- January 16 – Eric Liddell, Scottish runner (d. 1945)
- January 20
  - Kevin Barry, Irish republican (d. 1920)
  - Leon Ames, American actor (d. 1993)
- January 22 – Daniel Kinsey, American hurdler (d. 1970)
- January 25 – André Beaufre, French general (d. 1975)
- January 26 – Menno ter Braak, Dutch author, polemicist (d. 1940)
- January 31
  - Tallulah Bankhead, American actress (d. 1968)
  - Alva Myrdal, Swedish politician, diplomat, and writer, recipient of the Nobel Peace Prize (d. 1986)

=== February ===
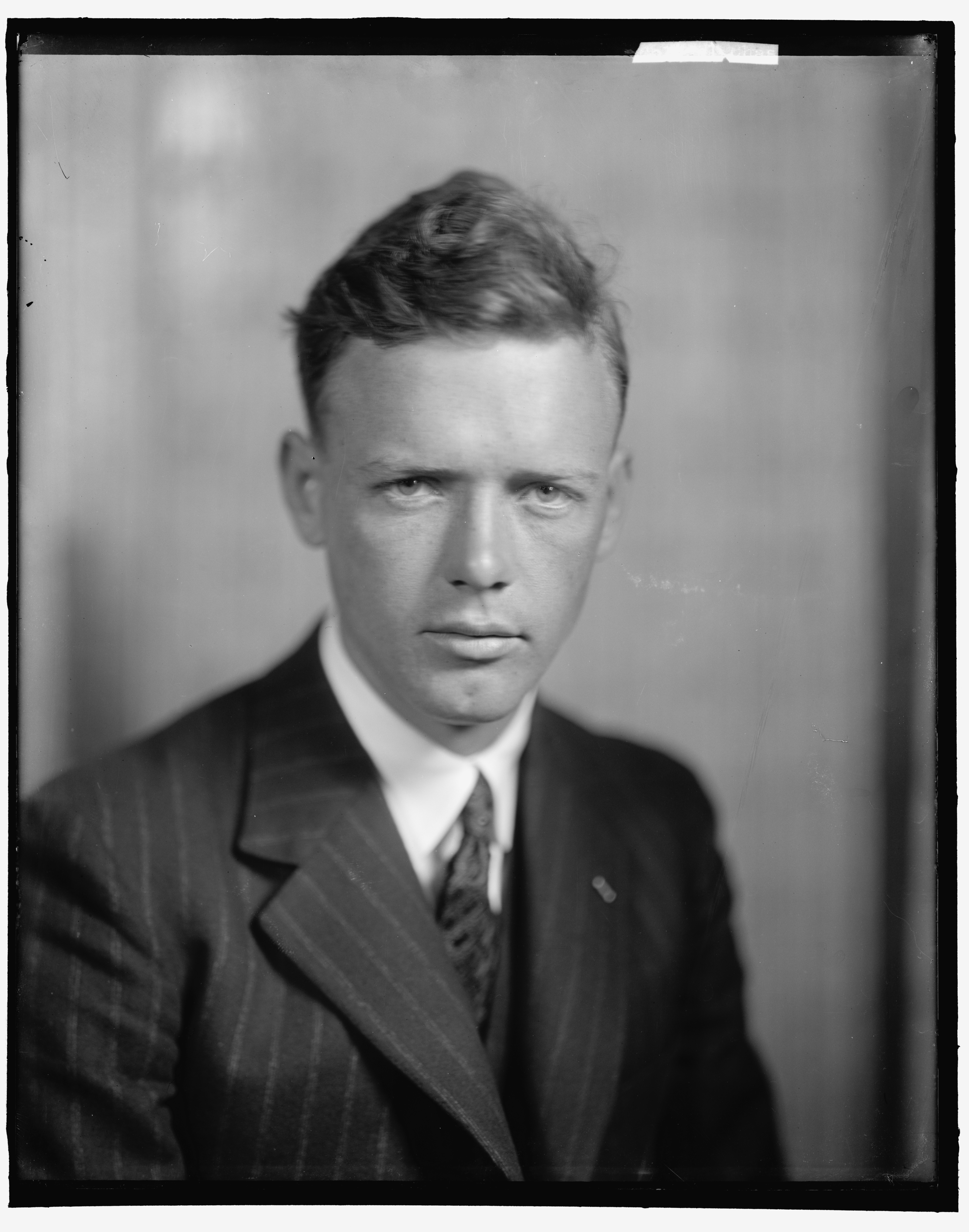
Charles Lindbergh

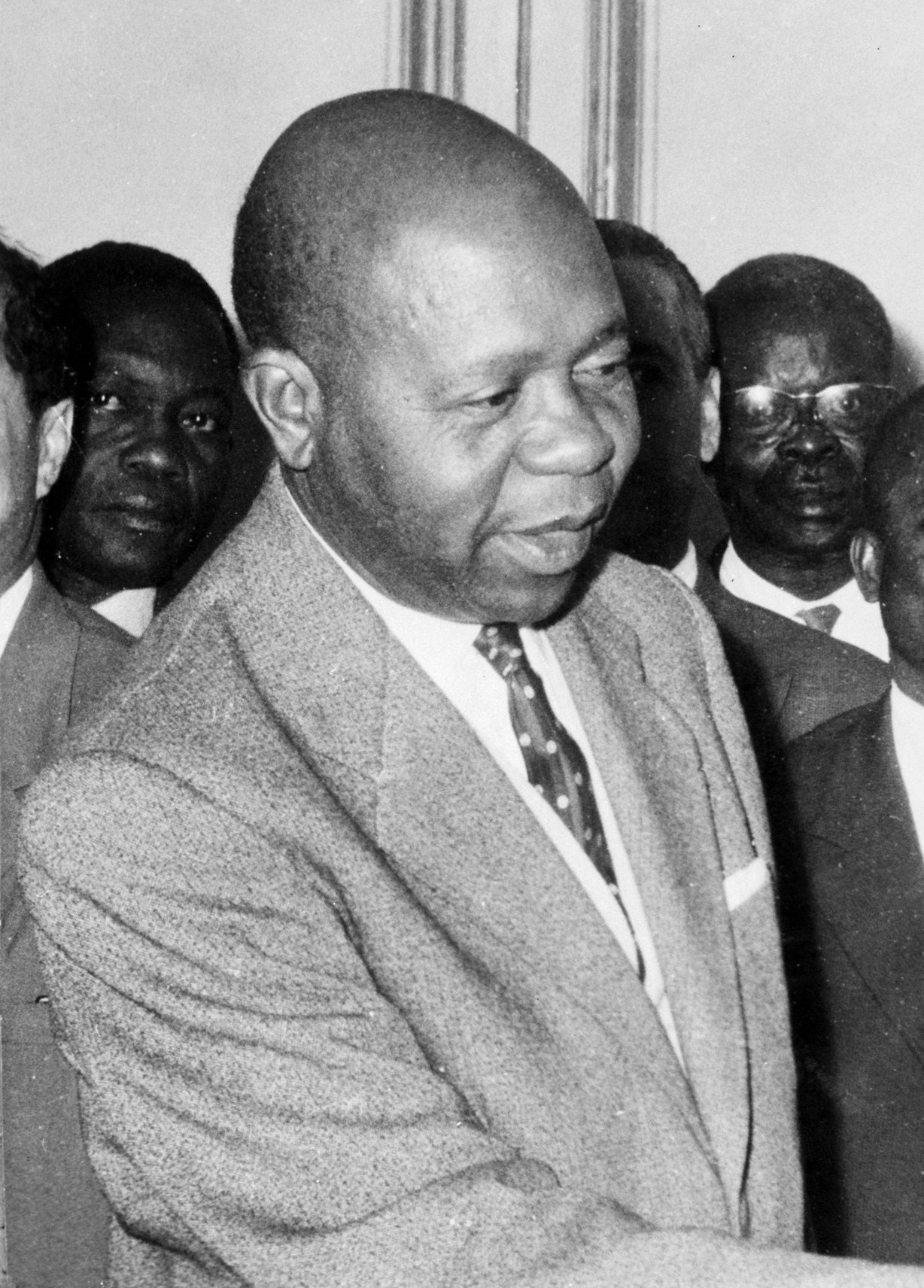
Léon M'ba

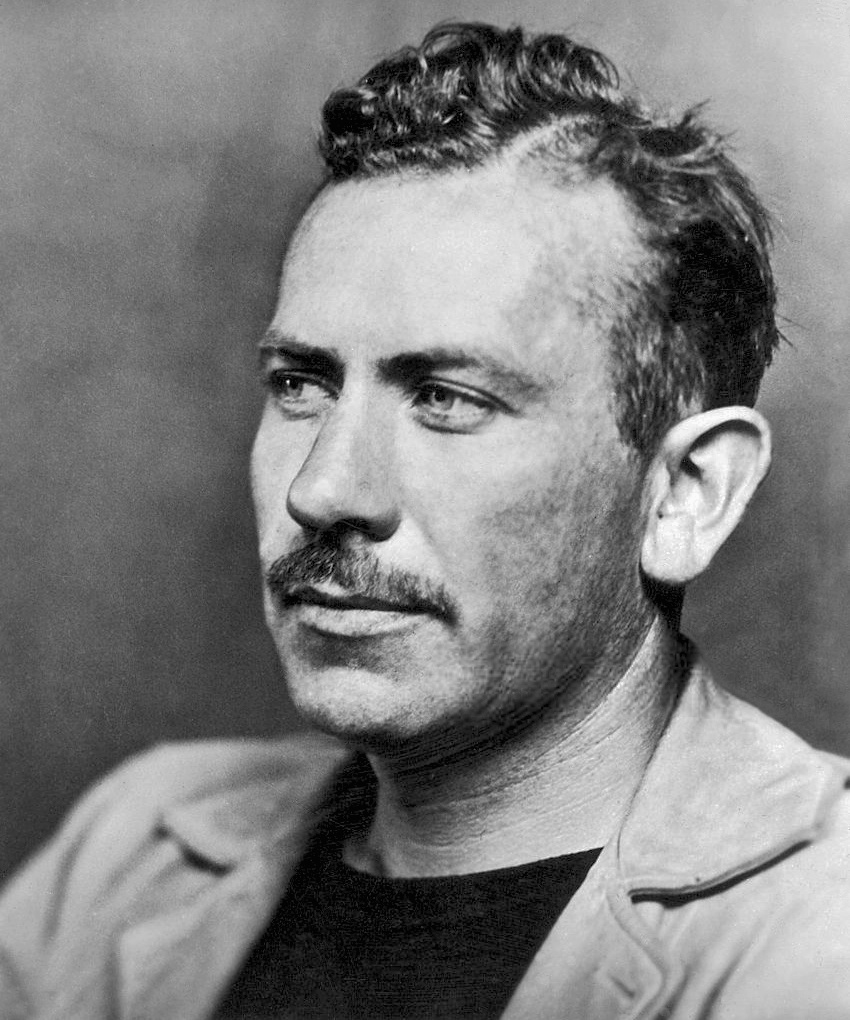
John Steinbeck

- February 4
  - Charles Lindbergh, American aviator (d. 1974)
  - Hartley Shawcross, British barrister and politician (d. 2003)
- February 8 – Demchugdongrub, Mongolian politician (d. 1966)
- February 9
  - Blanche Calloway, American jazz singer (d. 1978)
  - Léon M'ba, 1st President of Gabon (d. 1967)
- February 10 – Walter Houser Brattain, American physicist, Nobel Prize laureate (d. 1987)
- February 11 – Arne Jacobsen, Danish architect, designer (d. 1971)
- February 12 – William Collier Jr., American actor (d. 1987)
- February 14 – Thelma Ritter, American actress (d. 1969)
- February 19
  - Kay Boyle, American writer (d. 1992)
  - John W. Bubbles, American dancer and actor (d. 1986)
- February 20 – Ansel Adams, American photographer (d. 1984)
- February 22 – Herma Szabo, Austrian figure skater (d. 1986)
- February 27
  - Gene Sarazen, American golfer (d. 1999)
  - John Steinbeck, American writer, Nobel Prize laureate (d. 1968)

=== March ===
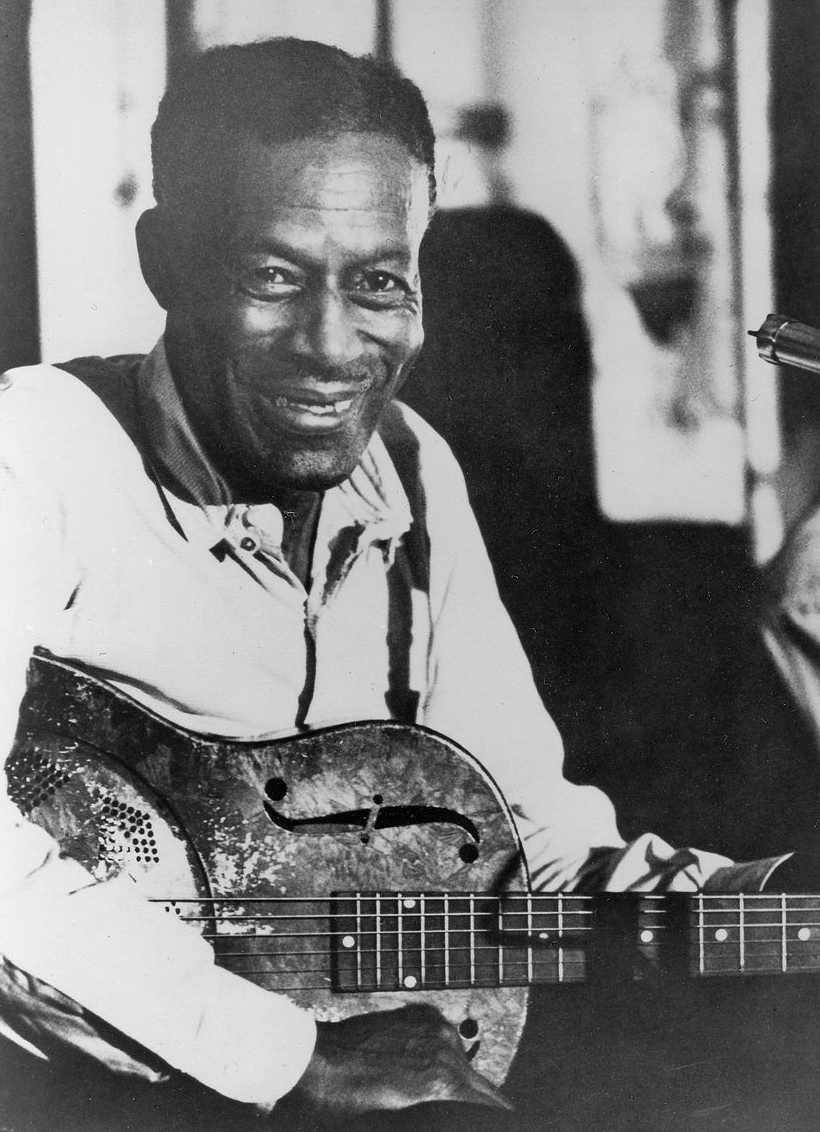
Son House

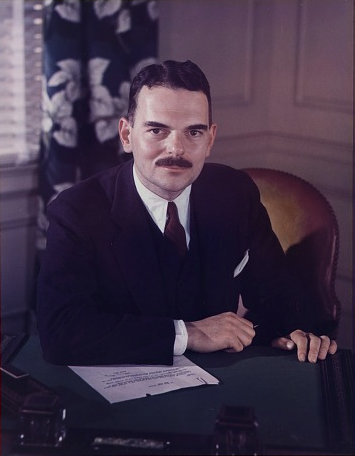
Thomas E. Dewey

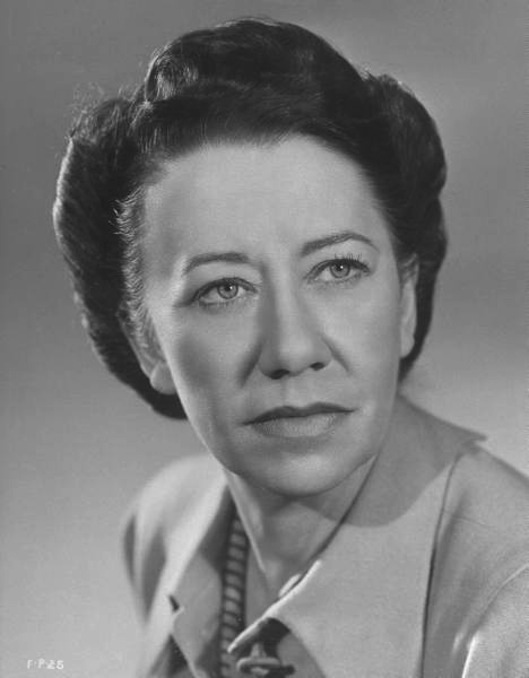
Dame Flora Robson

- March 7 – Heinz Rühmann, German actor (d. 1994)
- March 9 – Will Geer, American actor (d. 1978)
- March 13 – Mohammed Abdel Wahab, Egyptian singer (d. 1991)
- March 17 – Bobby Jones, American golfer (d. 1971)
- March 19 – Fuad Chehab, 8th President of Lebanon (d. 1973)
- March 21 – Son House, American musician (d. 1988)
- March 24 – Thomas E. Dewey, American politician (d. 1971)
- March 27 – Betty Balfour, English screen actress (d. 1977)
- March 28 – Dame Flora Robson, English actress (d. 1984)
- March 29
  - Marcel Aymé, French writer (d. 1967)
  - William Walton, English composer (d. 1983)
- March 30 – Brooke Astor, American socialite, philanthropist (d. 2007)

=== April ===
- April 2 – Jan Tschichold, German typographer (d. 1974)
- April 4
  - Louise Lévêque de Vilmorin, French author (d. 1969)
  - Stanley G. Weinbaum, American science-fiction author (d. 1935)
- April 8
  - Andrew Irvine, British mountaineer (d. 1924)
  - Josef Krips, Austrian conductor, violinist (d. 1974)
- April 12 – Louis Beel, Prime Minister of the Netherlands (d. 1977)
- April 14 – Yakov Smushkevich, Soviet Air Force general (d. 1941)
- April 18 – Giuseppe Pella, Prime Minister of Italy (d. 1981)
- April 20 – Sir Donald Wolfit, English actor (d. 1968)
- April 23 – Halldór Laxness, Icelandic writer, Nobel Prize laureate (d. 1998)
- April 30 – Theodore Schultz, American economist, Nobel Prize laureate (d. 1998)

=== May ===
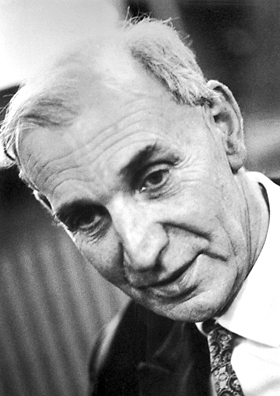
Alfred Kastler

- May 2 – Brian Aherne, English actor (d. 1986)
- May 3 – Alfred Kastler, French physicist, recipient of the Nobel Prize (d. 1984)
- May 6 – Max Ophüls, German film director (d. 1957)
- May 8 – André Michel Lwoff, French microbiologist, recipient of the Nobel Prize in Physiology or Medicine (d. 1994)
- May 10
  - Anatole Litvak, Ukrainian-born film director (d. 1974)
  - David O. Selznick, American film producer (d. 1965)
- May 15 – Richard J. Daley, American politician, 48th Mayor of Chicago (d. 1976)
- May 18 – Meredith Willson, American composer (d. 1984)
- May 21
  - Marcel Breuer, Hungarian-born American architect (d. 1981)
  - Leonidas Zervas, Greek organic chemist (d. 1980)
- May 22 – Al Simmons, American baseball player (d. 1956)

=== June ===
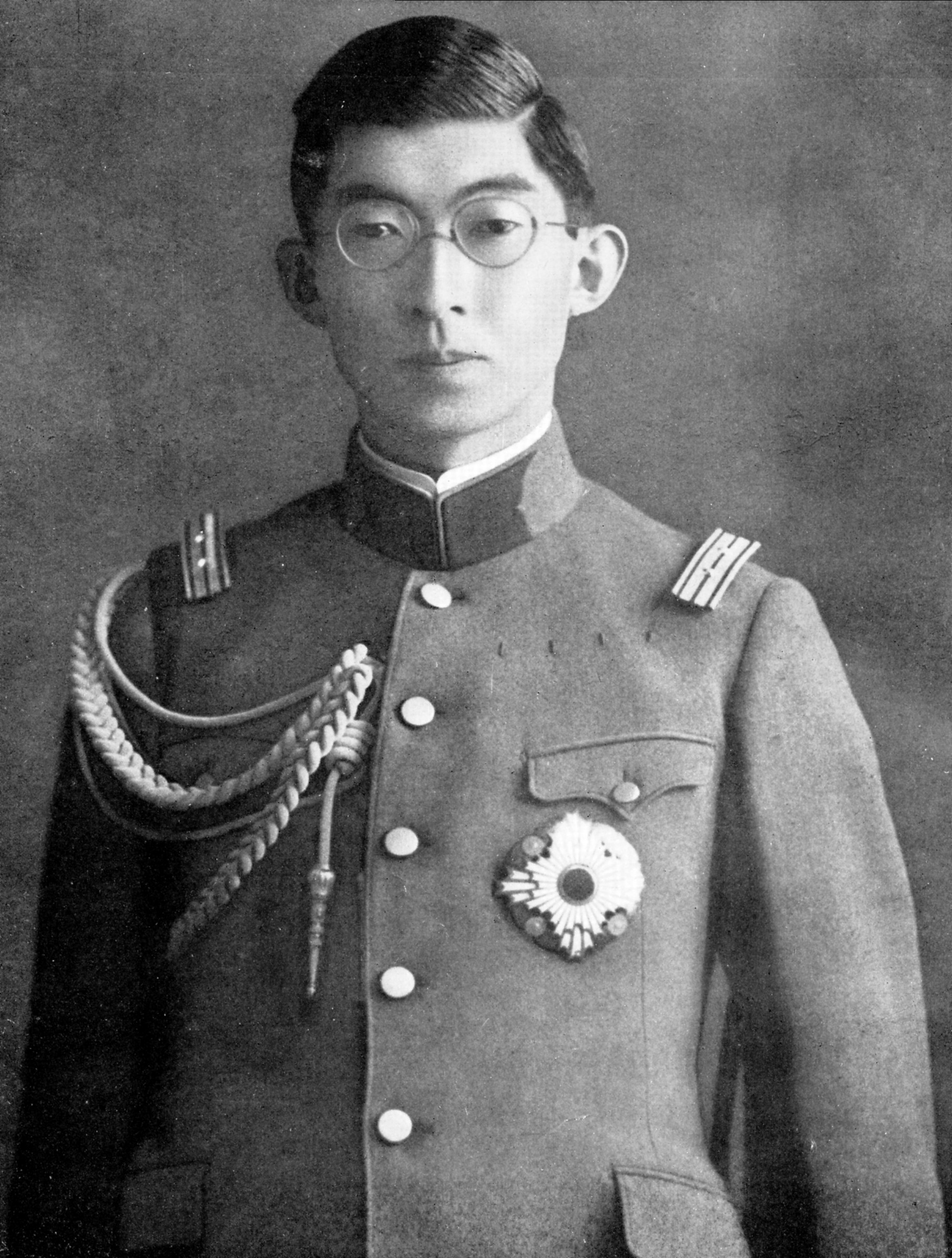
Yasuhito, Prince Chichibu

- June 1 – C. Wade McClusky, United States Navy admiral (d. 1976)
- June 8 – James Stillman Rockefeller, American Olympic rower and banker (d. 2004)
- June 9 – Skip James, American Delta blues singer, songwriter, and musician (d. 1969)
- June 16 – Barbara McClintock, American geneticist, recipient of the Nobel Prize in Physiology or Medicine (d. 1992)
- June 17 – F. F. E. Yeo-Thomas, English World War II hero (d. 1964)
- June 22 – Henri Deglane, French wrestler (d. 1975)
- June 25 – Yasuhito, Prince Chichibu, Japanese prince (d. 1953)
- June 26 – Hugues Cuénod, Swiss tenor (d. 2010)
- June 28 – Richard Rodgers, American composer (d. 1979)

=== July ===
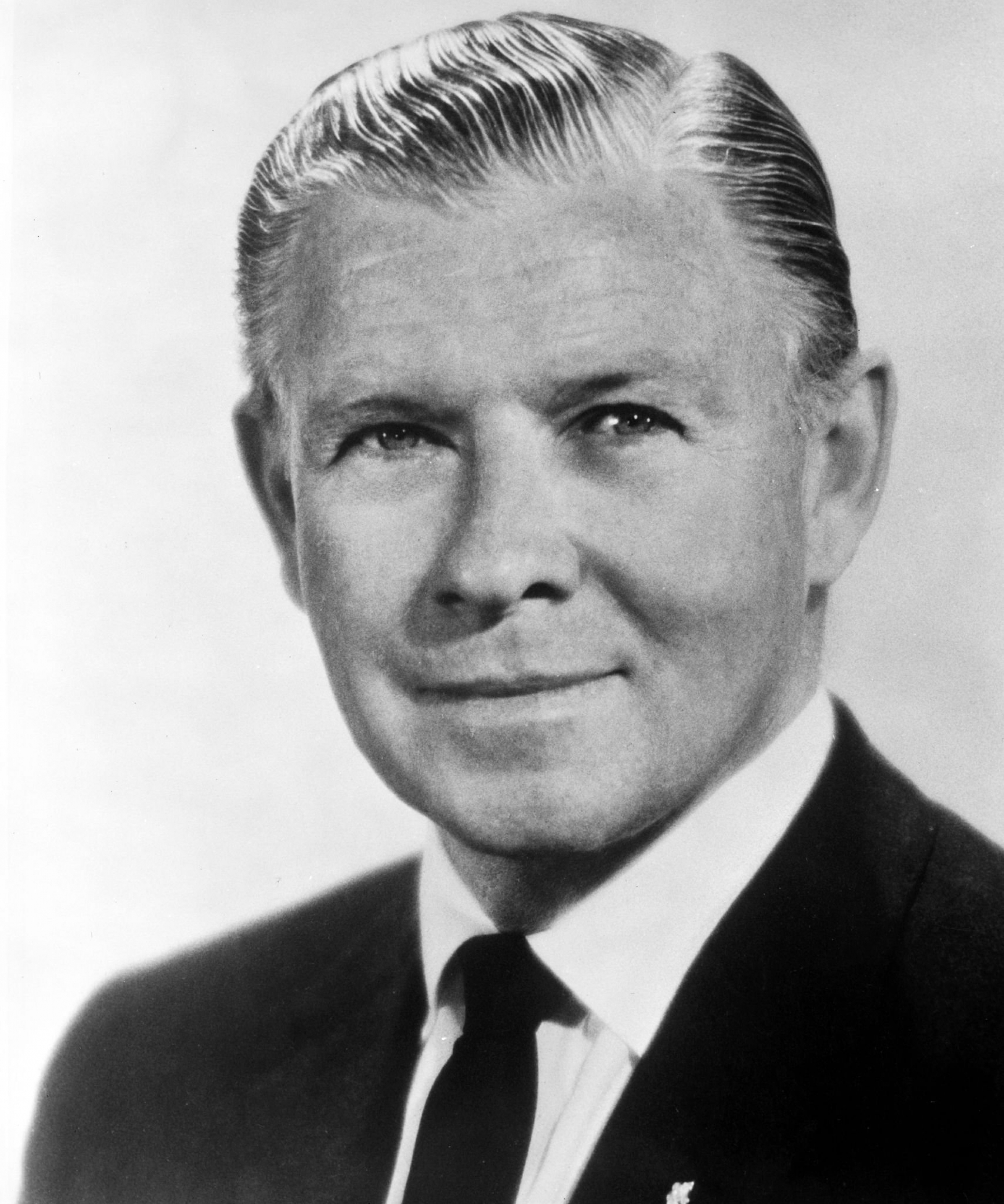
George Murphy

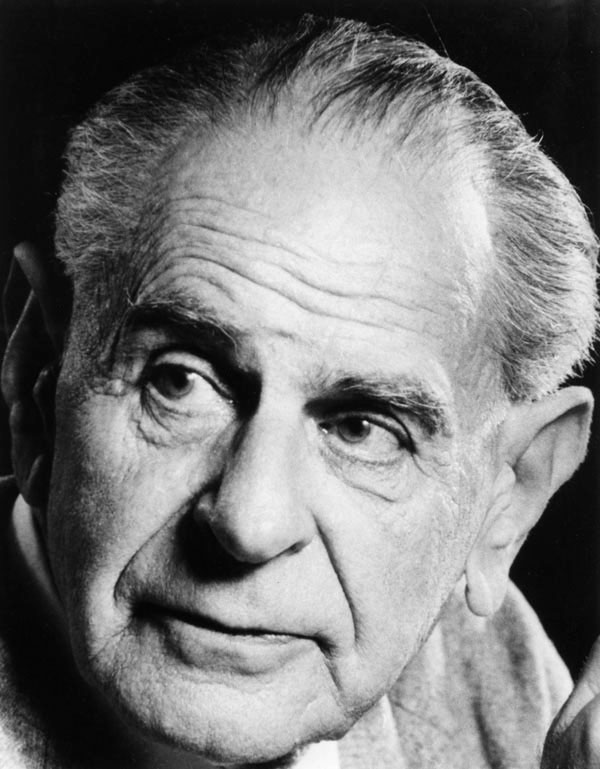
Sir Karl Popper

- July 1 – William Wyler, German-born American film director (d. 1981)
- July 4
  - Meyer Lansky, Russian-born American mobster (d. 1983)
  - George Murphy, American dancer, actor and politician (d. 1992)
- July 8 – Gwendolyn B. Bennett, American writer (d. 1981)
- July 10
  - Kurt Alder, German chemist, Nobel Prize laureate (d. 1958)
  - Nicolás Guillén, Cuban poet, journalist, political activist and writer (d. 1989)
- July 16 – Alexander Luria, Russian neuropsychologist (d. 1977)
- July 18 – Chill Wills, American actor, singer (d. 1978)
- July 28
  - Albert Namatjira, Australian painter (d. 1959)
  - Karl Popper, Austrian-born British philosopher (d. 1994)
- July 31 – Gubby Allen, Australian-born English cricketer, cricket administrator (d. 1989)

=== August ===
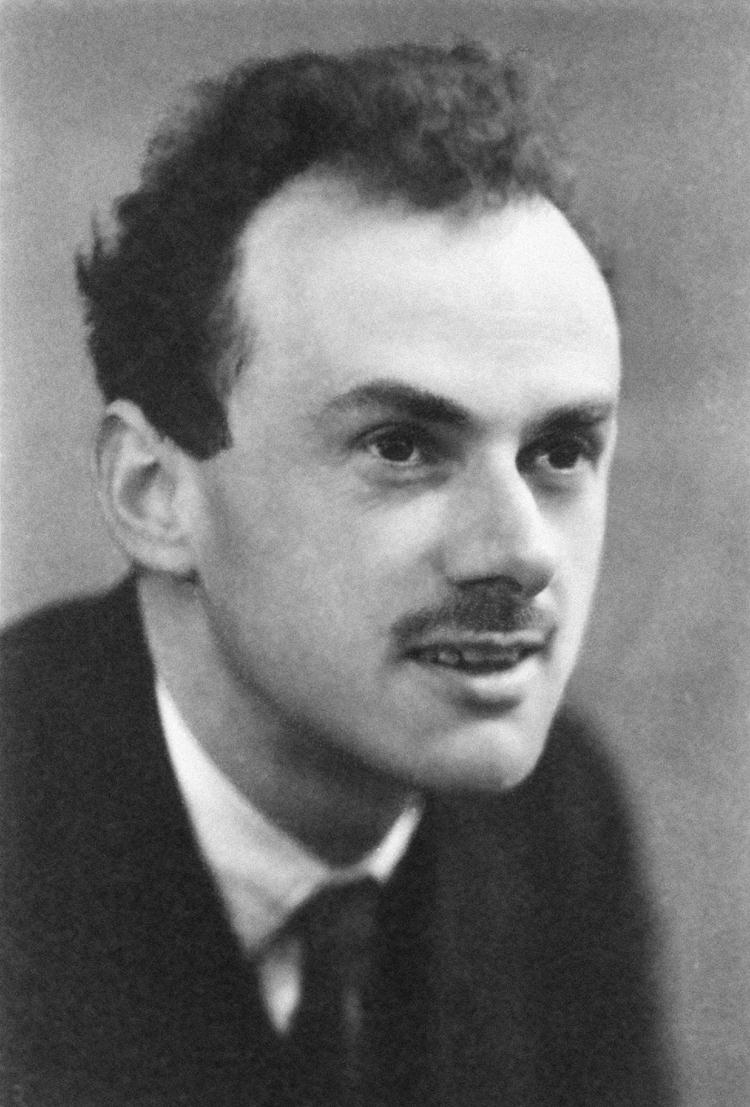
Paul Dirac

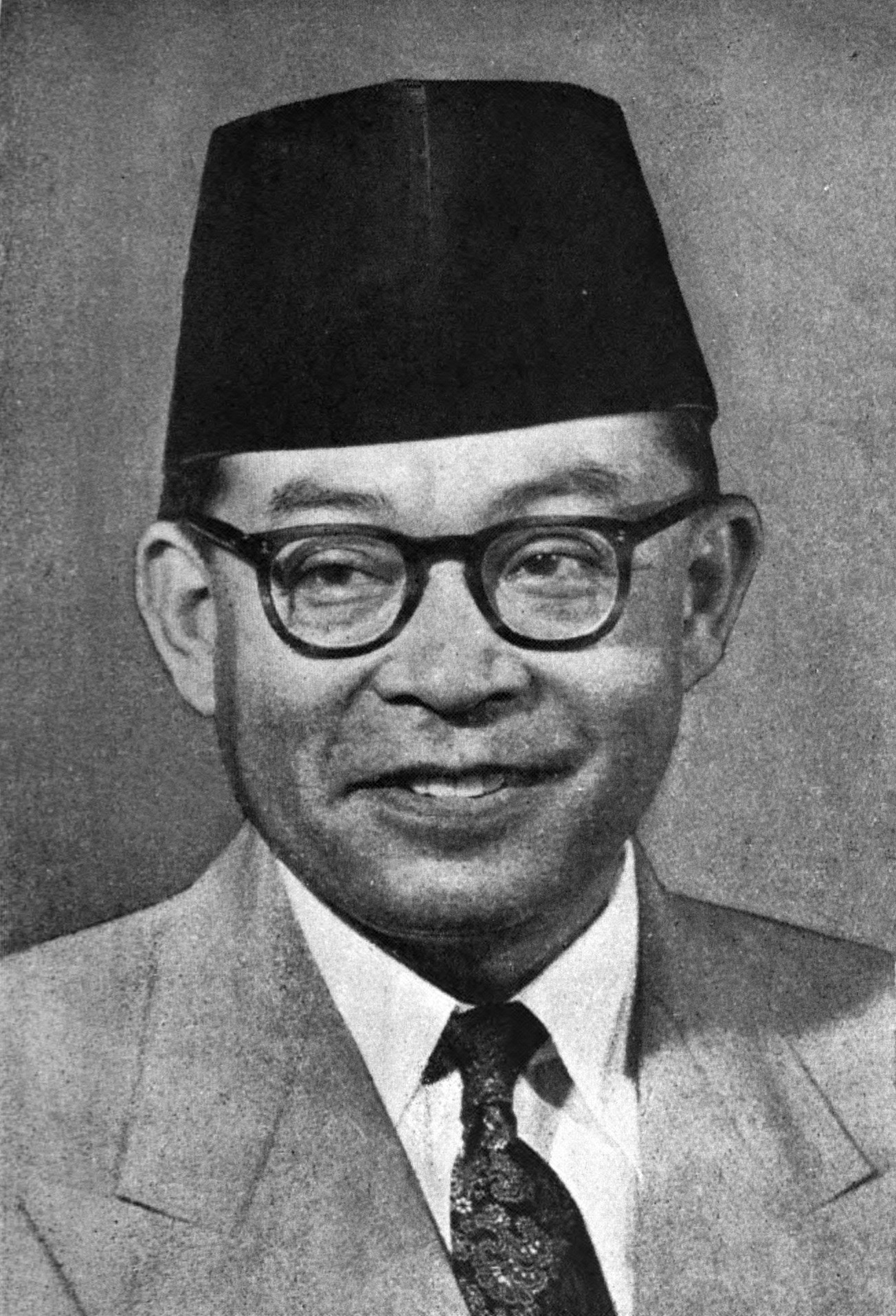
Mohammad Hatta

- August 2 – Pope Cyril VI of Alexandria, Egyptian Coptic Orthodox patriarch (d. 1971)
- August 7 – Ann Harding, American actress (d. 1981)
- August 8 – Paul Dirac, English physicist, Nobel Prize laureate (d. 1984)
- August 10 – Arne Tiselius, Swedish chemist, Nobel Prize laureate (d. 1971)
- August 11
  - Alfredo Binda, Italian cyclist (d. 1986)
  - Lloyd Nolan, American film, television actor (d. 1985)
  - Norma Shearer, Canadian actress (d. 1983)
- August 12 – Mohammad Hatta, 1st Vice President of Indonesia (d. 1980)
- August 13 – Felix Wankel, German mechanical engineer (d. 1988)
- August 16 – Georgette Heyer, British writer (d. 1974)
- August 19
  - Ogden Nash, American poet (d. 1971)
  - J. B. L. Reyes, Filipino jurist (d. 1994)
- August 22 – Leni Riefenstahl, German film director (d. 2003)
- August 24 – Carlo Gambino, Italian-born American gangster (d. 1976)
- August 25 – Stefan Wolpe, German-born American composer (d. 1972)

=== September ===
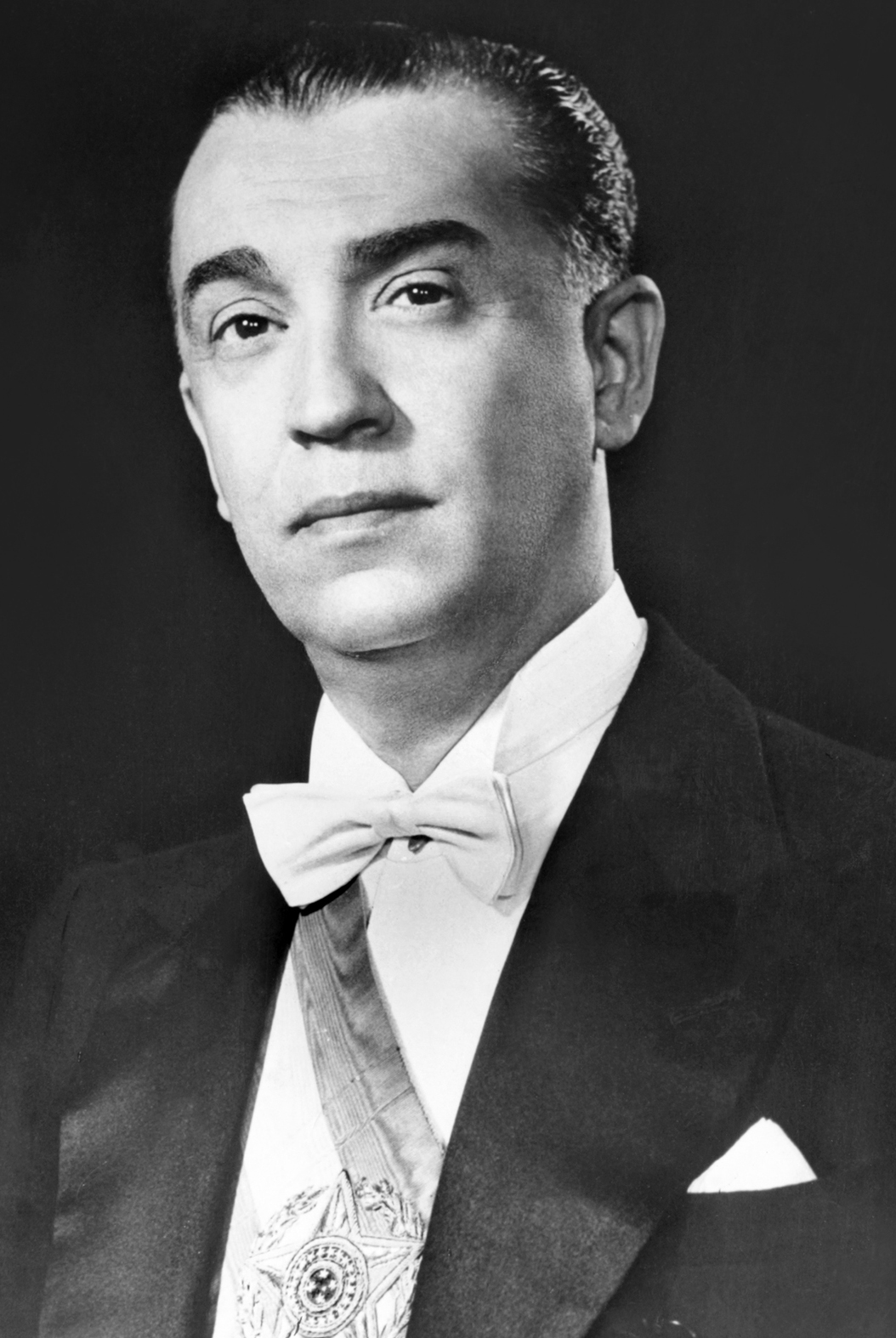
Juscelino Kubitschek

- September 5 – Darryl F. Zanuck, American film producer and studio executive (d. 1979)
- September 6 – Sylvanus Olympio, Togolese politician, 1st President of Togo (assassinated) (d. 1963)
- September 9 – Roberto Noble, Argentine politician, journalist and publisher (d. 1969)
- September 12 – Juscelino Kubitschek, 21st President of Brazil (d. 1976)
- September 21
  - Luis Cernuda, Spanish poet (d. 1963)
  - Ilmari Salminen, Finnish athlete (d. 1986)
- September 22 – John Houseman, Romanian-born actor, producer (d. 1988)
- September 23 – Ion Gheorghe Maurer, Romanian lawyer and politician, 49th Prime Minister of Romania (d. 2000)
- September 24 – Ruhollah Khomeini, Iranian Shia cleric, 1st Supreme Leader of Iran (d. 1989)
- September 26 – Albert Anastasia, Italian-born American gangster (d. 1957)

=== October ===
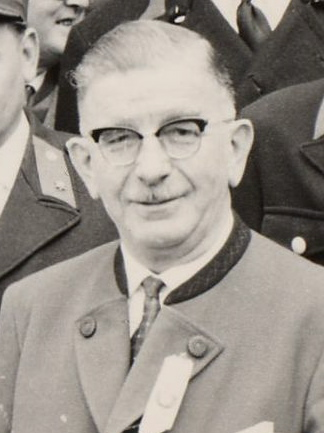
Leopold Figl

- October 2 – Leopold Figl, 14th Chancellor of Austria (d. 1965)
- October 5
  - Larry Fine, American actor and comedian (The Three Stooges) (d. 1975)
  - Ray Kroc, American fast food entrepreneur (McDonald's) (d. 1984)
- October 18
  - Miriam Hopkins, American actress (d. 1972)
  - Pascual Jordan, German physicist (d. 1980)
- October 25
  - Carlo Gnocchi, Italian Roman Catholic priest and blessed (d. 1956)
  - Eddie Lang, American jazz guitarist (d. 1933)
- October 26 – Jack Sharkey, Lithuanian-born American heavyweight boxing champion (d. 1994)
- October 28 – Elsa Lanchester, British-American actress (d. 1986)
- October 31 – Carlos Drummond de Andrade, Brazilian poet (d. 1987)

=== November ===
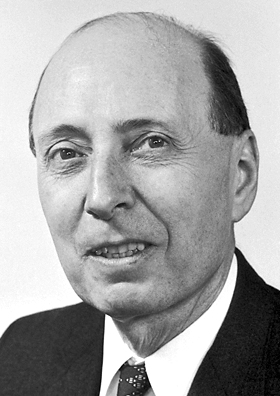
Eugene Wigner

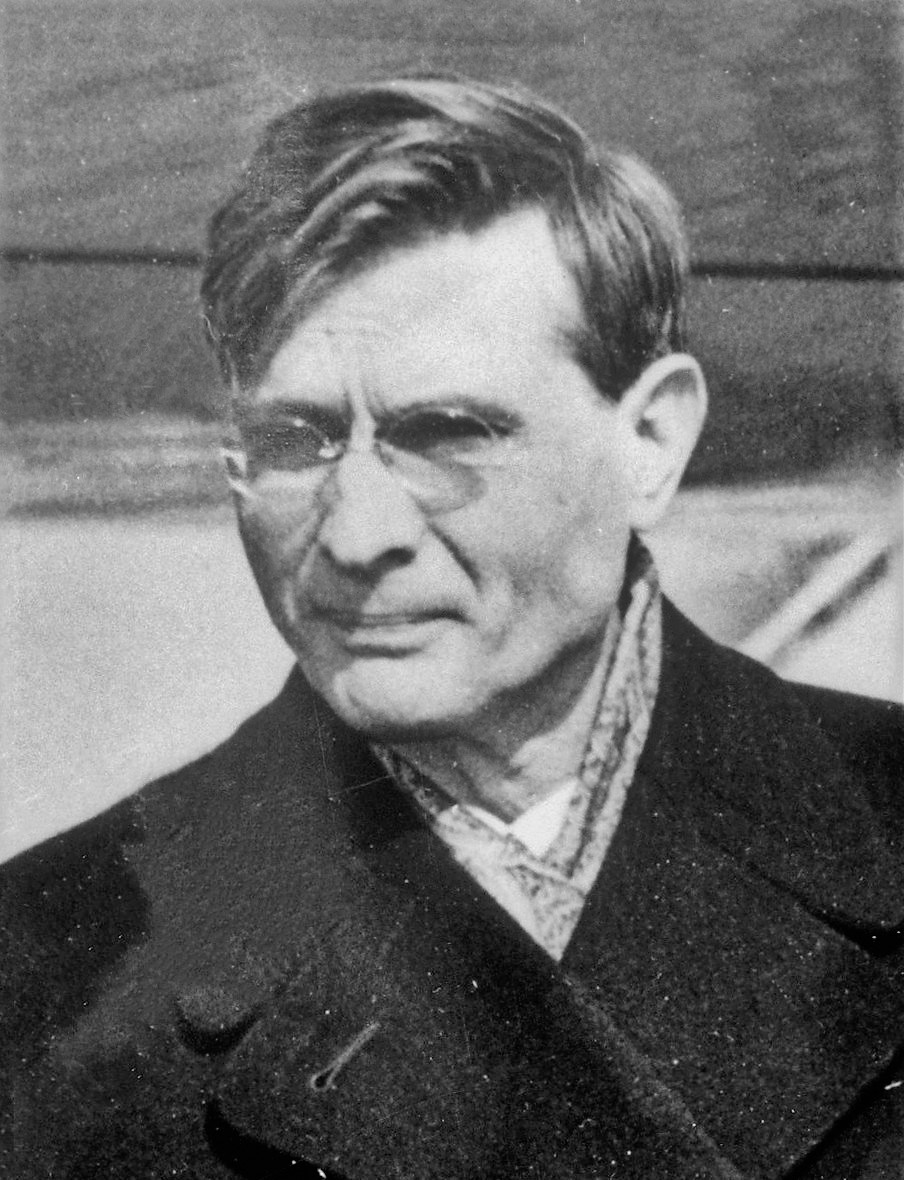
Mikhail Suslov

- November 1 – Eugen Jochum, German conductor (d. 1987)
- November 2
  - Princess Mafalda of Savoy (d. 1944)
  - Prince Rostislav Alexandrovich of Russia (d. 1978)
- November 9 – Anthony Asquith, British film director (d. 1968)
- November 17 – Eugene Wigner, Hungarian physicist, Nobel Prize laureate (d. 1995)
- November 21 – Mikhail Suslov, Soviet politician (d. 1982)
- November 22 – Philippe Leclerc de Hauteclocque, French general (d. 1947)
- November 23 – Victor Jory, Canadian actor (d. 1982)
- November 30 – Hussein ibn Nasser, 8th Prime Minister of Jordan (d. 1982)

=== December ===
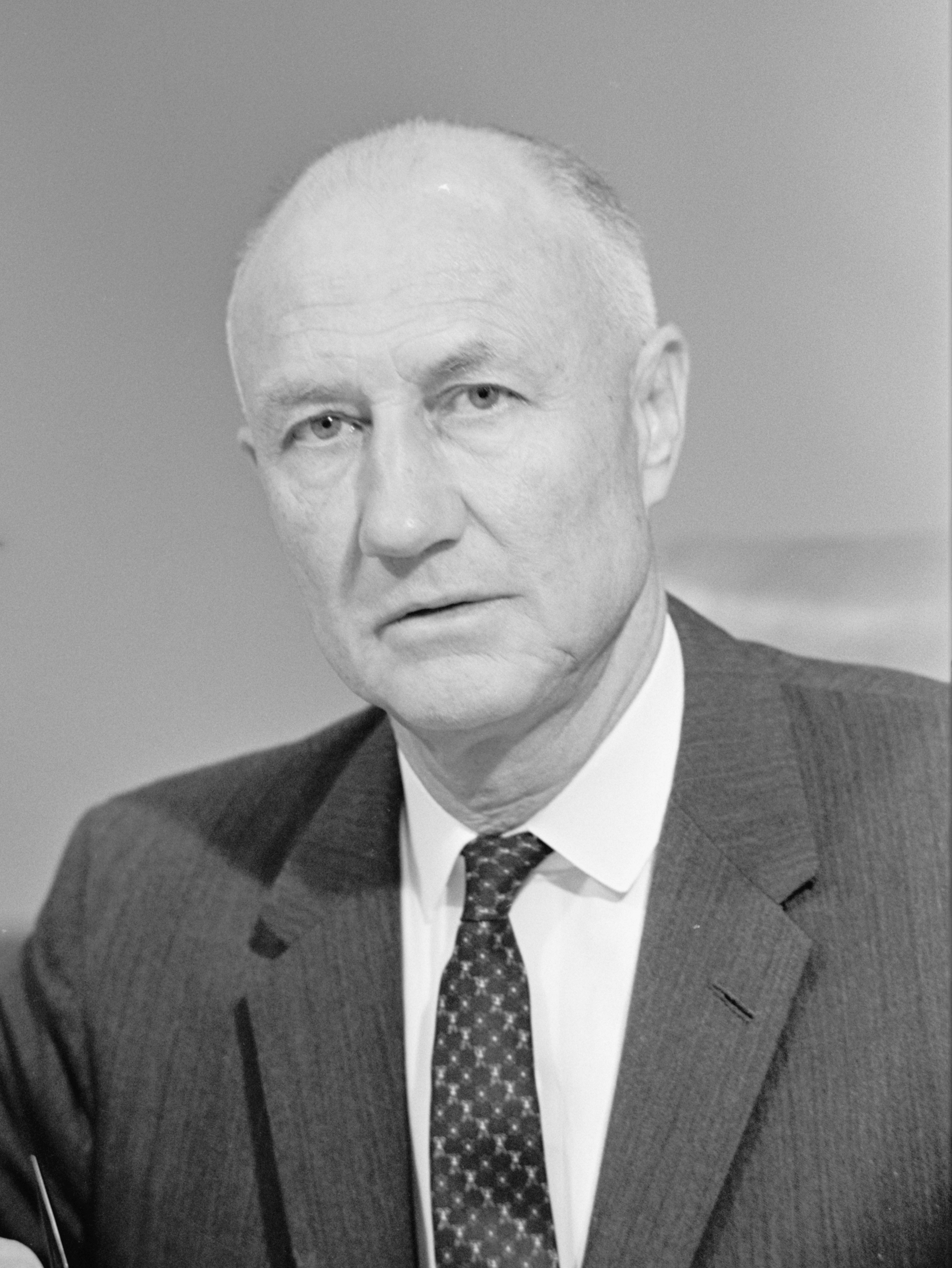
Strom Thurmond

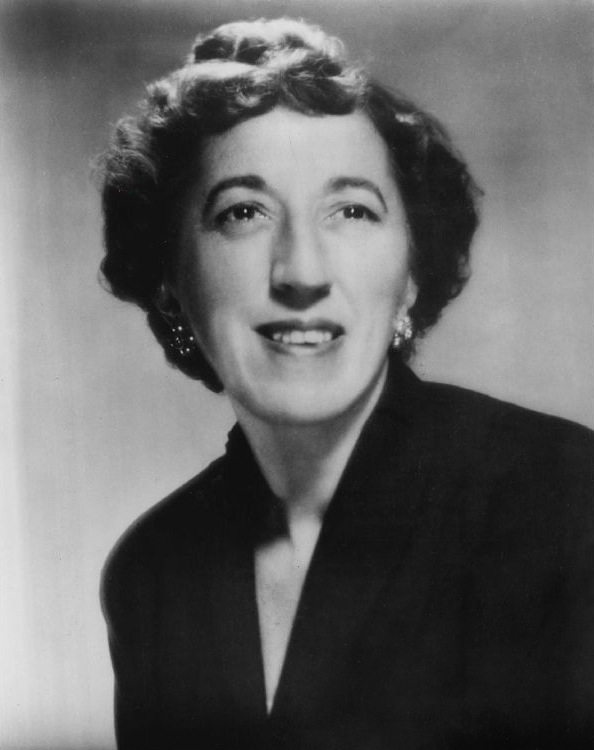
Margaret Hamilton

- December 1 – Trần Văn Hương, South Vietnamese politician, 3rd President of South Vietnam, 3rd Vice President of South Vietnam, and 3rd Prime Minister of South Vietnam (d. 1982)
- December 2 – Wifredo Lam, Cuban artist (d. 1982)
- December 3 – Mitsuo Fuchida, Japanese aviator, naval officer, and Christian evangelist (d. 1976)
- December 5
  - Emeric Pressburger, Hungarian-born British film director (d. 1988)
  - Strom Thurmond, American politician (d. 2003)
- December 9 – Margaret Hamilton, American actress (d. 1985)
- December 14 – Frances Bavier, American stage and television actress (d. 1989)
- December 19 – Ralph Richardson, English actor (d. 1983)
- December 20 – Prince George, Duke of Kent (d. 1942)
- December 23
  - Norman Maclean, American author (d. 1990)
  - Charan Singh, 5th Prime Minister of India (d. 1987)
- December 25 – Barton MacLane, American actor (d. 1969)
- December 28
  - Mortimer J. Adler, American philosopher (d. 2001)
  - Shen Congwen, Chinese writer (d. 1988)

=== Date unknown ===
- Nazem Akkari, 19th Prime Minister of Lebanon (d. 1985)

== Deaths ==
=== January–June ===
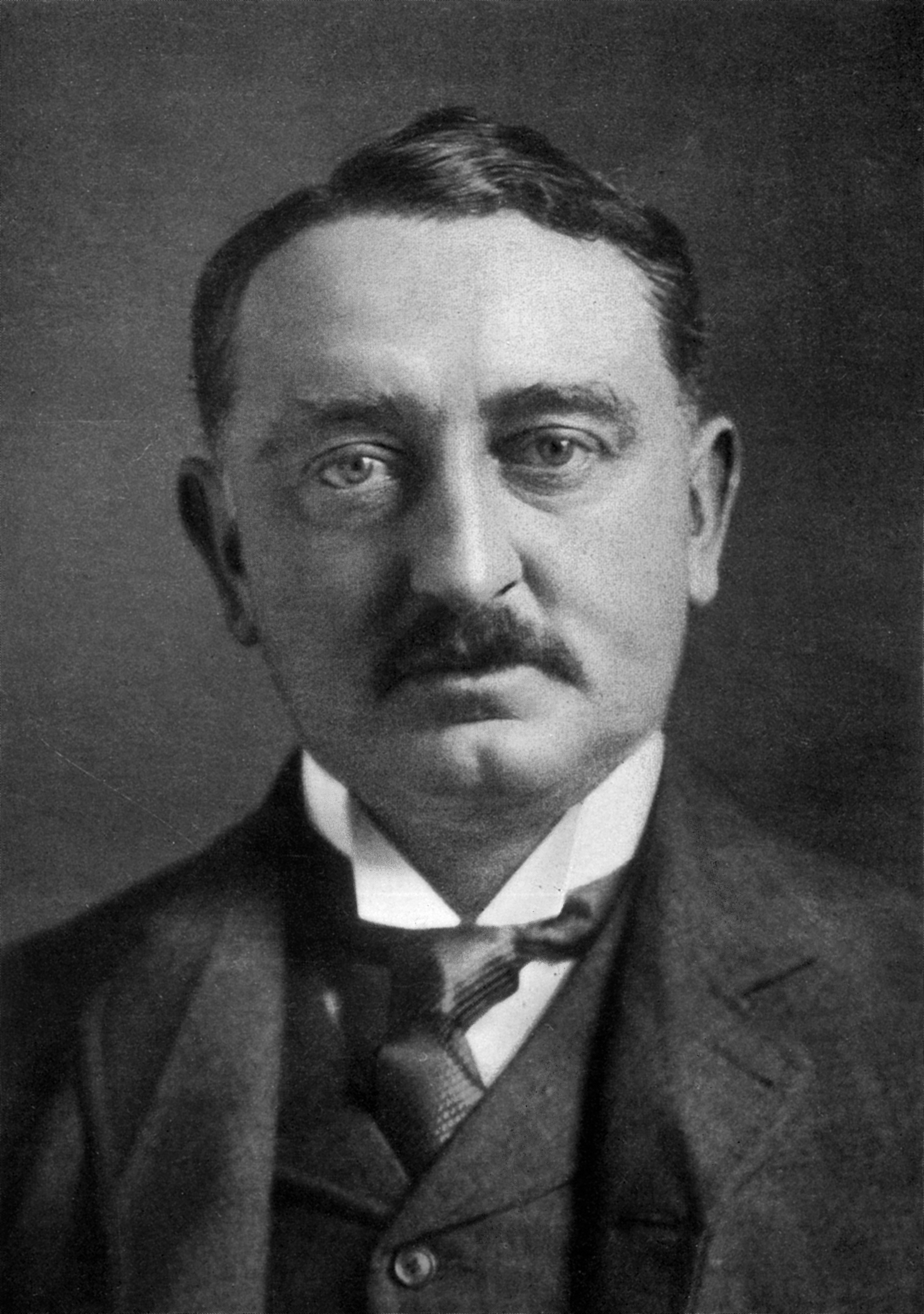
Cecil Rhodes

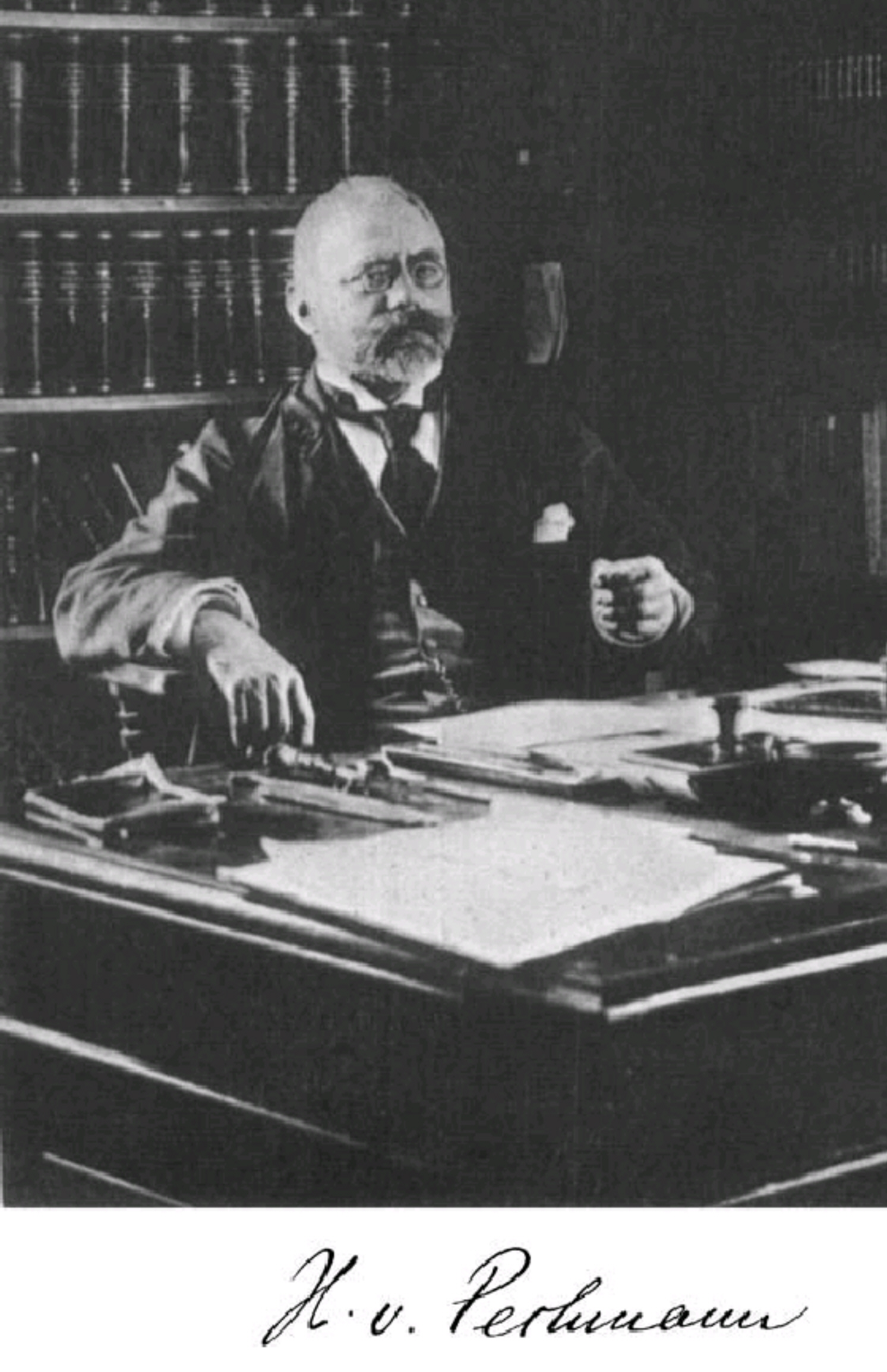
Hans von Pechmann

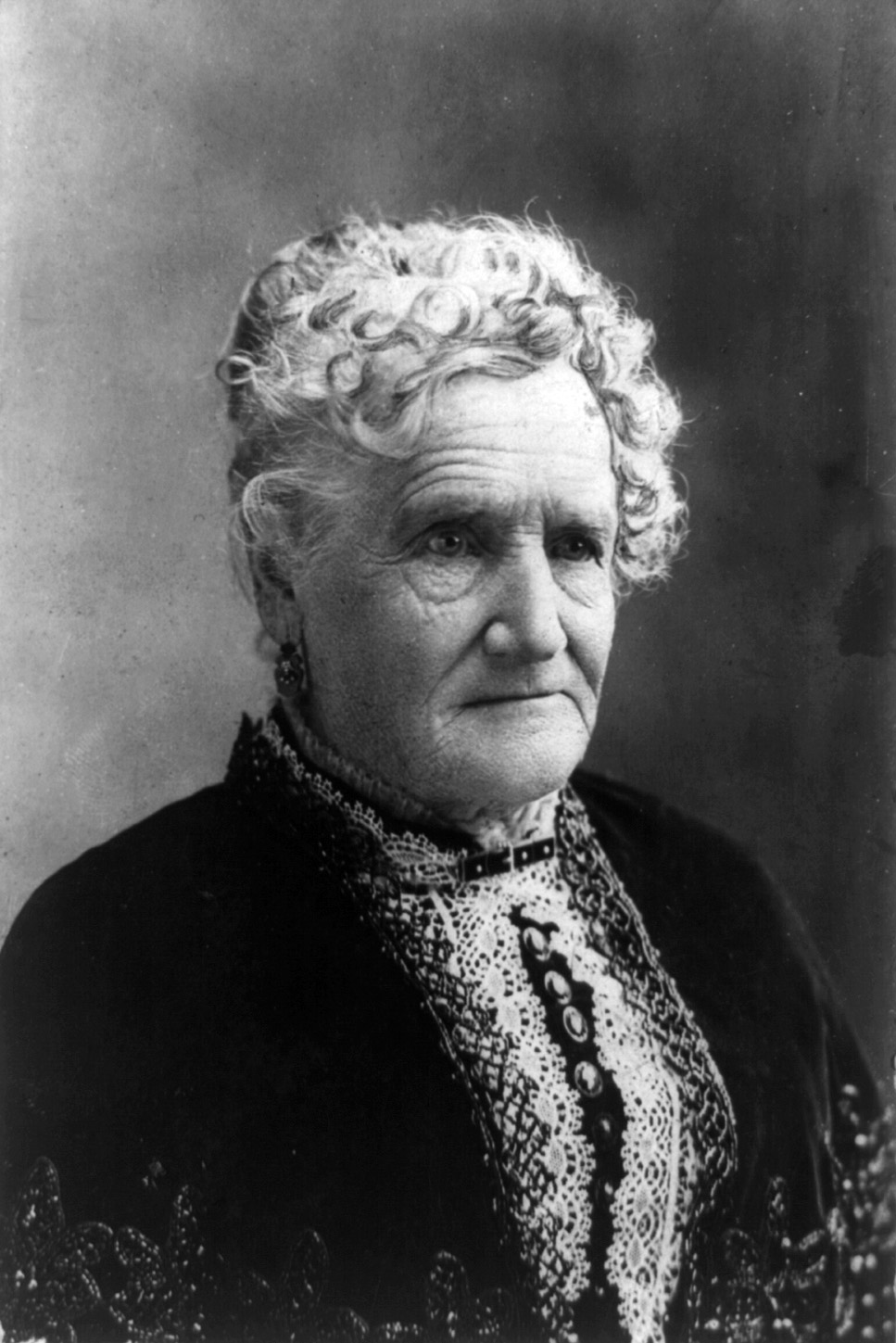
Esther Hobart Morris

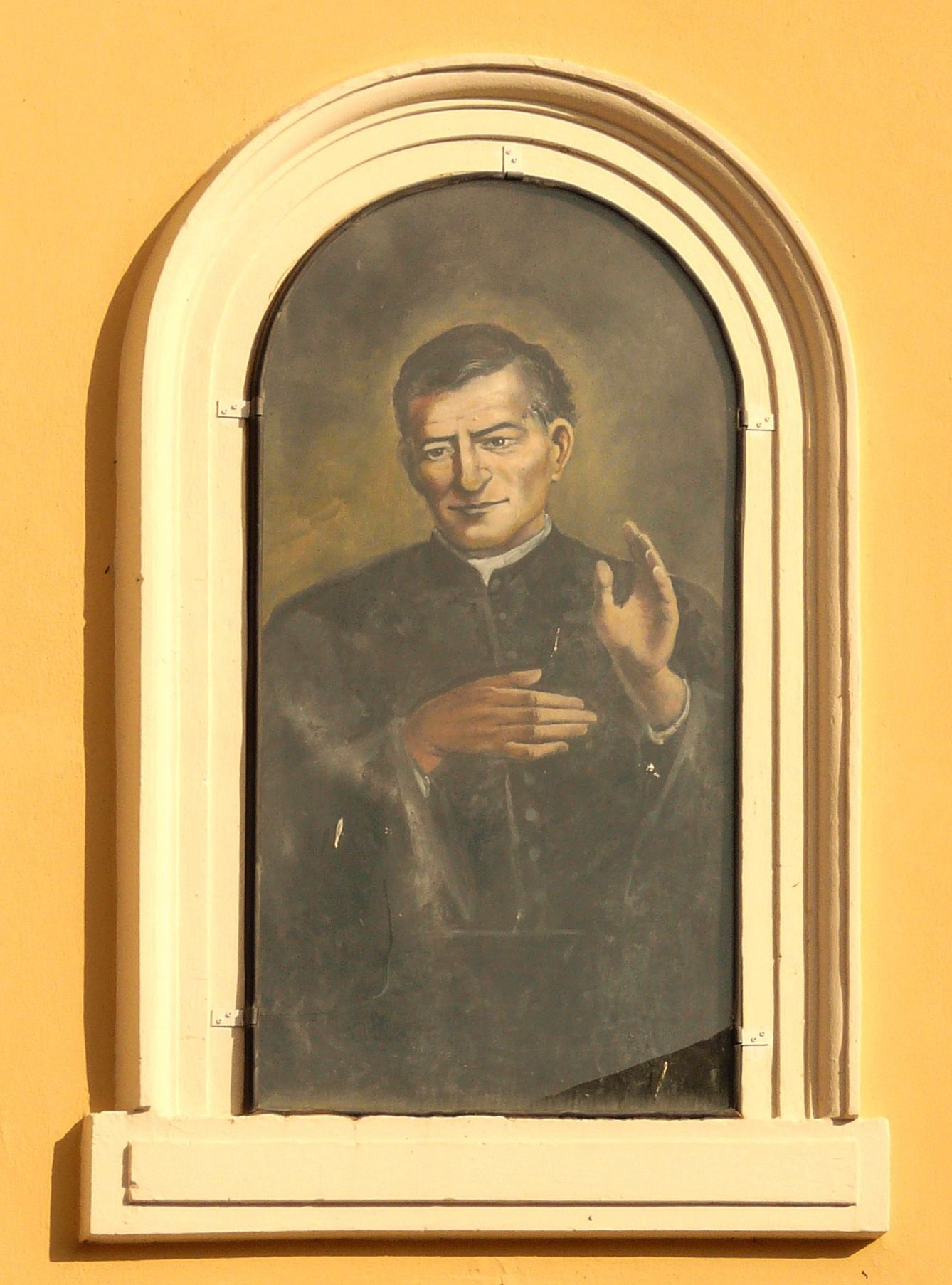
Saint Agostino Roscelli

- January 5 – Martis Karin Ersdotter, Swedish businesswoman (born 1829)
- January 11 – Johnny Briggs, English cricketer (b. 1862)
- January 30 – François Claude du Barail, French general and Minister of War (b. 1820)
- February 6 – Clémence Royer, French scholar (b. 1830)
- February 15 – Viggo Hørup, Danish politician (b. 1841)
- February 18 – Albert Bierstadt, German-born American painter (b. 1830)
- February 26 – Edward Henry Cooper, British army officer and politician (b. 1827)
- February 27
  - Breaker Morant, Australian soldier (executed) (b. 1864)
  - Peter Handcock, Australian soldier (executed) (b. 1869)
- March 3 – Isaäc Dignus Fransen van de Putte, 11th Prime Minister of the Netherlands (b. 1822)
- March 7 – Pud Galvin, American baseball player, MLB Hall of Famer (b. 1856)
- March 11 – Friedrich Engelhorn, German industrialist, founder of BASF (b. 1821)
- March 12 – John Peter Altgeld, American politician, 20th Governor of Illinois (b. 1847)
- March 15 – Sir Richard Temple, 1st Baronet, British colonial administrator of India (b. 1826)
- March 23 – Kálmán Tisza, Hungarian politician, former Prime Minister (b. 1830)
- March 26 – Cecil Rhodes, British imperialist (b. 1853)
- March 29 – Sir Andrew Clarke, British army officer and colonial governor (b. 1824)
- April 3 – Esther Hobart Morris, American suffragist judge (b. 1814)
- April 8 – John Wodehouse, 1st Earl of Kimberley, British politician (b. 1826)
- April 11 – Wade Hampton III, Confederate soldier and South Carolina politician (b. 1818)
- April 15 – Jules Dalou, French sculptor (b. 1838)
- April 17 – Francisco de Asís, Duke of Cádiz, former king consort of Spain (b. 1822)
- April 19 – Hans von Pechmann, German chemist (b. 1850)
- April 26 – Lazarus Fuchs, German mathematician (b. 1833)
- April 28 – Sol Smith Russell, American comedian (b. 1848)
- May – Harriet Abbott Lincoln Coolidge, American philanthropist, author and reformer (b. 1849)
- May 5 – Bret Harte, American writer (b. 1836)
- May 6
  - Martha Perry Lowe, American social activist and organizer (b. 1829)
  - William T. Sampson, American admiral (b. 1840)
- May 7 – Agostino Roscelli, Italian priest, founder of the Institute of Sisters of the Immaculata (b. 1818)
- May 25 – Henry Foster, Australian politician (b. 1846)
- May 26 – Almon Brown Strowger, American inventor (b. 1839)
- June 5 – Louis J. Weichmann, American witness to the assassination of Abraham Lincoln (b. 1842)
- June 8 – Charles Ingalls, American pioneer and father of Laura Ingalls Wilder (b. 1836)
- June 10
  - Jacint Verdaguer, Catalan poet (b. 1845)
  - Auguste Schmidt, German educator, activist (b. 1833)
- June 18 – Samuel Butler, British author (b. 1835)
- June 19 – Albert, King of Saxony, member of the House of Wettin (b. 1828)

=== July–December ===
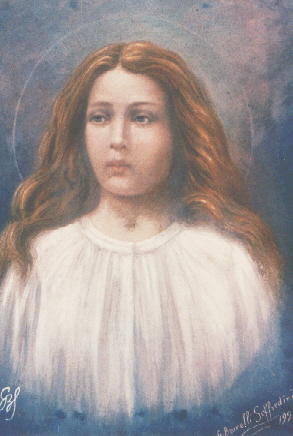
Saint Maria Goretti

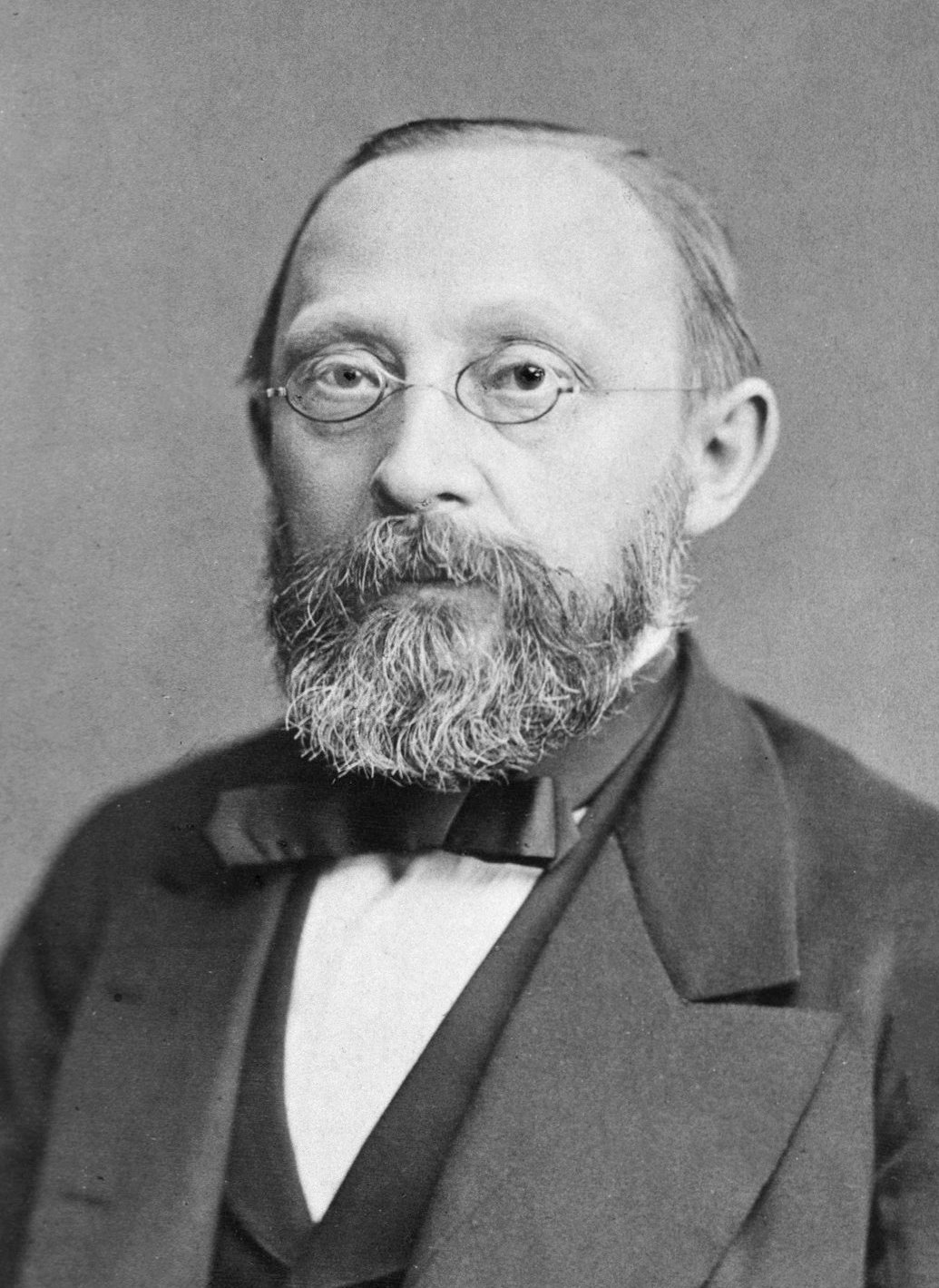
Rudolf Virchow

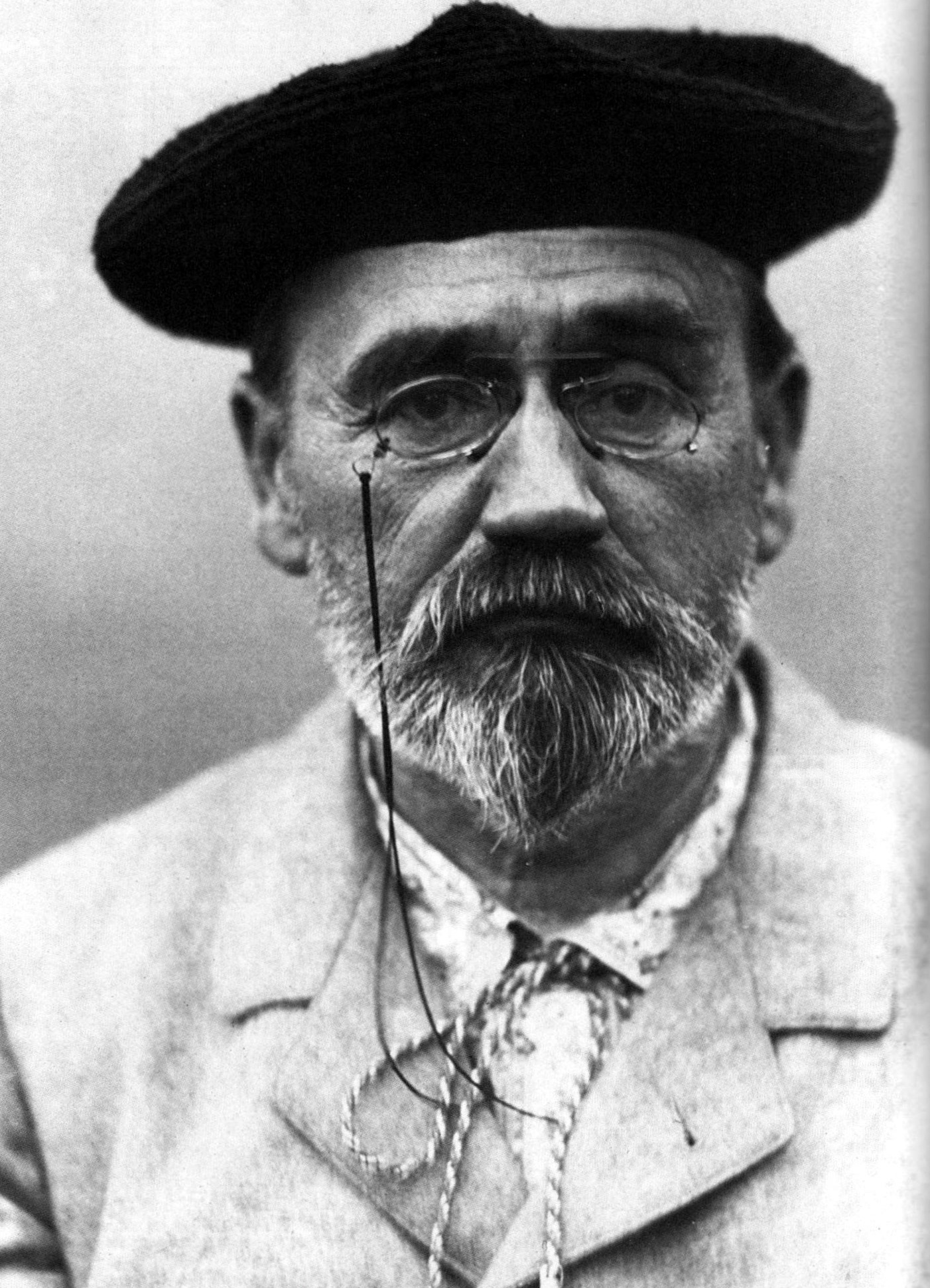
Émile Zola

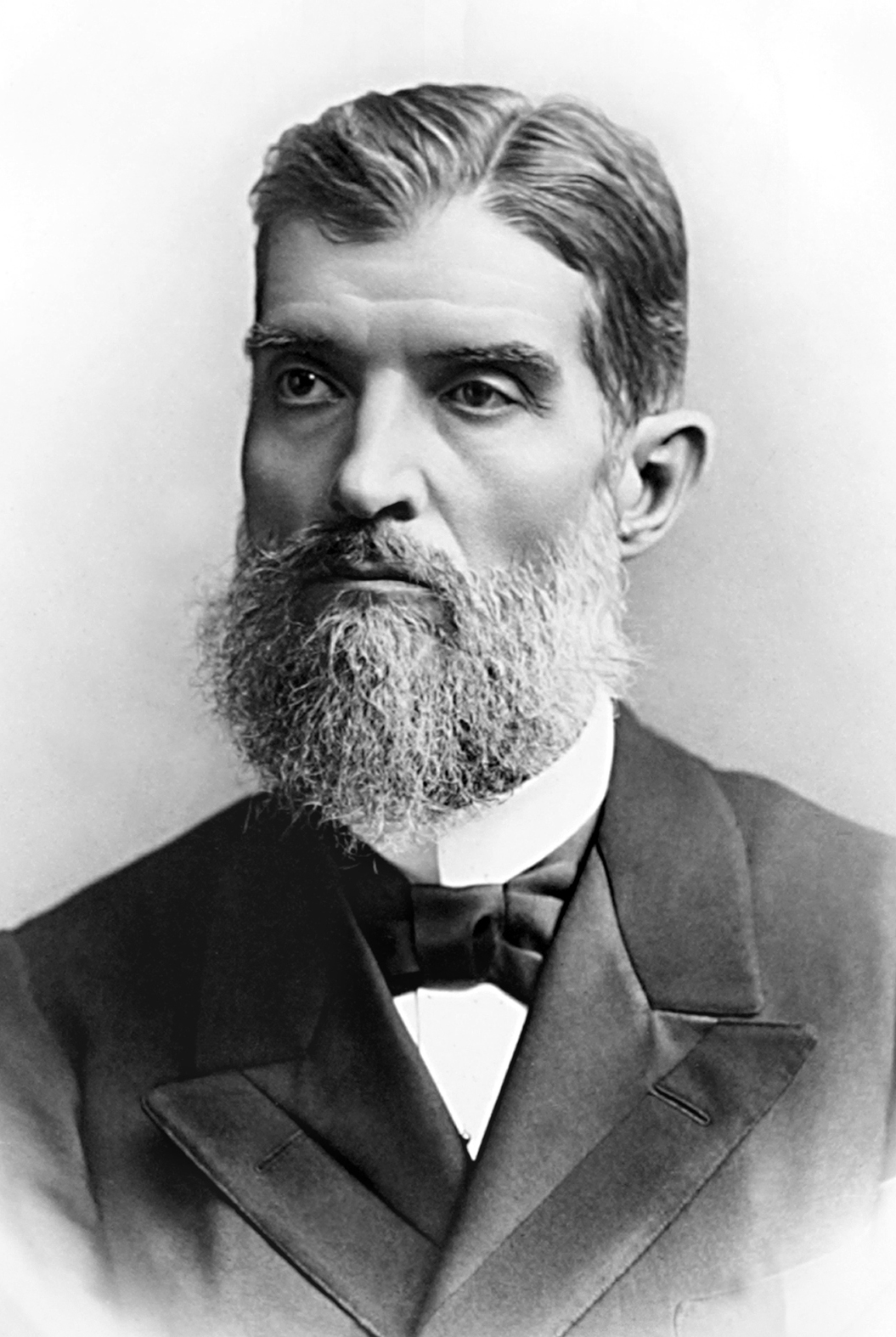
Prudente de Morais

- July 4 – Swami Vivekananda, Indian religious leader (b. 1863)
- July 6 – Maria Goretti, Italian Roman Catholic virgin, martyr and saint (b. 1890)
- July 16 – Henry Dunning Macleod, Scottish economist (b. 1821)
- July 17 – Domenico Morea, Italian priest, educator and historian (b. 1833)
- July 18 – Saigō Jūdō, Japanese general, admiral, and politician (b. 1843)
- July 27 – Gustave Trouvé, French electrical engineer and inventor (b. 1839)
- August 8 – James Tissot, French artist (b. 1836)
- August 31 – Mathilde Wesendonck, German poet (b. 1828)
- September 5 – Rudolf Virchow, German scientist, politician (b. 1821)
- September 6
  - Sir Frederick Abel, British chemist (b. 1827)
  - Hammerton Killick, Haitian admiral (b. 1856)
  - Winfield Scott Stratton, American mining prospector and philanthropist (b. 1848)
- September 7 – William N. Roach, American politician and member of the United States Senate from 1893 to 1899 (b. 1840)
- September 15 – Horace Gray, American jurist (b. 1828)
- September 18 – Thorborg Rappe, Swedish social reformer (b. 1832)
- September 19 – Masaoka Shiki, Japanese haiku poet (b. 1867)
- September 23 – John Wesley Powell, American explorer (b. 1834)
- September 26 – Levi Strauss, German-born American inventor of Levi's Jeans (b. 1829)
- September 28 – John Marks Moore, American politician (b. 1853)
- September 29
  - William McGonagall, Scottish doggerel poet (b. 1825)
  - Émile Zola, French author (b. 1840)
- September 30 – James Edward Jouett, American admiral (b. 1826)
- October 6
  - John Hall Gladstone, British chemist (b. 1827)
  - Liu Kunyi, Chinese general (b. 1830)
- October 25 – Frank Norris, American novelist (b. 1870)
- October 26 – Elizabeth Cady Stanton, American activist (b. 1815)
- November 4 – Hale Johnson, American politician (b. 1847)
- November 17 – Hugh Price Hughes, Welsh social reformer (b. 1847)
- November 22
  - Friedrich Alfred Krupp, German industrialist (b. 1854)
  - Walter Reed, American army physician (b. 1851)
- December 2 – Count Richard Belcredi, former Prime minister of the Austrian Empire (b. 1823)
- December 3
  - Prudente de Morais, 3rd President of Brazil (b. 1841)
  - Robert Lawson, New Zealand architect (b. 1833)
- December 4 – Charles Dow, American journalist, co-founder of Dow Jones & Company (b. 1851)
- December 5 – Johannes Wislicenus, German chemist (b. 1835)
- December 6 – Alice Freeman Palmer, American educator (b. 1855)
- December 7 – Thomas Nast, American caricaturist, cartoonist (b. 1840)
- December 11 – Mary Mathews Adams, Irish-born American philanthropist (b. 1840)
- December 14 – Julia Grant, First Lady of the United States (b. 1826)
- December 22 – Richard von Krafft-Ebing, German sexologist (b. 1840)
- December 23 – Frederick Temple, Archbishop of Canterbury (b. 1821)

== Nobel Prizes ==

- Physics – Hendrik Lorentz and Pieter Zeeman
- Chemistry – Emil Fischer
- Medicine – Sir Ronald Ross
- Literature – Theodor Mommsen
- Peace – Élie Ducommun and Charles Albert Gobat

== Further reading and year books ==
- Colby, Frank Moore ed. he International Yearbook A Compendium Of The Worlds Progress During The Year 1902 (1903) coverage of each state online
- 1902 Annual Cyclopedia (1903) online; highly detailed coverage of "Political, Military, and Ecclesiastical Affairs; Public Documents; Biography, Statistics, Commerce, Finance, Literature, Science, Agriculture, and Mechanical Industry" for 1902; massive compilation of facts and primary documents; worldwide coverage; 865pp
- Wall, Edgar G. ed. The British Empire yearbook (1903), 1276pp; covers 1902 online
- Gilbert, Martin. A History of the Twentieth Century: vol. 1 1900-1933 (1997) pp 55–68; global coverage of politics, diplomacy and warfare.
