= Nurses Registration Act =

Nurses Registration Act may refer to:

- Nurses Registration Act 1901 of the Parliament of New Zealand
- Nurses Registration Act 1919 of the Parliament of the United Kingdom
