= Palmerston North Hospital =

Palmerston North Regional Hospital
- MidCentral District Health Board
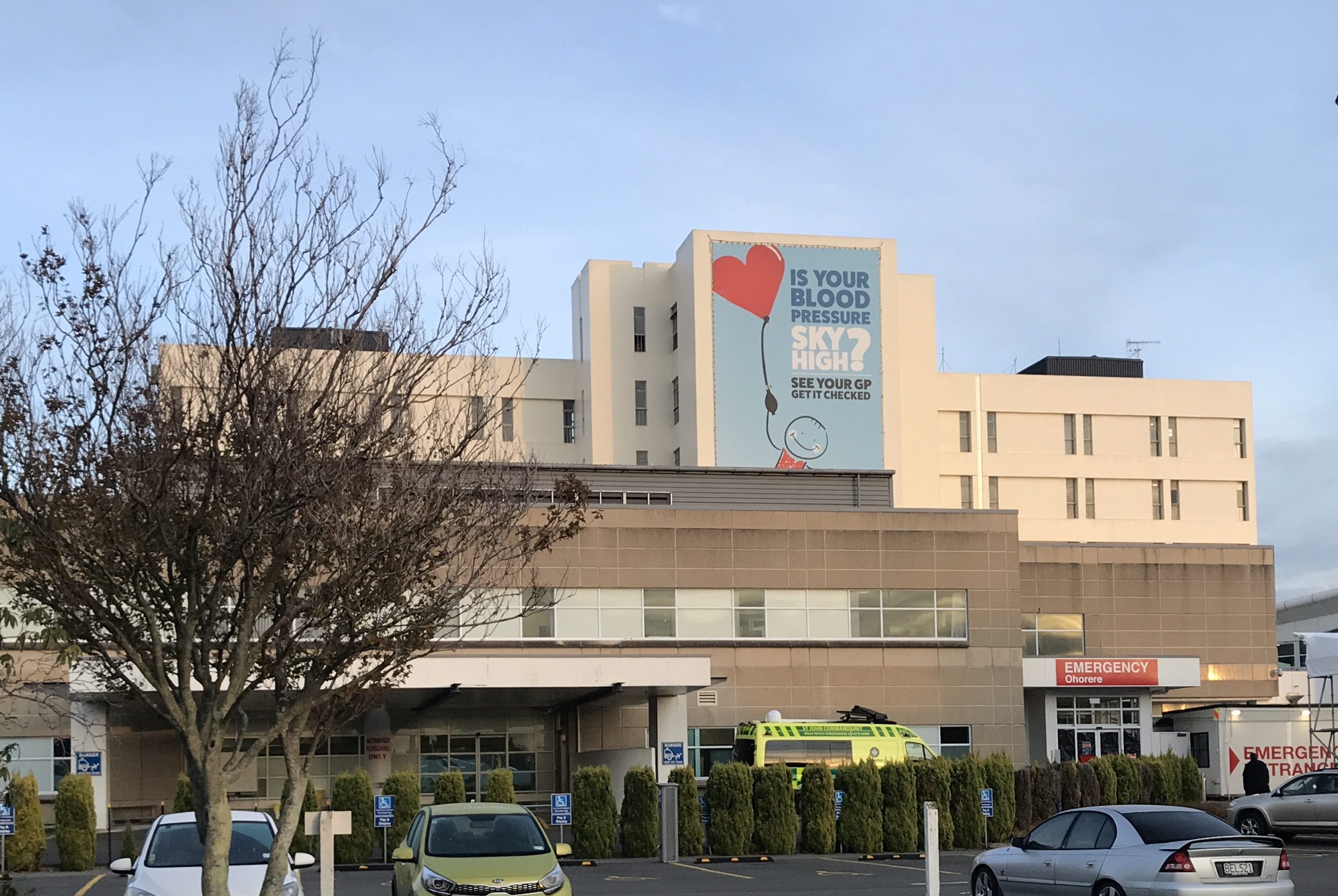
- Palmerston North Regional Hospital main building, May 2020

Geography
- Location: Palmerston North, Manawatū-Whanganui, New Zealand
- Coordinates: 40.3387°S 175.6203°E

Organisation
- Type: General

Services
- Emergency department: Yes
- Beds: 354

Helipads
- Helipad: ICAO: NZJM

History
- Opened: 1893

Links
- Website: Official website
- Lists: Hospitals in New Zealand

Palmerston North Regional Hospital is the primary public hospital in Palmerston North, New Zealand. Located at the northern end of Ruahine Street, it is approximately 2 km (1.2 mi) northeast of The Square. The hospital is operated by Health New Zealand Te Whatu Ora, MidCentral District (formerly the MidCentral District Health Board) and primarily serves Palmerston North and the surrounding districts of Manawatū, Tararua and Horowhenua. As of 2020, the hospital has 354 inpatient beds.

== History ==
The hospital first opened on 27 November 1893 with 25 inpatient beds across four wards, and was staffed by two doctors and three nurses. Ellen Dougherty was the hospital's first matron and became the world's first registered nurse on 10 January 1902, following the passage of the Nurses Registration Act 1901 by New Zealand Parliament.

In 1968, a 20-year-old male patient died during surgery at the hospital in New Zealand's first recorded case of malignant hyperthermia (MH), a genetic disorder which causes a severe reaction in susceptible person when exposed to certain anaesthetic agents. It was later discovered that the deceased was part of a large family based in the Manawatū region with a long history of the MH gene. As a result, approximately one in every 200 surgeries at Palmerston North Regional Hospital involves a MH-susceptible patient, compared to between 1:10,000 and 1:250,000 worldwide. New Zealand's first (and only) MH testing centre was set up at Massey University in 1978, and was taken over the hospital's anaesthetic department in 1986.

In early October 2024, the New Zealand Government allocated NZ$6 million to improve emergency department wait times and patient care and services at Palmerston North Hospital.

== Services ==
Palmerston North Hospital is the sole major trauma centre in the MidCentral District and one of four in the lower North Island, alongside Hawke's Bay Hospital, Whanganui Hospital and Wellington Regional Hospital.

The hospital has a 12-bed neonatal unit designated level 2A, equipped to care for babies above 28 weeks gestation and weighing over 1000 grams.

== Notable staff ==
- Arthur Anderson Martin – surgeon
