= Arthur Anderson Martin =

New Zealand surgeon

Arthur Anderson Martin (26 March 1876 – 17 September 1916) was a New Zealand surgeon.

Martin was born in Milton, South Otago, New Zealand on 26 March 1876. He studied at the University of Edinburgh, where he gained an MB ChB in 1900 and an M.D. in 1903 with a thesis on surgery in the Boer War in which he served as a civilian surgeon in the South African Field Force. He returned to Palmerston North where he worked in general practice and as a surgeon at the hospital. He gained a reputation for his surgical skills, particularly in cancer surgery and treatment.

In 1914 Martin enlisted with the Royal Army Medical Corps and served in the British Expeditionary Force in France and Belgium. He was praised for his surgical skills in battle and his bravery for often placing himself in dangerous situations. He returned to New Zealand for rest and recuperation but spent some time training personnel at the New Zealand Medical Corps training site at Awapuni. He joined the Medical Corps and returned to France in 1916. He was fatally wounded at Flers and died in Amiens on 17 September 1916.

== Awards ==
Martin was awarded the 1914 Star, the British War Medal, a DSO posthumously and was Mentioned in Dispatches.

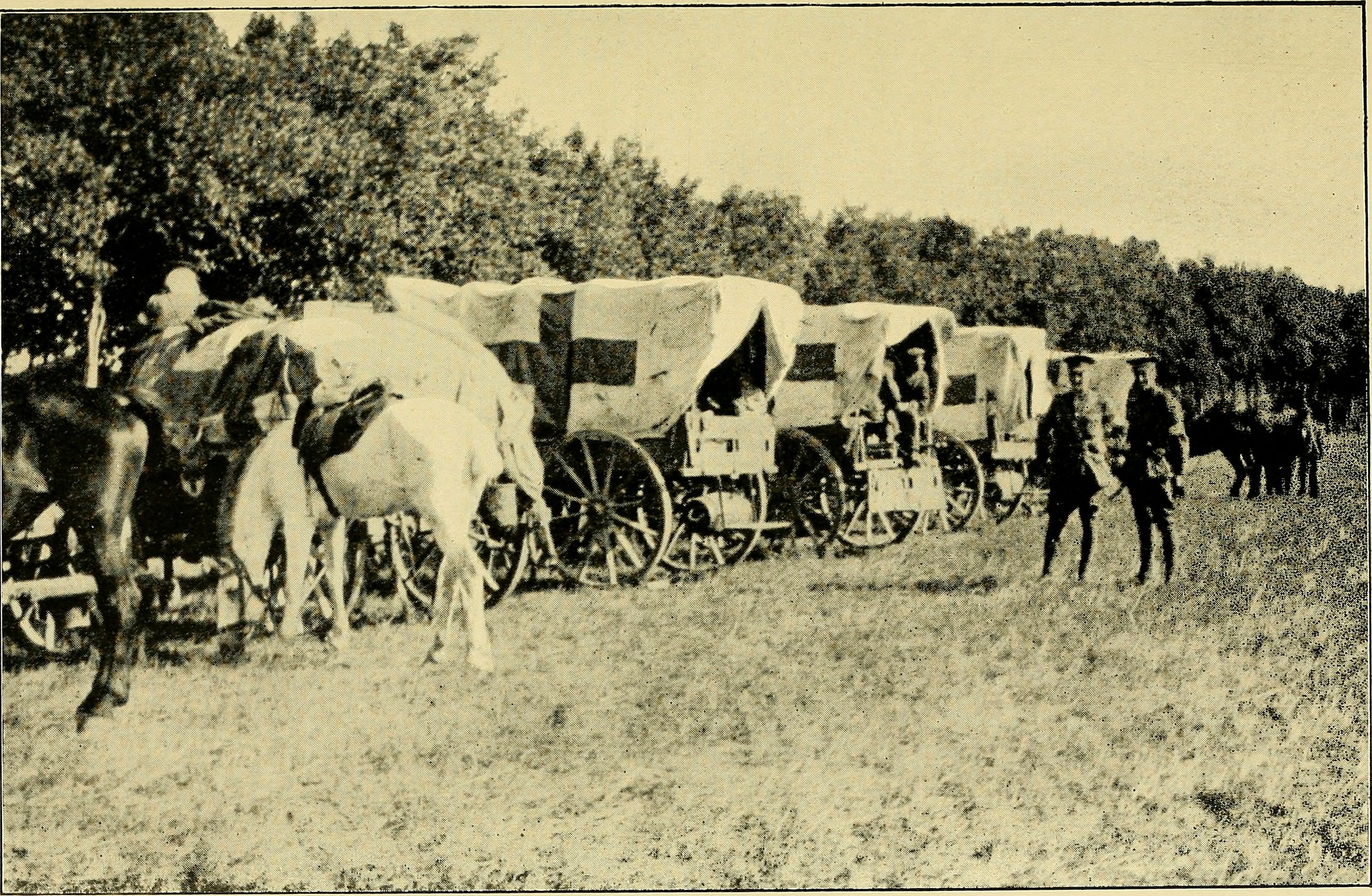
Ambulances at the Marne, First Battle of the Marne. Photo from A Surgeon in Khaki by Martin

== Publications ==
- Surgical notes from a temporary clearing hospital at the front, 1915
- A Surgeon in Khaki – an account of his experiences as a doctor in WWI.

== Legacy ==
At Palmerston North Hospital a memorial wing was dedicated to Martin as well as a memorial plaque. All Saints Church in Palmerston North has a plaque and a flag in his memory. Another memorial plaque is in St Paul's Church in Symonds St, Auckland.
