= Ellen Dougherty =

World's first Registered Nurse (1844–1919)

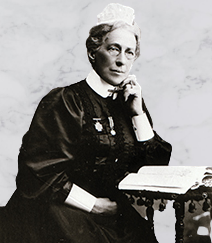
- Born: 20 September 1844; Cutters Bay, New Zealand
- Died: 3 November 1919 (aged 75)
- Known for: First registered nurse

Ellen Dougherty (20 September 1844 – 3 November 1919), a New Zealand nurse, was the first Registered Nurse in the world.

== Biography ==
Ellen Dougherty was born at Cutters Bay, Port Underwood, New Zealand. Ellen was inspired to be a nurse after learning about Florence Nightingale. It is believed that before nurse training, she worked with Charles Barraud in his Wellington pharmacy. She trained at Wellington Hospital from 1885 and completed a certificate in nursing in 1887. In 1893 she accepted the post of matron of the newly opened Palmerston North Hospital. In 1899 she was formally registered as a pharmacist.

In 1901, New Zealand became the first country to pass legislation, the Nurses Registration Act, on the registration of nurses. Dougherty was then the first to be registered on 10 January 1902. She retired in 1908.

Dougherty is buried at Clareville Cemetery, Carterton, New Zealand. Her medal is at the Nurses Chapel at Wellington Hospital. For the centenary of Nursing, it was arranged with Nursing Council in Wellington that her grave be restored, and on the anniversary of 10 January 2002, the grave was rededicated with family, historians and media attending.

The UK began nurse registration in 1919, the year Ellen Dougherty died.
