= Nurses Registration Act 1901 =

Act of Parliament in New Zealand

New Zealand Parliament

Legislative history
- Passed: 12 September 1901
- Status: Repealed

The Nurses Registration Act was passed on 12 September 1901 in New Zealand, providing for the registration of trained nurses.

The legislation came into effect on 1 January 1902, leading New Zealand to become the first country in the world to regulate nurses nationally. On 10 January 1902 Ellen Dougherty became the first registered nurse in New Zealand, and in the world.

Like other New Zealand acts requiring registration of professions there was a transition or grandfather clause allowing registration of nurses with at least four years experience even if they did not have the training specified for new nurses by the act and regulations (see clause 5 of act).

== See also ==
- Health care in New Zealand
- Nurses Registration Act 1919 (United Kingdom law)
