= February 1902 =

Month in 1902

<<	February 1902					>>
Su	Mo	Tu	We	Th	Fr	Sa
						1
2	3	4	5	6	7	8
9	10	11	12	13	14	15
16	17	18	19	20	21	22
23	24	25	26	27	28

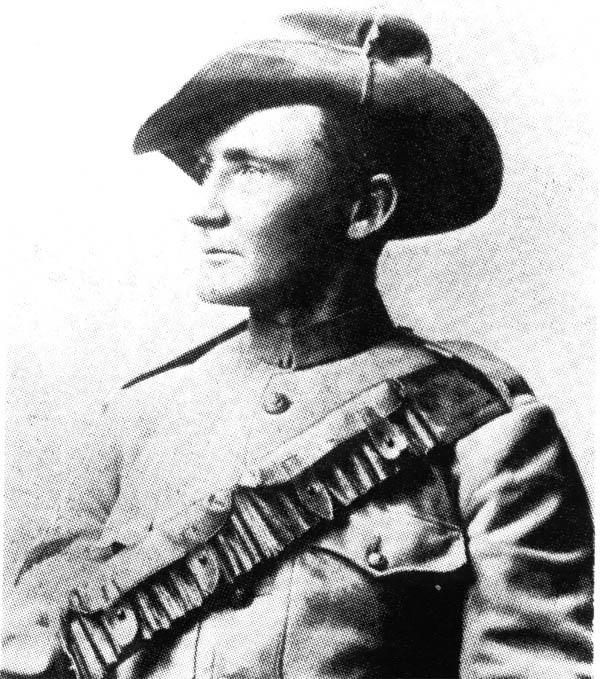
February 27, 1902: Convicted war criminal Harry "Breaker" Morant executed by firing squad in Pretoria...

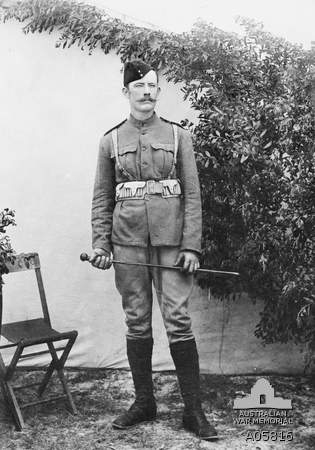
... along with co-conspirator Peter Handcock.

The following events occurred in February 1902:

== February 1, 1902 (Saturday) ==
- A gas explosion at a coal mine in Mexico killed over 100 miners.
- Born: Langston Hughes, African-American writer; in Joplin, Missouri (d. 1967)
- Died: Salomon Jadassohn, 70, German composer and pianist (b. 1831)

== February 2, 1902 (Sunday) ==
- The first labor union in the Philippines, the Unión Obrera Democrática Filipina, was organized by Isabelo de los Reyes and Hermenegildo Cruz.
- Died: George D. Tillman, 75, U.S. Representative 1883-1893 from South Carolina.

== February 3, 1902 (Monday) ==
- The French ship Chanaral wrecked on the coast of Brittany, France, killing 21 people.
- A Papal decree of 3 February 1902 by Pope Leo XIII stipulated that henceforth castrati would no longer be accepted into the Sistine Chapel Choir. The current castrati would be permitted to remain until they died, retired, or were pensioned off.

== February 4, 1902 (Tuesday) ==
- Robert Falcon Scott and Ernest Shackleton made the first balloon flight in Antarctica, ascending to 800 feet (240 m) in a tethered hydrogen observation balloon, from which they took the first Antarctic aerial photographs.
- Insurgent prisoners escaped Colombia's Fort Boca prison in Cartagena.
- Seven members of the St. Louis Fire Department in Missouri died in the collapse of the American Tent and Awning Company building, the greatest loss of life in the department's history. When the fire at the building was almost under control, the third floor collapsed under two of the firemen. The other five firemen entered the building to rescue their colleagues, but the building collapsed on top of them. Killed were Assistant Chief August Thierry, Capt. Daniel Steele, Lt. Frank McBride, Lt. Michael Kehoe, Charles Krenning, Charles Westenhoff and William Dundon.
- Born:
  - Charles Lindbergh, American aviator who became famous in 1927 by making the first trans-Atlantic airplane flight; in Detroit (d. 1974)
  - Reginald Beck, British film editor; to a British diplomat in Saint Petersburg, Russian Empire. (d. 1992)
  - Margaret Dare, Scottish cellist; in Newport-on-Tay, Fife (d. 1976)
  - Hartley Shawcross, British barrister and politician; in Giessen, Germany (d. 2003)

== February 5, 1902 (Wednesday) ==
- The French Chamber of Deputies approved a resolution to reduce the workload for coal miners to nine hours per day, approving it 338 to 219. Under the legislation, the workday would be 8 1/2 hours by 1904 and eight hours in 1906.
- Born: Kaoru Iwamoto, Japanese professional Go player; in Masuda, Shimane Prefecture (d. 1999)

== February 6, 1902 (Thursday) ==
- Belgium received its only concession of land from China as it was granted 120 acres (49 ha) of land in the city of Tianjin. Belgian consul Henri Ketels and Chinese foreign ministry official Zhang Lianfen signed the agreement for a parcel of land on the east side of the Hai River, adjacent to the Russian concession. Belgium would return the concession to Chinese control in 1929 in return for repayment of a Belgian loan.
- The U.S. territorial government in the Philippines established the Bureau of Customs, a Philippine-operated agency that would serve as a counterpart to the American Customs Service.
- Spanish wine and sherry entrepreneur Manuel Críspulo González y Soto became the first Marquis of Bonanza, a title created by decree of the Queen Regent, Maria Christina of Austria.
- Born: Beryl McLeish, a wartime superintendent of the Australian Women's Land Army (AWLA); in Gympie, Queensland (d. 1974)
- Died: Clémence Royer, 71, French scholar and translator of Charles Darwin's On the Origin of Species

== February 7, 1902 (Friday) ==
- A new high speed railroad train was tested by the Pennsylvania Railroad. Averaging 67.5 miles per hour (108.6 km/h) the train covered the 90.2 miles (145.2 km) distance between New York City and Philadelphia in only one hour and 24 minutes.
- Canada's Justice Minister, David Mills, resigned to become a judge on the Supreme Court of Canada.
- Died: Thomas Sidney Cooper, 98, English landscape painter (b. 1803)

== February 8, 1902 (Saturday) ==
- David Mills was appointed Puisne Justice of the Supreme Court of Canada.
- Born:
  - Demchugdongrub, Mongolian prince and politician; in Chahar Province, Mongolia, Chinese Empire (d. 1966)
  - Robert H.H. Hugman, American architect famous for designing the San Antonio River Walk; in San Antonio, Texas (d. 1980)

== February 9, 1902 (Sunday) ==
- The South African Republic's General Christiaan de Wet was able to escape through British lines back to safety.
- Fire leveled 26 city blocks of Paterson, New Jersey, after spreading from trolley car sheds, and destroyed 459 buildings, including churches, homes, offices, and the City Hall.
- Four years after the end of the Spanish–American War, Spain's cabinet authorized its Foreign Minister, the Duke of Almodóvar del Río, to sign a treaty of friendship with the United States.
- Born: Fred Harman, who drew the Red Ryder comic strip for 25 years; in St. Joseph, Missouri (d. 1982)

== February 10, 1902 (Monday) ==
- The British Government announced that it would not give up its concession in China's Wei-Hai-Wei, but pledged that it would withdraw troops.
- The City Savings Bank of Detroit failed.
- Born: Walter Houser Brattain, American physicist and Nobel Prize laureate; in Xiamen, Fujian province China, to American missionary parents (d. 1987)

== February 11, 1902 (Tuesday) ==
- The United Kingdom announced the signing of a treaty of alliance with Japan, subject to approval of the parliaments of both empires, in order to preserve the integrity of China and Korea.
- Police and universal suffrage demonstrators fought in Brussels.
- Born: Arne Jacobsen, Danish architect and designer; in Copenhagen (d. 1971)

== February 12, 1902 (Wednesday) ==
- Hohenzollern, the personal yacht of Germany's Kaiser Wilhelm arrived in New York City in advance of the arrival of Prince Henry.
- The first Anglo-Japanese Alliance was announced. This and the renewals to the treaty in 1905 and 1911 played a major role in World War I.
- Died: The Marquess of Dufferin, 75, British administrator who served as the third Governor General of Canada from 1872 to 1878, then as the Viceroy of India from 1884 to 1888 (b. 1826)

== February 13, 1902 (Thursday) ==
- An earthquake of magnitude 6.9 struck in the Shamakhi District in Azerbaijan, reportedly killing 2,000 people and destroying 4,000 homes. An official report listed only 86 deaths despite the destruction of over 3,000 homes.
- The 1902 World Figure Skating Championships took place in London. Only four skaters participated in the singles competition, which was won by Ulrich Salchow of Sweden.
- Born: Oswald D. Heck, longest serving Speaker of the New York State Assembly; in Schenectady, New York. (d. 1959)
- Died: Robert B. Lindsay, 77, Scottish-American politician who served as Governor of Alabama during the Reconstruction era from 1870 to 1872 (b. 1824)

== February 14, 1902 (Friday) ==
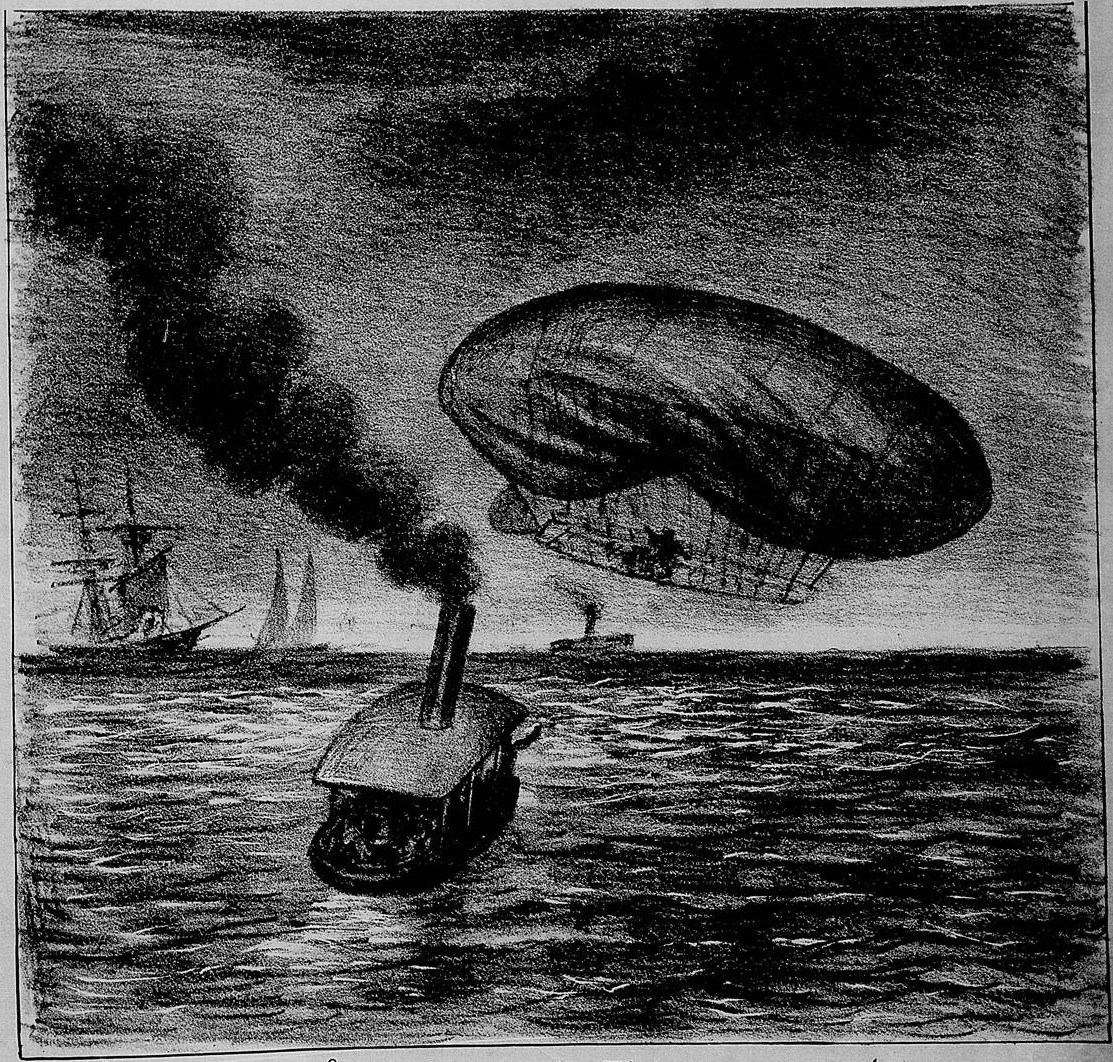
Santos-Dumont's disaster

- Brazilian airship aviator Alberto Santos-Dumont escaped disaster as his prize-winning Airship No. 6 experienced extreme heading of the hydrogen balloon while he was over the Mediterranean Sea. The ship, already directed nose-up during its ascension, tilted further upward. Wires supporting the gondola broke and tangled in the propeller. Faced with the prospect of an explosion or a loss of control, Santos-Dumont was able to reach the controls to shut off the motor and to vent the hydrogen enough to make a safe landing in the sea, where he was rescued. The airship was salvaged, and although it would be repaired and put on display in London's Crystal Palace Park, it would never fly again.
- Born: Thelma Ritter, American actress; in New York City (d. 1969)
- Died: James Bradley Thayer, 71, American law professor and authority on constitutional law (b. 1831)

== February 15, 1902 (Saturday) ==
- The "Stammstrecke" route of the Berlin U-Bahn underground transport system was opened, and immediately became popular.
- Died:
  - Viggo Hørup, 60, Danish liberal politician and journalist who inspired Denmark's Radikale Venstre (the Radical Left or Danish Social Liberal Party), died of cancer. In 1909, Carl Theodor Zahle would become the first Radical Left Prime Minister of Denmark (b. 1841)
  - William H. West, 45, white American entertainer who managed a minstrel show using African American performers rather than white performers in blackface, died of cancer (b. 1853)

== February 16, 1902 (Sunday) ==
- Ascensión Esquivel Ibarra was elected president of Costa Rica, receiving 78 percent of the vote as a candidate for the new Partido Unión Nacional (PUN). Esquivel took office on May 8, 1902.
- The record low temperature in Honolulu of 52 °F (11 °C) was set. It would be tied on January 20, 1969, though not broken.
- Born:
  - Kathleen Snavely, Irish supercentenarian. Snavely lived died in July 6, 2015 aged 113 years and 140 days.
  - Zhang Yuzhe (Chinese: 张钰哲), Chinese astronomer, widely regarded as the father of modern Chinese astronomy; in Minhou, Fujian province (d. 1986)
- Died:
  - Ivers S. Calkin, 65, Medal of Honor recipient for actions at the Battle of Sailor's Creek in the American Civil War on 6 April 1865.
  - George Carter Needham, 56, American evangelist whose name was applied by a candy manufacturer to a popular confectionery bar in the 19th century

== February 17, 1902 (Monday) ==
- In the Bulgarian parliamentary election, the Progressive Liberal Party of Prime Minister Stoyan Danev won 89 of the 189 seats.
- The United States Senate voted to ratify the purchase by the United States from Denmark of the Danish West Indies, now the United States Virgin Islands.
- A rule was introduced that allowed the Speaker of the UK House of Commons to suspend the current session "in the case of grave disorder arising"
- Born: Vasily Shatilov, Soviet Army colonel general credited with the capture of the Reichstag during the Battle of Berlin; in Kalmek, Voronezh Governorate, Russian Empire. (d. 1995)
- Died: Yang Yü (Chinese: 楊儒), 60, Chinese diplomat and ambassador to the U.S. and Russia.

== February 18, 1902 (Tuesday) ==
- U.S. President Theodore Roosevelt prosecuted the Northern Securities Company for violation of the Sherman Act.
- The first performance of Jules Massenet's opera Le jongleur de Notre-Dame took place at the Opéra Garnier in Monte Carlo.
- In elections in the U.S. city of Pittsburgh, Pennsylvania, the new Citizens' Party defeated several incumbent city councilmen and the city's comptroller.
- Died:
  - Charles L. Tiffany, 90, American jewelry merchant who founded Tiffany & Co. (b. 1812)
  - Albert Bierstadt, 72, German-American landscape painter (b. 1830)
  - Marcellin Desboutin, 79, French portrait painter (b. 1823)
  - Reverend Newman Hall, 85, British Anglican bishop and author of the 1848 bestseller Come to Jesus (b. 1816)
  - Neville Bowles Chamberlain, 82, British Army field marshal (b. 1820)

== February 19, 1902 (Wednesday) ==
- France and Venezuela resumed diplomatic relations, seven years after breaking off contact in 1895.
- U.S. President Theodore Roosevelt rejected the appeal of Rear Admiral Winfield Scott Schley from the unfavorable decision of the United States Navy Board of Inquiry.
- Born:
  - Kay Boyle, American writer; in St. Paul, Minnesota (d. 1992)
  - Eddie Peabody, American musician; in Reading, Massachusetts (d. 1970)
- Died:
  - Richard Maurice Bucke, 64, Canadian psychiatrist, known for his 1901 book Cosmic Consciousness and his theory that human beings could obtain a higher form of consciousness. Bucke suffered a fatal head injury after slipping and falling on a patch of ice at his home. (b. 1837)
  - Thomas F. Toon, 61, American educator and former Confederate general during the American Civil War (b. 1840)

== February 20, 1902 (Thursday) ==
- The Empress Dowager of China and the young Emperor gave private audiences to the new foreign representatives who had arrived at the Forbidden City of Beijing.
- The largest ocean liner built in the United States, SS Kroonland, was launched in Philadelphia after being constructed for J. P. Morgan's International Mercantile Marine Company line.
- Born: Ansel Adams, American photographer; in San Francisco (d. 1984)

== February 21, 1902 (Friday) ==
- A week of labor riots in Barcelona was finally brought to an end, but only after 50 people had been killed in the violence.
- Died:
  - Emil Holub, 54, Bohemian Czech explorer in Africa, died of malaria (b. 1847)
  - William S. Stokley, 78, American politician known for his corruption as Mayor of Philadelphia (b. 1823)

== February 22, 1902 (Saturday) ==
- A fire at the Park Avenue Hotel in New York City killed 17 people.
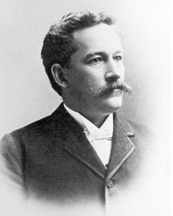
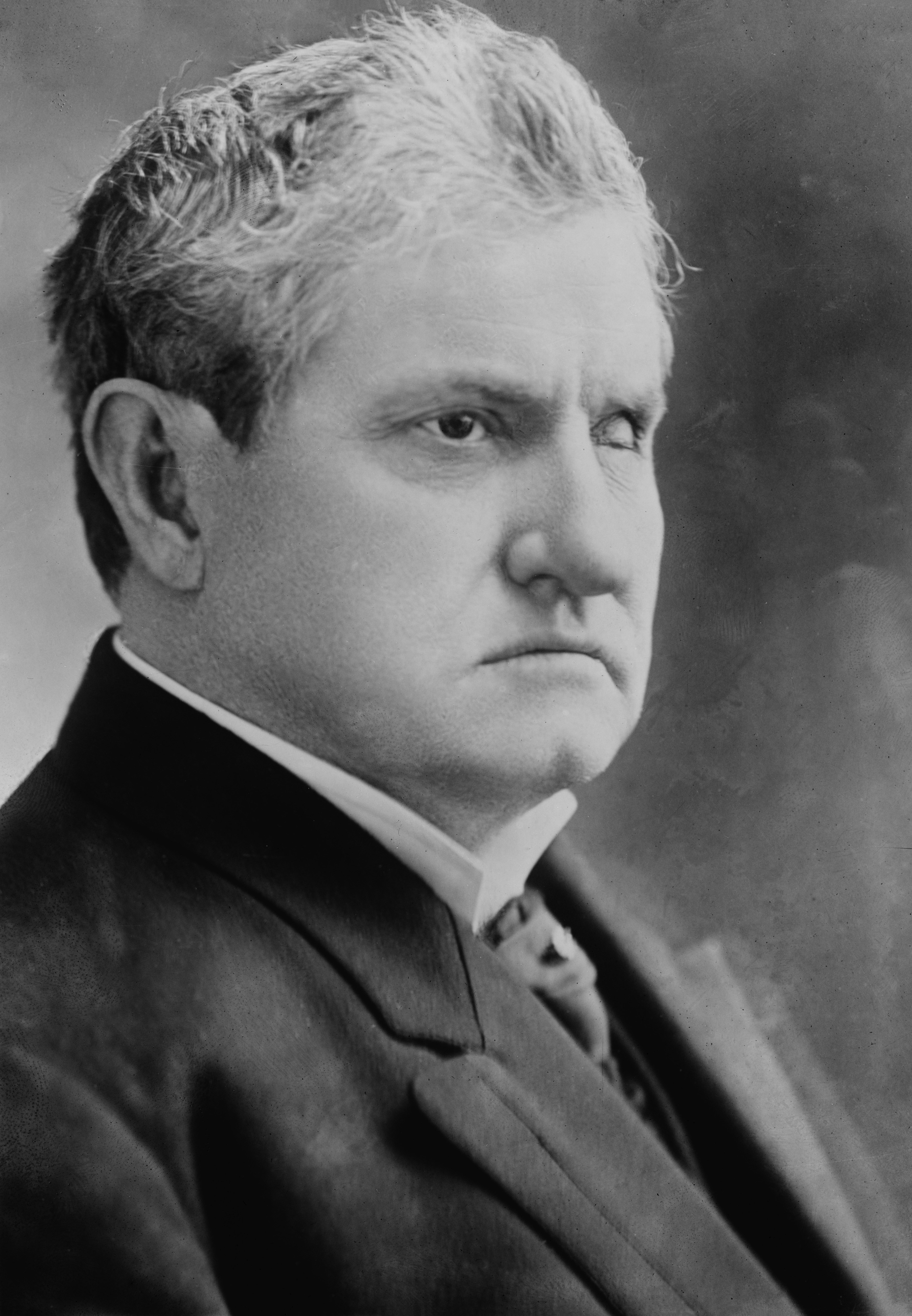
Senator McLaurin and Senator Tillman
- The two U.S. Senators from South Carolina, Benjamin Tillman and John L. McLaurin, got into a fistfight during a heated debate while the Senate was in session. According to The New York Times, "Mr. Tillman charged his colleague with succumbing to improper influences" when the peace treaty with Spain (to end the Spanish–American War) was before the Senate... Mr. McLaurin called Mr. Tillman a liar. Then came a blow from Mr. Tillman, a counter-blow from Mr. McLaurin, a clinch, and a series of wild punches."
- The 1902 British Home Championship soccer tournament began in Cardiff, with Ireland defeating Wales, 3–0.
- Died: Rebecca Salome Foster, 53, American missionary and prison relief worker known as "The Tombs Angel"; she was one of the victims of the Park Avenue Hotel fire (b. 1848)

== February 23, 1902 (Sunday) ==
- American Protestant missionary Ellen M. Stone and her fellow missionary, Katerina Stefanova Tsilka, were released by Bulgarian rebels in the Ottoman Empire, more than five months after they had been kidnapped on September 3, 1901. Miss Tsilka, who was pregnant at the time the two women were taken captive near Bansko, Bulgaria, gave birth to a daughter while being held for ransom. The three arrived in Strumica at 3 a.m.; Miss Stone then proceeded to Salonika.
- Prince Henry of Prussia arrived in New York Harbor aboard the ship Kronprinz Wilhelm.

== February 24, 1902 (Monday) ==
- Tomás Estrada Palma was formally selected as the first President of Cuba by the Cuban Electoral College, and Luis Estévez was approved as the first Vice President.
- The French Chamber of Deputies voted to approve a resolution requiring two years compulsory military service for adult men.
- U.S. President Theodore Roosevelt hosted Prince Henry of Prussia at dinner at the White House. The two men traveled together to New York City by railroad the next day.
- The British post-office telephone system was inaugurated, giving access to telephone service for paying British customers.
- The maximum salary of rural free delivery letter carriers was raised from $500 per year to $600 per year by the United States Postmaster General.
- Born: Paul Redfern, American aviator and musician who disappeared in August 1927 attempting to fly from Brunswick, Georgia to Rio de Janeiro; in Rochester, New York. As of 2023, he and his airplane were still missing in Venezuela.

== February 25, 1902 (Tuesday) ==
- Meteor III, the world's largest yacht, was launched from the shipyard at Shooters Island, where it had been constructed at the direction of Germany's Kaiser Wilhelm. Having recently celebrated her 18th birthday, Alice Roosevelt, the daughter of U.S. President Theodore Roosevelt, was given the honor of christening the ship in the presence of Prince Henry of Prussia.
- The British sailing ship Liverpool, en route from Antwerp to San Francisco, hit rocks at Hommeaux Florains, on Alderney in the Channel Islands, in fog. All on board survived the incident.
- Died:
  - Manuel A. Gonzalez, 69, Spanish-born American founder of Fort Myers, Florida
  - John B. Sherman, 77, American businessman who founded Chicago's Union Stock Yards

== February 26, 1902 (Wednesday) ==
- The centennial of the birth of Victor Hugo was celebrated in France with the dedication of a monument at his birthplace at Besançon, France.
- In the North Kilkenny by-election, brought about by the resignation of the sitting MP Patrick McDermott of the Irish Parliamentary Party, Joseph Devlin stood unopposed and retained the seat on behalf of his party.
- There was a festival on 26 February 1902 attended by emperor Thành Thái and the governor general Paul Doumer as an early activity of the Hanoi Exhibition which would open on November 15, 1902.
- Died:
  - Jerome Wheelock, 67, American inventor (b. 1834)
  - Henry Gurdon Marquand, 81, American philanthropist and president of the Metropolitan Museum of Art (b. 1819)

== February 27, 1902 (Thursday) ==
- Australian officers Harry "Breaker" Morant and Peter Handcock, both British subjects, were executed by a British Army firing squad following their court-martial and conviction for war crimes. The charges arose from the pair's revenge killings against Boer prisoners of war and civilians in Northern Transvaal, during the Second Boer War. The sentence was carried out at the Pretoria prison by the King's Own Cameron Highlanders. Morant would be celebrated later as a folk hero, including in a 1978 stage play and an award-winning 1980 film.
- The Congress of Venezuela voted to approve the re-election of President Cipriano Castro.
- Bank Leumi, now the largest bank in Israel by total assets, was founded in Jaffa, Independent Sanjak of Jerusalem, Ottoman Empire as the Anglo Palestine Company.
- Born:
  - Lúcio Costa, Brazilian architect and urban planner, best known for his plan for Brasília; to Brazilian parents in Toulon, France (d. 1998)
  - Gene Sarazen, American golfer; in Harrison, New York (d. 1999)
  - John Steinbeck, American novelist; in Salinas, California (d. 1968)
- Died: Robert Meacham, 64, American slave who purchased his freedom and became a member of the Florida state legislature

== February 28, 1902 (Friday) ==
- The United States Senate voted to censure Senators Tillman and McLaurin for their fist fight on the floor of the Senate on February 22.
- Born: Marcela Paz (pen name for Esther Huneeus Ramos Falla Salas de Claro), Chilean writer, in Santiago (d. 1985)
