= January 1902 =

Month in 1902

<<	January 1902					>>
Su	Mo	Tu	We	Th	Fr	Sa
			1	2	3	4
5	6	7	8	9	10	11
12	13	14	15	16	17	18
19	20	21	22	23	24	25
26	27	28	29	30	31

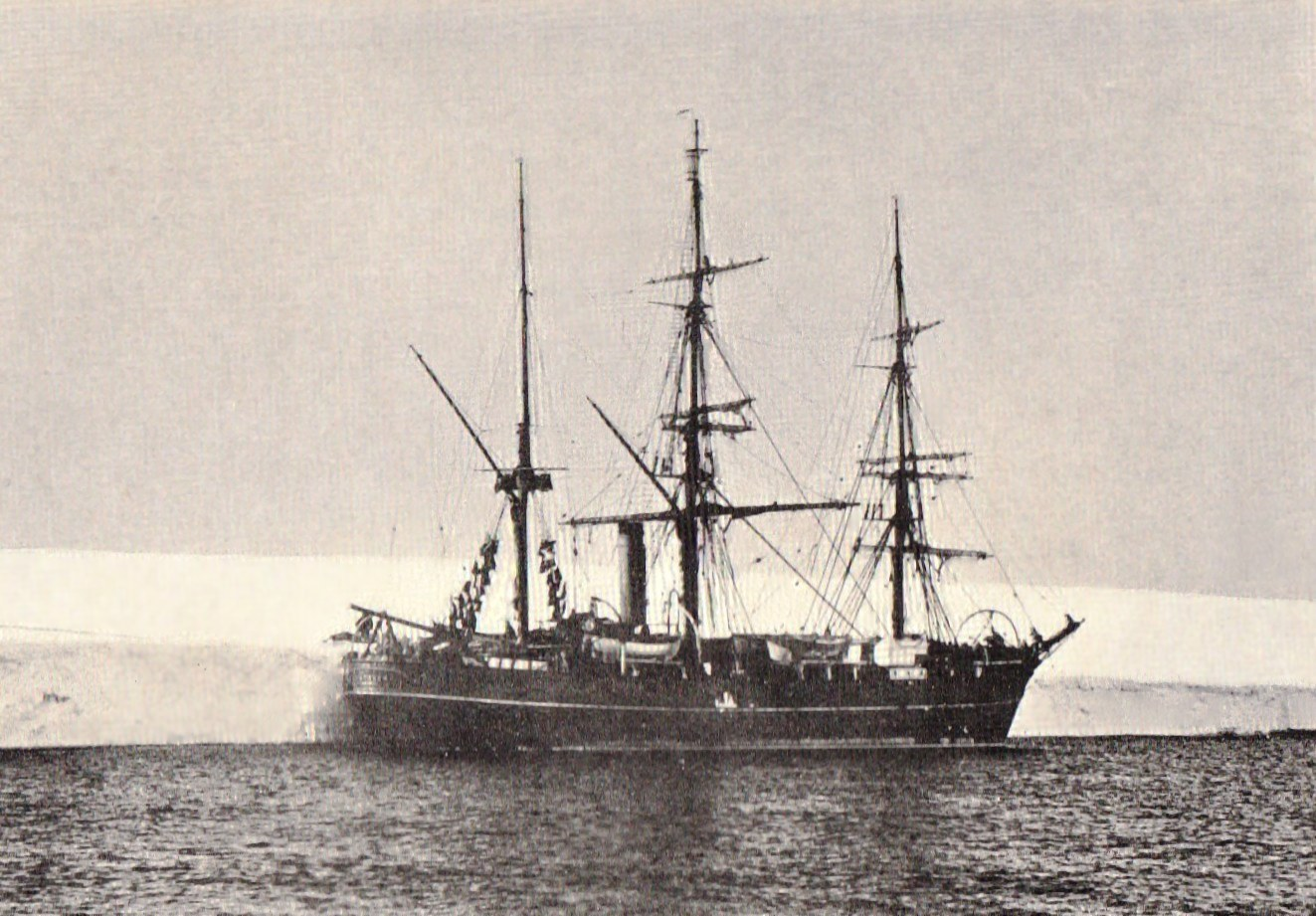
January 30, 1902: Scott's Discovery Expedition reaches the Great Ice Barrier in Antarctica

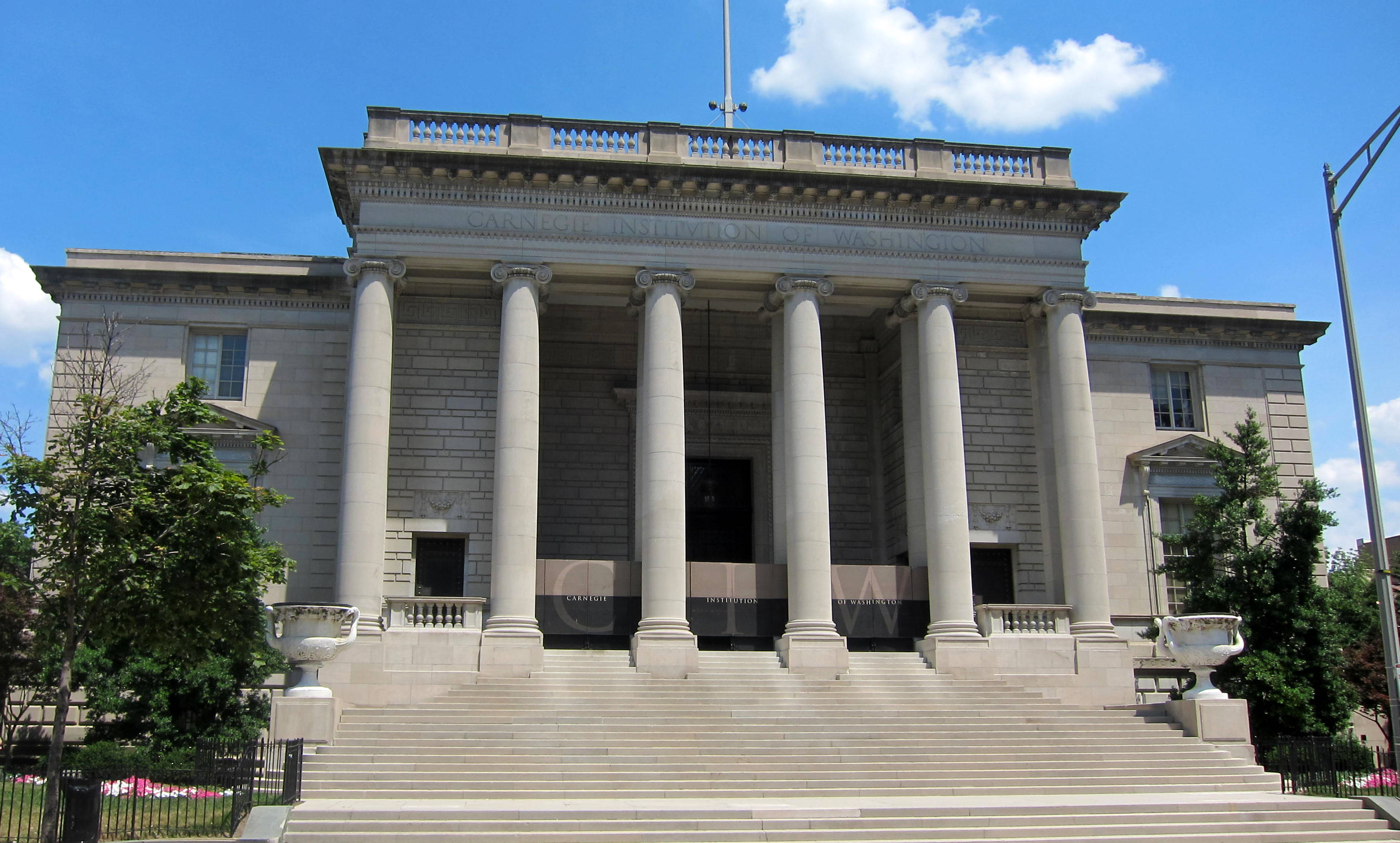
The Carnegie Institution

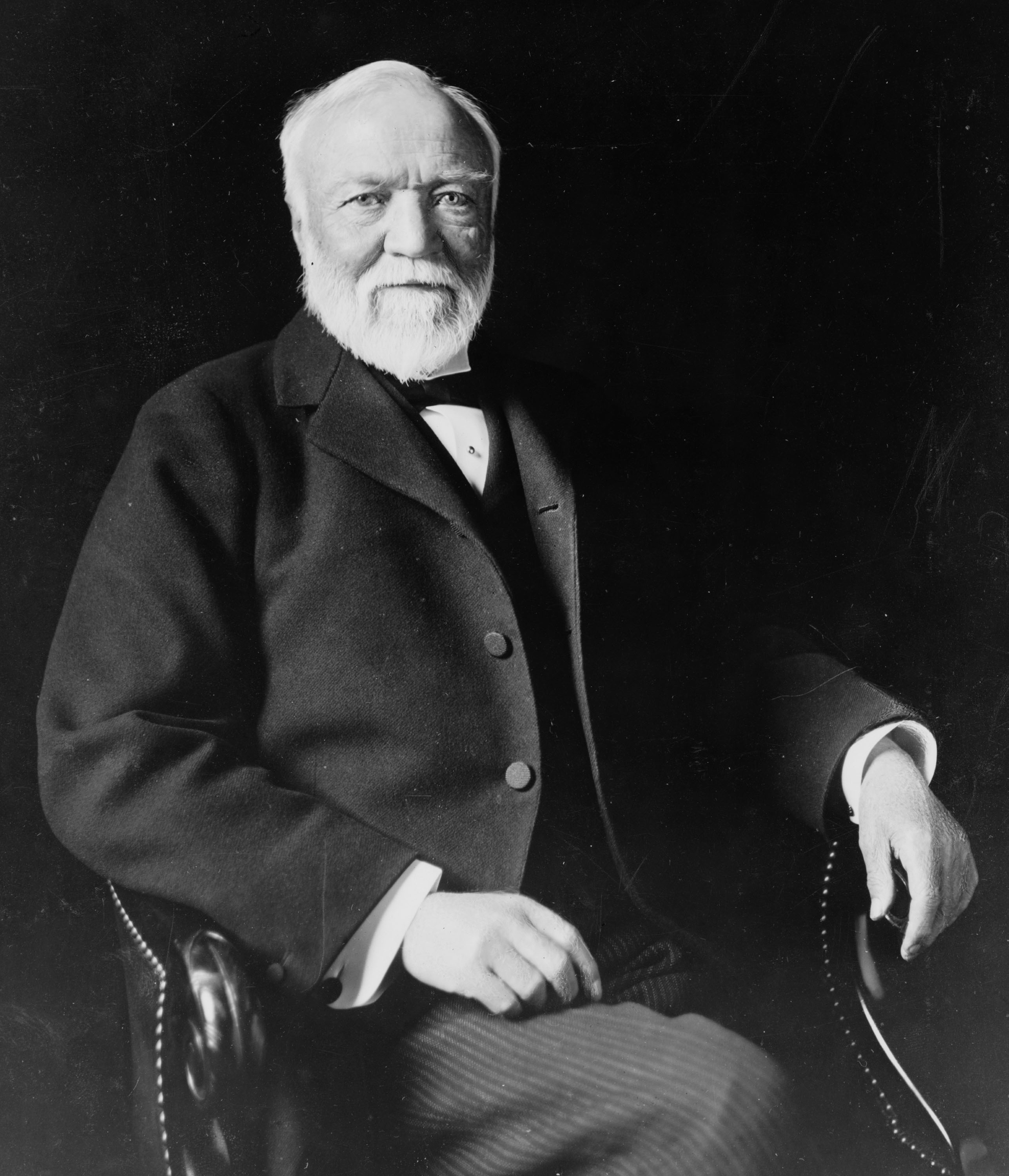
January 28, 1902: Andrew Carnegie endows the Carnegie Institution for Science

The following events occurred in January 1902:

== January 1, 1902 (Wednesday) ==
- The first college football bowl game, the "Tournament of Roses East–West Football Game", was held in Pasadena, California, pitting the unbeaten and unscored upon University of Michigan Wolverines against the once-defeated (3-1-1) Stanford University Indians. Michigan, the first of the "Point-a-Minute" football teams coached by Fielding H. Yost, had beaten all of its opponents by an average score of 50 to 0 in its regular season games (501 points in 10 games), and was leading Stanford, 49 to 0, when the game was stopped eight minutes early. A crowd of 8,500 people attended at Tournament Park. The annual New Year's Day bowl is referred to now as the Rose Bowl.
- The Nurses Registration Act 1901 came into effect in New Zealand, the first nation in the world to require state registration of nurses.
- An earthquake of magnitude 7.0 struck the Fox Islands in the U.S. Alaskan Territory.
- Several smaller railways combined to form the Swiss Federal Railways.
- Born: Buster Nupen, South African cricketer, in Ålesund, Norway (d. 1977)
- Died: Bertha Elisabeth Schippan, 13, Australian girl, victim of the "Towitta murder"; the perpetrator was never identified.

== January 2, 1902 (Thursday) ==
- In the second leg of the "World Championship" of soccer football, a friendly exhibition match between the winner of England's FA Cup (Tottenham Hotspur) and the winner of the Scottish Cup (Heart of Midlothian), played at Edinburgh after a scoreless tie between the two teams on September 2 in London, Heart of Midlothian won, 3 to 1.
- Born: Dan Keating, Irish republican, longest-surviving veteran of the Irish War of Independence, in Castlemaine, County Kerry, Ireland (d. 2007)

== January 3, 1902 (Friday) ==
- Miss Alice Roosevelt, the oldest daughter of U.S. President Theodore Roosevelt, was "formally presented to Washington society" at a ball at the White House, a month before her 18th birthday.

== January 4, 1902 (Saturday) ==
- Tzu Hsi, the Empress Dowager of China, issued an imperial edict directing her subjects to resume friendly relations with foreign diplomatic personnel in Beijing.
- Martial law was declared in Barcelona by the government of Spain after labor strikes began.
- The Panama Canal Company offered to sell its property rights, franchises and equipment to the United States government for $40,000,000.

== January 5, 1902 (Sunday) ==
- Mrs. Warren's Profession, a controversial play dealing with prostitution, written by George Bernard Shaw in 1893, was performed for the first time, privately, at the New Lyric Club in London.

== January 6, 1902 (Monday) ==
- Nineteen people were killed in a collision between a British ship and a Spanish ship off of the coast of Portugal.
- Died: Jan Gotlib Bloch (Ivan Stanislavovich Blokh), 67, Polish-Russian industrialist and political scientist who wrote about the future of warfare (b. 1836)

== January 7, 1902 (Tuesday) ==
- By a margin of only 394 votes, Republican Montague Lessler defeated Democrat Perry Belmont to fill a vacancy for the U.S. representative seat for the normally Democrat Seventh New York District.
- Died: Edward Clark, 79, Architect of the Capitol since 1865, who oversaw the completion of the United States Capitol dome and technological improvements including the addition of electricity, steam radiators and elevators. (b. 1822)

== January 8, 1902 (Wednesday) ==
- A train collision inside the New York Central Railroad's Park Avenue Tunnel killed 17 people and injured 38— mostly by scalding from a ruptured boiler — leading to increased demand for electric-powered trains and to the banning of steam locomotives in New York City.
- José Santos Zelaya was re-elected as President of Nicaragua for a second four-year term.
- Born: Georgy Malenkov, Soviet Politician (d. 1988)
- Died:
  - Marcellus Hartley, 74, American weapons manufacturer who owned the Remington Arms (b. 1827)
  - General Francis J. Herron, 64, Union Army commander and Medal of Honor winner who allegedly died in poverty after his retirement (b. 1837)

== January 9, 1902 (Thursday) ==
- The Discovery Expedition, an exploration voyage led by Captain Robert Falcon Scott, arrived at Cape Adare on the eastern side of Antarctica. Other members of the expedition included Ernest Shackleton, Tom Crean, Frank Wild and Edgar Evans.
- The United States House of Representatives voted, 307 to 2, in favor of the bill to construct the Nicaragua Canal.
- Born:
  - Sir Rudolf Bing, Austrian opera manager, in Vienna (d. 1997)
  - Josemaría Escrivá, Spanish priest and Catholic saint, in Barbastro, Spain (d. 1975)
  - Ann Nixon Cooper, African-American civil rights activist, in Shelbyville, Tennessee (d. 2009)

== January 10, 1902 (Friday) ==
- New Zealander Ellen Dougherty became the world's first registered nurse.
- A German record for the longest balloon flight was set by meteorologist Arthur Berson and balloonist Hermann Elias, when they completed a 30-hour journey of 913 miles (1,469 km) from Berlin in the German Empire, to Poltava in the Russian Empire.
- The German imperial government announced that Friedrich Alfred Krupp, the owner and operator of the Krupp Arms Manufacturing Company, was the wealthiest man in the German Empire, with an annual income of 20,000,000 marks (equivalent to USD $5,000,000 in 1902 and more than $150 million or €135 million per year in 2019).

== January 11, 1902 (Saturday) ==
- The first issue of Popular Mechanics magazine was published. Founded by Henry Haven Windsor, it initially had only five subscribers and sold only a few hundred copies on newsstands, but would continue to be published more than a century later.
- An electrified streetcar line opened between El Paso, Texas, in the United States, and Ciudad Juárez in Mexico as part of a public transportation system that operated in both nations, as the El Paso Electric Railway Company began conversion of its horse-drawn system of trolleys to electric powered vehicles.
- Born:
  - Maurice Buckmaster, English head of Special Operations Executive, at Brereton, Staffordshire (d. 1992)
  - Maurice Duruflé, French composer, in Louviers, France (d. 1986)
- Died:
  - Johnny Briggs, 39, English cricketer, from an epileptic seizure (b. 1862)
  - Horace Scudder, 63, American journalist, historian and children's author, known for being editor of The Atlantic Monthly and for the standard American school textbook A History of the United States of America (b. 1838)

== January 12, 1902 (Sunday) ==
- Sixty people were killed, and 100 people injured, by the explosion of a boiler in a textile mill in the municipality of Pont de Vilomara in Catalonia, Spain.
- The Uddevalla Suffrage Association, a Swedish political movement, was officially dissolved after twelve years of activity.
- Born: King Saud of Saudi Arabia, in Kuwait City (d. 1969)

== January 13, 1902 (Monday) ==
- What one author describes as "the first wave of Korean immigration" to the United States began with the arrival of the steamer S.S. Gaelic in the U.S. Hawaiian Territory, carrying 102 emigres from the Kingdom of Korea. Over the next three years, a total of 7,291 Korean laborers would arrive by ship to work in Hawaiian sugar plantations, until Japan's assumption of protectorate status over Korea and the closing off of emigration.
- Friedrich Delitzsch, a professor of Assyriology at the University of Berlin, began his series of controversial lectures that he titled Babel und Bibel, referring to the ancient Kingdom of Babylon (called "Babel" by the ancient Hebrews) and the Bible. Delitzsch advanced his theory, based on his own archaeological research of ancient cuneiform records, that Judaism and the Old Testament were derivative of the ancient Babylonian religion.
- Born: Karl Menger, Austrian-American mathematician who postulated Menger's theorem, in Vienna (d. 1985)

== January 14, 1902 (Tuesday) ==
- Arthur Pue Gorman was elected as the U.S. Senator for Maryland by the Maryland State Legislature.
- Died: William J. Parkinson, 57, Washington state senator and former President pro tempore of the Senate.

== January 15, 1902 (Wednesday) ==
- Fifteen of the 16 nations meeting at the Pan-American Conference in Mexico City, including the United States, signed their agreement to recognize the principles of compulsory arbitration of international disputes as outlined in the Hague Convention. Chile announced earlier that it would withdraw from the conference if compulsory arbitration was adopted.
- Joseph B. Foraker was elected as the U.S. Senator for Ohio by the Ohio State Legislature.
- Born: Nâzım Hikmet, Turkish poet, in Salonica, Ottoman Empire (d. 1963)
- Died: Alpheus Hyatt, 63, American zoologist and paleontologist (b. 1838)

== January 16, 1902 (Thursday) ==
- An earthquake of magnitude 7.0 struck Chilpancingo, the capital of the Mexican state of Guerrero. Despite the severity of the quake, only two people were killed and two injured.
- Underground public toilets were opened at Amagertorv, a central square in Copenhagen, Denmark.
- Born: Eric Liddell, Scottish athlete, in Tianjin, China (d. 1945)

== January 17, 1902 (Friday) ==
- The Times Literary Supplement was published for the first time, as an addition to London's venerable daily newspaper, The Times.
- Almost two years before the first flight by the Wright brothers, German-American aviator Gustave Whitehead claimed to have made two notable flights over Long Island Sound in a heavier-than-air, 40 hp- 29.9-kW- engine-powered flying machine with wheels and an amphibious boat-shaped hull.

== January 18, 1902 (Saturday) ==
- The kidnapping of two women missionaries, Ellen Maria Stone of the United States and Katerina Cilka of Bulgaria, drew to a close as their captors, members of the Internal Macedonian Revolutionary Organization, agreed to set them free in return for payment of a ransom of 14,000 Ottoman lira in gold (equivalent to $62,000 U.S. at the time). The two women, who had been taken hostage on September 3, 1901, were released in Strumica (now in North Macedonia) on February 2.
- The successful British musical A Country Girl premiered in London for the first of 729 performances, later being performed in the United States on Broadway.
- Died: Gideon Scheepers, 23, a leader of raids by the Orange Free State into Britain's Cape Colony during the Second Boer War in South Africa, was executed by a British Army firing squad (b. 1878)

== January 19, 1902 (Sunday) ==
- Four adjacent commercial buildings, along Jefferson Avenue near the intersection with Shelby Street in Detroit, and each four stories tall, collapsed without warning at 8:30 in the evening. "It was fortunate that the wreck occurred on Sunday," a correspondent noted, adding "Had it happened during business hours, the loss of life would have been appalling, as there were about 200 persons employed by the various firms."
- Born: David Olère, Polish-French artist and Holocaust survivor known for his paintings and drawings recalling his experiences at the Auschwitz concentration camp, in Warsaw (d. 1985)
- Died:
  - Mother Joseph Pariseau, 78, Canadian Roman Catholic nun and missionary who founded a network of schools and clinics that serviced American settlers in the U.S. state of Washington during the 19th century (b. 1823). A statue of Mother Joseph stands in the National Statuary Hall in the United States Capitol as one of the state's two representative statues.
  - Maria Cristina, 68, Infanta of Portugal and Spain (b. 1833)

== January 20, 1902 (Monday) ==
- Carlos Albán, Colombian inventor and that nation's Governor of the province of Panama, was killed when insurgents sank the ship that he was commanding, the Lautaro.
- Born:
  - Kevin Barry, Irish republican, in Dublin, Ireland (d. 1920)
  - Leon Ames, American actor, in Portland, Indiana (d. 1993)
- Died:
  - Camilla Urso, 61, French child prodigy and violinist (b. 1840)
  - Cornelius A. Cadmus, 57, former U.S. Congressman for New Jersey (b. 1844)

== January 21, 1902 (Tuesday) ==
- The Senate of France voted, 184 to 53, to approve a decree that abolished compulsory attendance at Roman Catholic mass for members of the French Navy.
- U.S. Navy Rear Admiral Winfield Scott Schley appealed to U.S. President Theodore Roosevelt from the findings of a Navy Court of Inquiry regarding actions during the Battle of Santiago de Cuba.
- William Howard Taft returned to the United States after completing his service as the Governor-General of the Philippines. Taft would be elected President of the United States in 1908.
- Died: Hugo Wilhelm von Ziemssen, 72, German physician and pioneer in electrotherapeutics and treatment of anemia (b. 1829)

== January 22, 1902 (Wednesday) ==
- The first recorded visit by a ship to Cape Crozier, on Ross Island in Antarctica, was made 60 years after it had first been observed in 1841 by the Ross expedition. A party from the British research ship RRS Discovery rowed ashore as part of the Discovery Expedition, commanded by Robert Falcon Scott. Captain Scott, Edward Wilson and Charles Royds then climbed a slope and observed a large colony of Adélie penguins. The three explorers erected a message post with information for the crews of relief ships.
- Born:
  - Daniel Kinsey, U.S. Olympic hurdler and 1924 gold medalist in the 110-metre hurdle, in St. Louis (d. 1970)
  - Franz Josef Huber, German Gestapo officer in charge of security in German Austria after the Anschluss and later a West German intelligence officer, in Munich (d. 1975)

== January 23, 1902 (Thursday) ==
- A snowstorm killed 199 Imperial Japanese Army soldiers who were on a training exercise in the Hakkōda Mountains, on the island of Honshu. It remains the largest disaster in the history of mountaineering.
- The Baghdad Railway Convention was signed in Constantinople between the Ottoman Empire and the United Kingdom.
- Australia defeated England by 4 wickets in the 3rd cricket test match at the Adelaide Oval.

== January 24, 1902 (Friday) ==
- Twenty coal miners were killed, and 14 seriously injured, in an explosion at the Lost Creek Fuel Company Number 2 mine in Mahaska County, Iowa. Coal miners across the state went on strike in order to force the enactment of stricter safety laws.
- King George of Greece survived an assassination attempt.
- Born: Ephraim Avigdor Speiser, American archaeologist and biblical scholar, in Skalat, Galicia (now Ukraine) (d. 1965)

== January 25, 1902 (Saturday) ==
- General Benjamin Viljoen of the South African Republic Army was taken prisoner of war by the British Army near Lydenburg, South Africa.
- Born:
  - André Beaufre, French general, in Neuilly-sur-Seine, France (d. 1975)
  - Pablo Antonio, Filipino modernist architect, in Manila (d. 1975)

== January 26, 1902 (Sunday) ==
- The first-ever ski race competition in Switzerland took place, held in the alpine resort of Glarus as a cross-country Nordic skiing event.
- Born:
  - U.S. Air Force Lieutenant General Laurence C. Craigie, in Concord, New Hampshire, American military officer and test pilot who was the first U.S. serviceman to pilot a jet airplane and the second American overall. Craigie made his flight on October 2, 1942, in a Bell XP-59 jet for the United States Army Air Corps. (d. 1994)
  - Menno ter Braak, Dutch author and polemicist, in Eibergen, Netherlands (d. 1940)
  - Hans Hoffmann, German musicologist, in Neustadt, Upper Silesia, German Empire (d. 1949)
- Died: General Harrison C. Hobart, 86, Union Army officer who led the successful escape of 109 prisoners of war from the Libby Prison camp in Richmond, Virginia during the American Civil War in 1864 (b. 1815)

== January 27, 1902 (Monday) ==
- General Manie Maritz of the South African Republic and his party of soldiers were attacked by a group of coloured residents of Leliefontein, in the north of Britain's Cape Colony, to ask questions of the Methodist missionaries there. Martiz retreated, then came back the next day and carried out the Leliefontein massacre, summarily shooting or bludgeoning at least 30 members of the population in retaliation for the offense.
- Born: Ed Gossett, U.S. congressman from Texas (d. 1990)

== January 28, 1902 (Tuesday) ==
- The Carnegie Institution was founded in Washington, D.C., with funding from a USD $10 million grant from Andrew Carnegie.
- The Austrian capital of Vienna converted to an all-electric streetcar system, as the last of the horse-drawn railcars was retired.
- Two months after making the successful circumnavigation of the Eiffel Tower by air, Alberto Santos-Dumont made two successful tests of his faster maneuverable airship at Monte Carlo.
- Died:
  - Eugene du Pont, 61, American businessman and President of the DuPont Company as the largest supplier of gunpowder to the United States Army (b. 1840). Following his death, his three nephews would build the company into a worldwide chemical conglomerate.
  - Rear Admiral Lewis A. Kimberly, 71, United States Navy officer and former commander of the Navy's Pacific Squadron during the 19th century (b. 1830)

== January 29, 1902 (Wednesday) ==
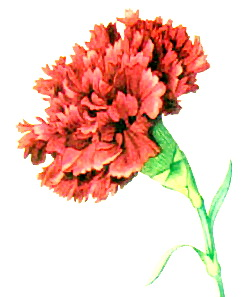

- The birthday of William McKinley, the late U.S. President, was observed across the United States for the first time since his assassination in September. For several decades, McKinley's birthday, though not a holiday, would be observed as "Carnation Day" because the 25th U.S. President had traditionally worn a red carnation in his lapel. Although the tradition would fade after McKinley's 100th birthday in 1943, the event was informally observed as late as 2017.

== January 30, 1902 (Thursday) ==
- The Discovery Expedition discovered previously-uncharted land at the eastern extremity of the Great Ice Barrier, as predicted by James Clark Ross. The land was christened King Edward VII Land.
- A doublet earthquake struck the east coast of Aomori Prefecture, Honshu, Japan.
- At Lansdowne House, London, Britain's Foreign Secretary and Japan's Minister to the United Kingdom signed the Anglo-Japanese Alliance, bringing an end to the UK's policy of "splendid isolation".
- Died:
  - Sanders D. Bruce, 76, prominent American horse breeder and journalist (b. 1825)
  - François Claude du Barail, 81, former French Minister of War (b. 1820)

== January 31, 1902 (Friday) ==
- The British government announced that the casualties in the Second Boer War after more than two years of fighting were 100,701 soldiers and 5,240 officers who had been killed or wounded.
- Born:
  - Tallulah Bankhead, U.S. actress, in Huntsville, Alabama (d. 1968)
  - Alva Myrdal, Swedish politician, diplomat, and writer, recipient of the Nobel Peace Prize, in Uppsala, Sweden (d. 1986)
