= Kitty McEwan =

Australian sports journalist (1894–1969)

Kathleen Agnes Rose McEwan also known as Kitty McEwan (15 March 1894 — 17 August 1969) was an Australian sports journalist, golfer and former superintendent for the Australian Women's Land Army in Victoria.

She is believed to have been the first female sports journalist in Australia.

== Biography ==
McEwan was born in Surrey Hills in Melbourne and was the daughter of John McEwan, a land agent, and his wife Mary Maria ('Minnie'), née Fowler. She attended school at Ormiston Ladies' College, which was local to her home, and as a child developed a passion for golf and became a member for local clubs.

McEwan was the Commonwealth Golf Club champion is 1925 and 1926 and captain in 1926 and the winner of the club trophy for the Riversdale Golf Club in 1933; she once hit a whole in one. She was also the driving force behind the creation of the Women's Inter-School Golf Challenge Cup in 1929.

In 1934 McEwan spent six months in the United Kingdom where she worked as a freelance journalist for Australian newspapers and magazines, including the Australian Home Beautiful, the Radiator (published by the Royal Automobile Club of Victoria) and The Sun News-Pictorial. She mostly contributed about women and golf and it was said that she was 'too modest to report her own golfing wins'.

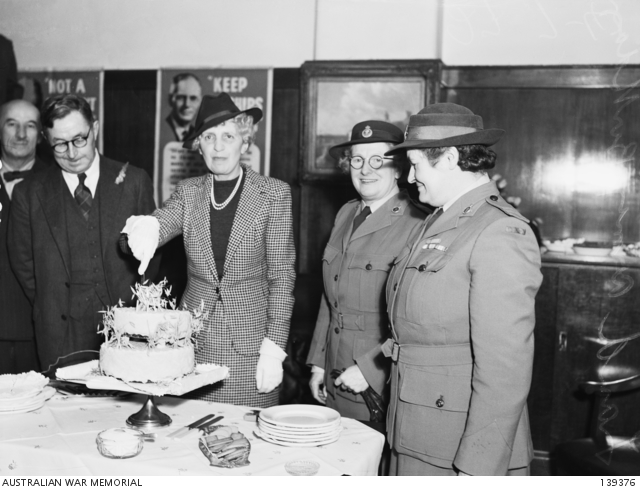
Lady Ruby Dugan cutting the cake at the first birthday of the Australian Women's Land Army, standing on Lady Dugan's right is Kitty McEwan.

During World War II, when back in Australia, McEwan was involved in large scale fundraising efforts for the war and then, in June 1942, was appointed the superintendent in Victoria for the Australian Women's Land Army which was a national scheme to recruit, train and place women, named 'land girls' in rural work to help redress the labour crisis caused by the War. In this role McEwan showed genuine care for the women in the service and advocated for them, this included lobbying the government to provide their basic supplies and also directly with the women's employers. She was known for withdrawing women when their accommodation was substandard. In this role she was responsible for approximately 2,500 women.

McEwan was demobilised in March 1946 and begun to work for The Sun News-Pictorial again, where she was the women's sports journalist, until her retirement in 1966. As a journalist she encourage more women to play sport, regardless of their age, and fought for the regular inclusion of women's sport in the media. During this period she was also involved with the National Council of Women of Victoria (1956–1969) and the Royal Historical Society of Victoria (1953–1967).

She had an additional interest in book collection and left behind an unpublished manuscript: The books they left behind them: collecting Australian works, a profitable hobby which it is estimated that she wrote in 1934.

She died on 17 August 1969.

== Legacy ==
McEwan is remembered through the Kitty McEwan trophy at the Barwon Heads Golf Club and the Kitty McEwan Sportswoman of the Year Award offered by Vicsport.

Kitty McEwan Circuit in the Canberra suburb of McKellar is also named for her.

In 2023 she was inducted into the Victorian Golf Hall of Fame.
