= Dorothy May Marshall =

Australian schoolteacher, war-time welfare-worker and public servant

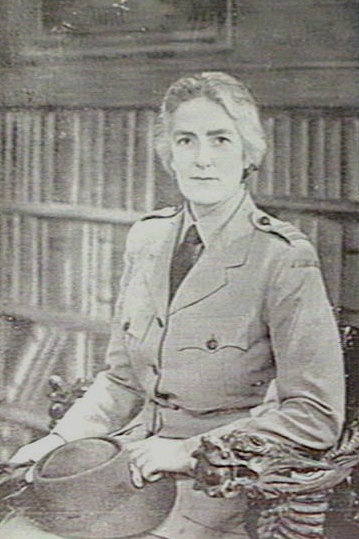
- Land Army 1942
- Born: 15 May 1902; Adelaide, Australia
- Died: 12 July 1961 (aged 59); Henley Beach, Australia
- Education: Adelaide High School; Adelaide Teachers' College
- Occupations: Schoolteacher, war-time welfare-worker and public servant

Dorothy May Marshall MBE (15 May 1902 – 12 July 1961) was an Australian schoolteacher, war-time welfare-worker and public servant. She was the State Superintendent of the Australian Women's Land Army. After the war, she arranged for 500 unaccompanied youths to leave Germany and to emigrate to Australia,

== Life ==
Marshall was born in 1902 in Adelaide, Australia. She was one of the top students at Adelaide High School and then at Adelaide Teachers' College, where she qualified to teach. She spent twelve years teaching in primary schools before she was accepted onto an exchange programme with schools in Carlisle, northern England.

In 1936, she returned to Adelaide, having taught at the Carlisle schools of Bishop Goodwin Girls' and Margaret Sewell Central. She was employed at Croydon Central School until 1939, when she became one of the South Australian Women Teachers' Guild elected advisors. The guild did not support the idea that women could have a career and a marriage. It passed a resolution in 1941 that "the employment of married women, except in special circumstances, should not be supported."

In 1941, she joined the Education department when her jobs began to more quickly change. She was an advisor on vocational training but she was seconded to help with Adelaide Miethke's Schools Patriotic Fund of South Australia. From there, she was lent to the Department of Labour and National Service, where she became the Women's War Service Council's foundation secretary. That body was trying to co-ordinate the use of South Australian women to assist the war effort and Marshall's timely suggestion was that, they needed an Australian Women's Land Army (AWLA). She became the AWLA's State superintendent in 1942. She decided policy and she made all the appointments of the staff at her headquarters Their job was to post women to where they were needed working on farms or in canneries and they were paid a percentage of the wage offered to men. The recruits wore uniforms including hats to show their role.

In 1952, she became a Member of the Most Excellent Order of the British Empire (MBE) for services to child welfare. This was the first Birthday honours announcement by the new Queen Elizabeth II. This stemmed from work Marshall had begun in 1947 when she was employed by the International Refugee Organization. She was working in the British zone in Germany as a welfare officer. Their work involved looking after unaccompanied displaced children. She managed to meet Australia's immigration minister, Arthur Calwell, when she was on leave. Calwell was persuaded to change Australia's policy in order that 500 youths could be allowed as immigrants to Australia.

In 1953, Marshall became the Department of Agriculture's organizer of the Women's Agricultural Bureau in South Australia. During her time, she created the South Australia's first colleges of agriculture open to women. Marshall died in 1961 in Henley Beach.
