= December 1901 =

Month in 1901

<<	December 1901					>>
Su	Mo	Tu	We	Th	Fr	Sa
1	2	3	4	5	6	7
8	9	10	11	12	13	14
15	16	17	18	19	20	21
22	23	24	25	26	27	28
29	30	31

December 10, 1901: The first Nobel Prizes are awarded

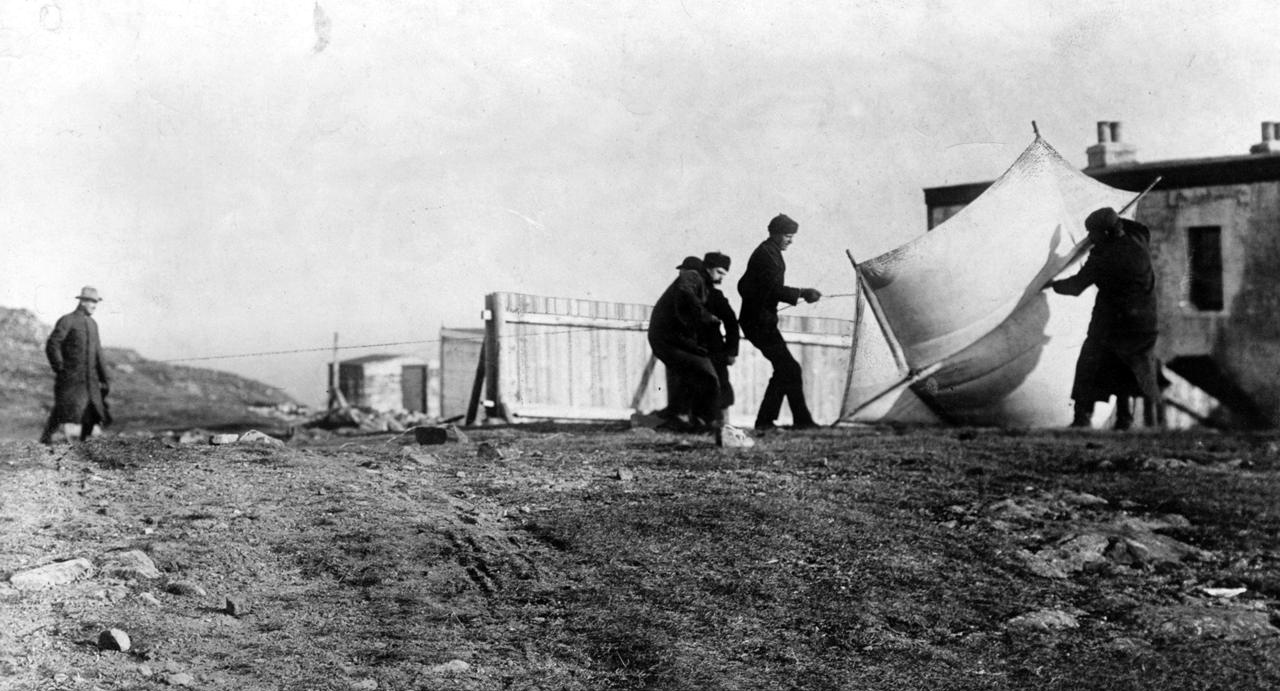
December 12, 1901: Wireless radio received from 1,700 miles away

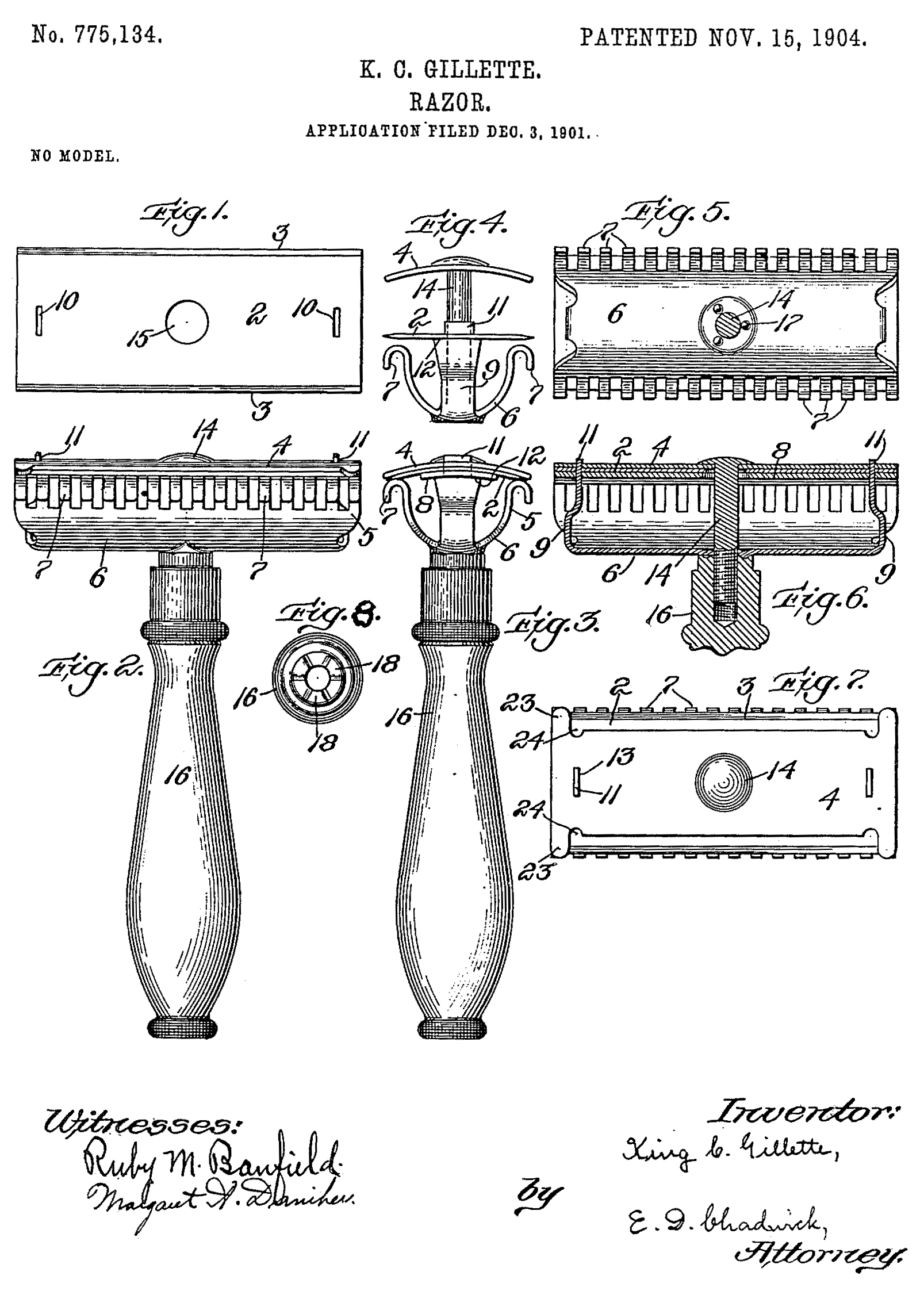
December 3, 1901: Gillette patents disposable razor blade system

The following events occurred in December 1901:

== December 1, 1901 (Sunday) ==
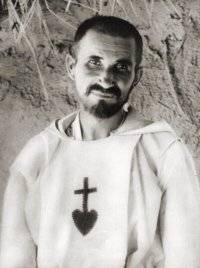
Foucauld

- French Roman Catholic priest Charles de Foucauld began his North African desert ministry, offering his first mass to French Foreign Legion soldiers at the Algerian oasis of Béni Abbès. At the time, "He was the only priest, and often the only Christian, for 250 miles," and, until his murder in 1916, would minister to both French Christians and North African Muslims, as well as purchasing the freedom of slaves.
- A crowd of 100,000 people turned out at Hyde Park, London to demonstrate in sympathy for recently fired British Army General Redvers Buller.
- Died: George Lohmann, 36, English cricketer regarded as one of the greatest bowlers of the 19th century, of tuberculosis (b. 1865)

== December 2, 1901 (Monday) ==
- The United States Supreme Court rendered two 5–4 decisions in the newest Insular Cases before it, holding specifically that Puerto Rico and the Philippines had become American territories as soon as the treaty ending the Spanish–American War had been ratified. Regarding the Philippines, duties on imports from those islands under the Dingley tariff were illegal and had to be refunded because that tariff only applied to foreign imports, and the Philippine Islands "have never been foreign since the treaty of peace." On the other hand, duties collected on imports from Puerto Rico under the Foraker Act were legal, according to the Court, because they had been imposed under a law passed by Congress after the treaty was signed, to create a civil government in Puerto Rico.
- The American steamship Matteawan departed from Nanaimo, British Columbia with a crew of 33 people and a load of 4,800 tons of coal bound for San Francisco and disappeared, apparently the victim of a gale that struck western Canada the next day.
- More than a year after its members were elected, the 57th United States Congress held its first legislative session. The Congress had assembled earlier in 1901 in order to swear in members elected in 1900, but had adjourned without introducing new legislation. Three new U.S. Senators were sworn in before business began, and Speaker of the House David B. Henderson of Iowa was re-elected.
- At Charleston, South Carolina, the South Carolina and Interstate West Indian Exposition was opened for tourists.
- American welterweight boxing champion Kid McCoy put on an exhibition and fought three different opponents in one night, not only winning all three, but knocking out all three men.
- Born: George Owen, Canadian-American hockey player, defenseman for the Boston Bruins and member of the College Football Hall of Fame and the United States Hockey Hall of Fame; in Hamilton, Ontario (d. 1986)
- Died: Lafayette L. Foster, 50, American politician and journalist, President of the Agricultural and Mechanical College of Texas, died of pneumonia. (b. 1851)

== December 3, 1901 (Tuesday) ==
- The Immigration Restriction Act 1901 was passed by the Parliament of Australia, primarily to restrict non-Europeans from permanently entering the country. Under the new law, which was given royal assent on December 23, a person seeking to legally immigrate was required "to write a passage of 50 words in a European language chosen at the examiner's discretion" as dictated by the examiner.
- The British warship HMS Condor sank in a gale the day after it departed from the port of Esquimalt, British Columbia, en route to Honolulu, Hawaii. Wreckage was recovered on the Canadian and American coastlines, and none of the crew of 130 officers and men were ever seen again.
- During a celebration at the Portuguese Indian city of Goa for the feast day of Saint Francis Xavier, an overcrowded launch capsized and sank 50 yards (46 m) from shore, drowning 140 Roman Catholic celebrants.
- The weekly Romanian magazine Sămănătorul was published for the first time, and would endure until 1910.
- The Aero Club of Great Britain (now called the Royal Aero Club) was founded by Frank Hedges Butler, his daughter Vera Butler, and Charles Rolls for "the encouragement of aero auto-mobilism and ballooning as a sport".

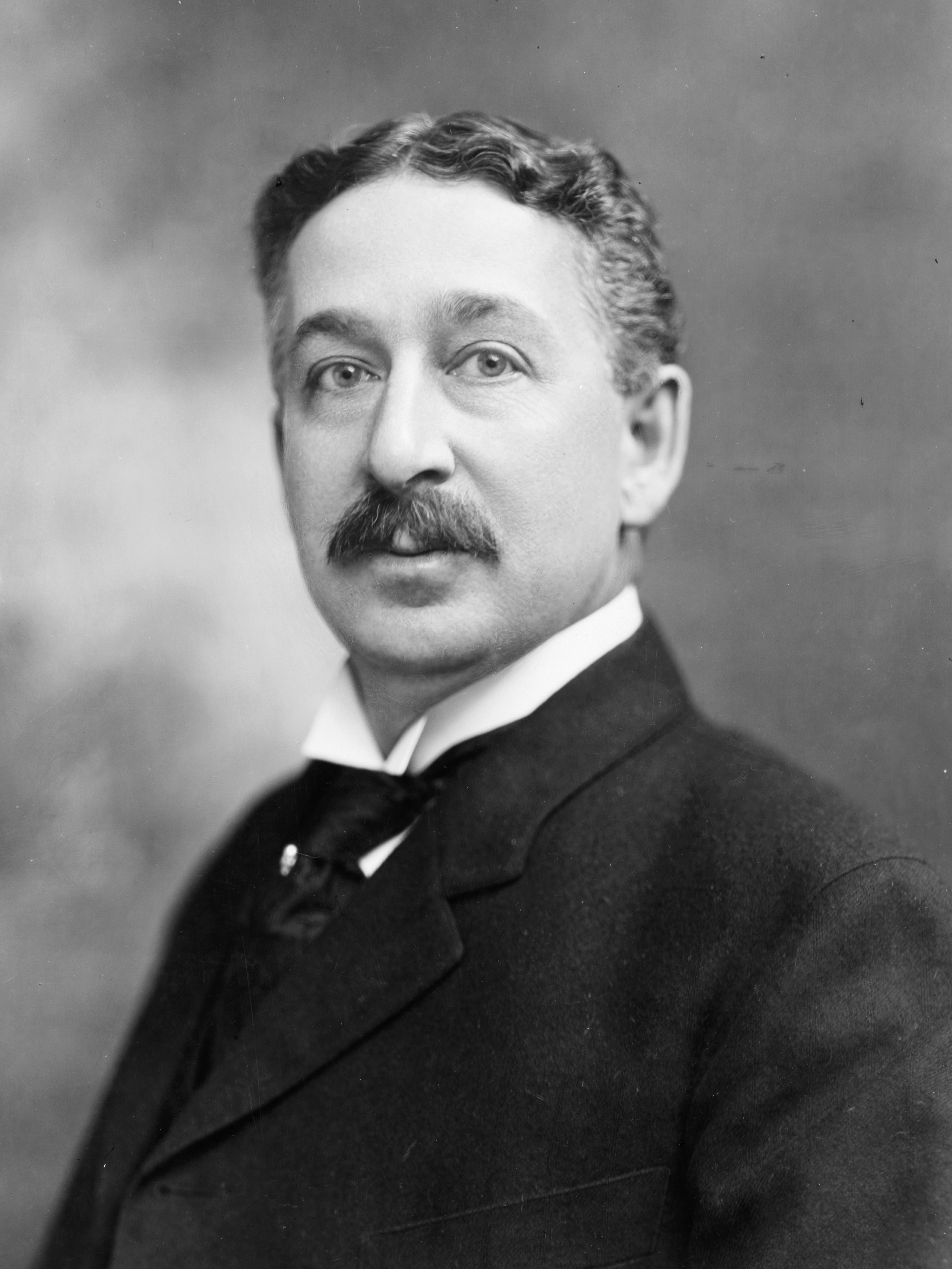
Gillette

- King C. Gillette applied for the patent for the first safety razor that would use disposable razor blades. U.S. Patent 775,134 would be granted on November 15, 1904. Gillette, whose American Safety Razor Company would become the multibillion-dollar Gillette Company, is said to have been given the idea by his employer, inventor William Painter, who suggested that Gillette's success would come from something which could be used and eventually thrown away.
- U.S. President Theodore Roosevelt gave his first message to the United States Congress, but in the manner that was customary for that time, with the text being read aloud by persons other than the President. Roosevelt's speech was more than 20,000 words. With antitrust measures as his first item, Roosevelt asked Congress to create what would become the United States Department of Commerce and Labor with a Bureau of Corporations, as well as an expansion of the United States Navy. He also placed conservation high on the list of national goals, asking Congress to develop irrigation and forestry in the U.S. and, in light of the September assassination of President William McKinley by an anarchist, called for a tightening of immigration laws to bar "all persons who are of a low moral tendency or unsavory reputation".

== December 4, 1901 (Wednesday) ==
- The Hawaiian Pineapple Company was founded by James Dole, in order to carry out his idea of canning pineapples for year-round sale in the United States. The cannery itself would not be completed until late 1903, but Hapco would have half of the American canned pineapple market by 1907, marketing its product under the Dole pineapple brand name. The Castle & Cooke company would acquire full ownership of Hapco in the late 1960s and rename itself Dole Food Company.
- Even while she and the Guangxu Emperor were still on their journey from Xi'an back to Beijing, they issued an Imperial Decree rescheduling civil service examinations that had been postponed because of the foreign intervention in China in the aftermath of the Boxer Rebellion.
- The last Broadway production to be staged in New York City's Lyceum Theatre, Clyde Fitch's play The Girl and the Judge, began a 125 performance run. The Lyceum would close in 1902 after the completion of the Fitch play.
- A spokesman for Stanford University in California announced that the Stanford Cardinal football team would play a postseason game against the unbeaten University of Michigan team on New Year's Day in Pasadena, California. Michigan coach Fielding H. Yost had coached Stanford in the 1900 season, before being hired at Michigan, but had sent a letter to the Stanford administration urging a holiday date for a game between the two universities. At the same time, the organizers of Pasadena's inaugural "Fiesta of Flowers and Beauty" had been anxious to include an east vs. west college football match as part of the festival, and had negotiated with Michigan and with the University of California, which finished the 1901 season at 9–0–1, but "was not enthusiastic on the subject" of a New Year's Day match up. Thus, the 3–2–2 Stanford Cardinals were invited as the western representative. On January 1, 1902, Michigan would win the very first Rose Bowl Game.

== December 5, 1901 (Thursday) ==
- After being kept secret during United States Senate hearings, the text of the recently signed Hay–Pauncefote Treaty, and the details of the agreement with the United Kingdom about the Isthmian Canal, were revealed to the public.
- At Waltham, Massachusetts, the Waltham Watch Company offered its employees a one-hour reduction in the work week without a reduction of pay.
- American stage actor and Yiddish theatre star Jacob Pavlovich Adler debuted a Yiddish version of William Shakespeare's play, The Merchant of Venice, at the People's Theater in New York City. The production, titled Shylock, was edited to "cut the original text to heighten the leading character's importance", a formidable task since the Jewish moneylender Shylock "appears in only five scenes out of twenty," theater historian Joel Berkowitz would comment later, adding, "To make him the central character in terms of stage time requires a reworking of the plot" and "a restructuring of the text."
- Born:
  - Walt Disney, American animator and film producer, founder of The Walt Disney Company, creator of Mickey Mouse; in Chicago (d. 1966)
  - Milton H. Erickson, American psychiatrist; in Aurum, Nevada (d. 1980)
  - Werner Heisenberg, German theoretical physicist, 1932 Nobel Prize laureate; in Würzburg (d. 1976)
- Died: Karl von Hegel, 88, German historian (b. 1813)

== December 6, 1901 (Friday) ==
- The secret Turkish organization Committee of Union and Progress, composed of members of the Young Turks movement, approved a plan to carry out the assassination of Abdul Hamid II, the Sultan of the Ottoman Empire. One of the people at the meeting, however, was a spy for the Sultan, and informed security forces, who shut down the CUP's center in Istanbul.
- The French Parliament passed a law allowing the French government to borrow against the Chinese indemnity payments that it expected would be made over the next 39 years, and directed the immediate payment of the French military for the expedition costs and the reimbursement for French missionaries, industrialists and private individuals who suffered damages during the Boxer Rebellion.
- Austria's Reichsrath, the lower house of the Austrian side of the Austria-Hungary empire, rejected a bill to establish a university for its Slav minority.
- The London Society for Promoting Christianity Amongst Jews received a transfer of land holdings in Haifa, then a part of Palestine, from David Christian Joseph, a former Jew who had converted to Christianity and founded a Christian mission in Haifa.
- The first five people to venture to the new Finnish colony on British Columbia's Malcolm Island, Sointula, departed Nanaimo on a 175-mile journey by sailboat. One of the men, Johan Mikkelson, was injured when his shotgun misfired, and had to be dropped off at Alert Bay for treatment, but the other four (Teodor Tanner, Kalle Hendrikson, Otto Ross and Malakias Kytomma) arrived at the island on December 15.
- A mishandled execution at Danville, Arkansas, left the victim alive even after he had been removed from the scaffold. Bud Wilson, a prisoner who had killed a guard at the Yell County jail, was hanged at 9:45 in the morning, and, 20 minutes later, lowered into a coffin. "Before the lid was placed upon the coffin," a report the next day noted, "the body began moving about. Wilson opened his eyes and his whole frame shook with tremors." Rather than rendering him medical treatment, the county deputies saw to it that he was "carried up the steps to the scaffold for the purpose of hanging him again", but he died from his injuries before he could be executed.
- Born: Carl Langbehn, German lawyer and resistance leader who was hanged for treason after making a secret trip to Switzerland to meet with the American OSS; in Padang, Dutch East Indies (d. 1943)

== December 7, 1901 (Saturday) ==
- The United Kingdom and Germany delivered an ultimatum to the government of Venezuela, to reach a new agreement with the investors of their two nations who had purchased Venezuelan bonds in 1881 and 1896, respectively, without receiving the stated return. Venezuelan President Cipriano Castro was given 48 hours to agree to the terms, or to face a blockade of his nation's ports by the Royal Navy and the Imperial German Navy.
- Japan's cabinet voted unanimously to enter into an alliance with the United Kingdom, and the Anglo-Japanese Agreement would be signed on January 30, 1902.
- An auxiliary unit was organized from former opponents to fight for the British Army in the Second Boer War against the Transvaal and Orange River nations. The "National Scouts" were composed of Afrikaner prisoners of war and defectors, and by the end of the war, one-fifth of the Afrikaners in the war were fighting on the British side.
- Born: Troy Sanders, American film score composer; in Atlanta (d. 1959)
- Died: Martin Wells Knapp, 48, American Methodist minister and Holiness movement evangelist, and founder of God's Bible School and College in Cincinnati and the Pilgrim Holiness Church, from typhoid fever (b. 1853)

== December 8, 1901 (Sunday) ==
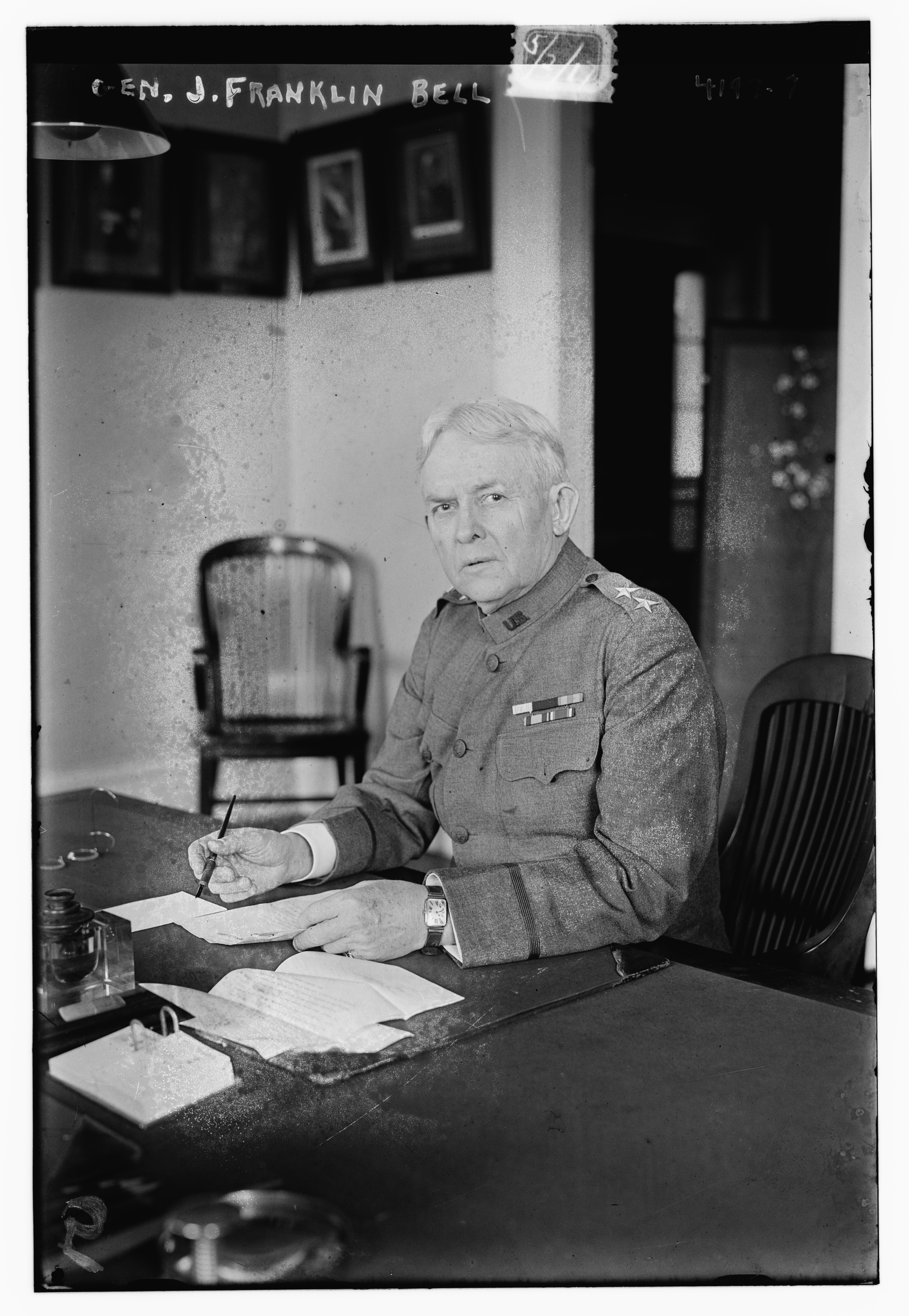
Colonel Bell

- United States Army Colonel J. Franklin Bell issued an order establishing concentration camps (which he referred to as "protected zones") on the Philippine island of Luzon in the Batangas region. Citing the Army's General Order 100, and its directive to protect local residents from undue hardship, Bell directed all post commanders to establish the zones in each town, where people in "sparsely settled areas and outlying barrios" would be required to live. Under the order, all affected Filipinos were given 20 days to move their families, food, and possessions (including livestock) to the zones; property left outside the zones after December 28 could be confiscated or destroyed, and males who defied the order were subject to arrest, and to being shot if they resisted.
- Born:
  - Gerald Lankester Harding, British archaeologist who worked to bring public attention to the Dead Sea Scrolls; to British parents in Tientsin, China (d. 1979)
  - Manuel Urrutia Lleó, President of Cuba for the first six months after Fidel Castro came to power; in Yaguajay (d. 1981)
  - Arthur Leslie, British television actor best known for his role on Coronation Street; in Newark-on-Trent, Nottinghamshire (d. 1970)
  - Irene, American costume designer for film and nominee; as Irene Maud Lentz (later Irene Gibbons); near Baker, Montana (committed suicide, 1962)
  - Carol Dempster, American silent film actress; in Duluth, Minnesota (d. 1991)
  - Caryl Brahms, English film, radio and television scriptwriter, in Croydon, London

== December 9, 1901 (Monday) ==
- The Foreign Minister of Nicaragua and United States Ambassador William L. Merry signed an agreement at Managua, with Nicaragua giving a perpetual lease to the United States for a six mile wide section between the Atlantic and Pacific Oceans for purposes of building the Nicaragua Canal.
- Four hundred men were killed in a battle at Honda, Colombia, on the Isthmus of Panama, as Colombian Army troops defeated revolutionists led by General Marin.
- Gabriele D'Annunzio's play Francesca da Rimini premiered at the Teatro Costanzi in Rome.
- American soprano Bessie Abott made her operatic debut, singing at the Paris Opera.
- The Hackney Empire Theatre opened in London.
- The patent application for the windowed envelope was filed by inventor Americus F. Callahan of Chicago, who realized that the name and address of the recipient of correspondence would not have to be typed twice if part of the envelope was transparent. In order to reduce the "labor and expense in addressing envelops [sic]", Callahan wrote in his application, "the obverse side of the envelop is provided with a section of transparent material as, for example, very thin rice paper through which the sending address upon the inclosure [sic] may be readily observed, the address being so placed upon the inclosure as to register with this transparent section of the envelop." Callahan was granted U.S. Patent No. 701,839 on June 10, 1902, and would have exclusive manufacturing rights to the concept until 1919.
- Born:
  - Jean Mermoz, pioneer French aviator; in Aubenton, Aisne département(disappeared at sea, 1936)
  - Hermann Blenk, Germon aeronautical engineer; in Bad Hersfeld. 1936, (d. 1995)
  - Paul Voigt, British inventor of sound equipment (d. 1981)
  - Carlotta Corpron, American photographer and pioneer in abstract photography; in Blue Earth, Minnesota (d. 1988)
  - Ödön von Horváth, Hungarian-born German playwright and novelist; in Rijeka, Austria-Hungary (now part of Croatia) killed in accident, 1938)

== December 10, 1901 (Tuesday) ==
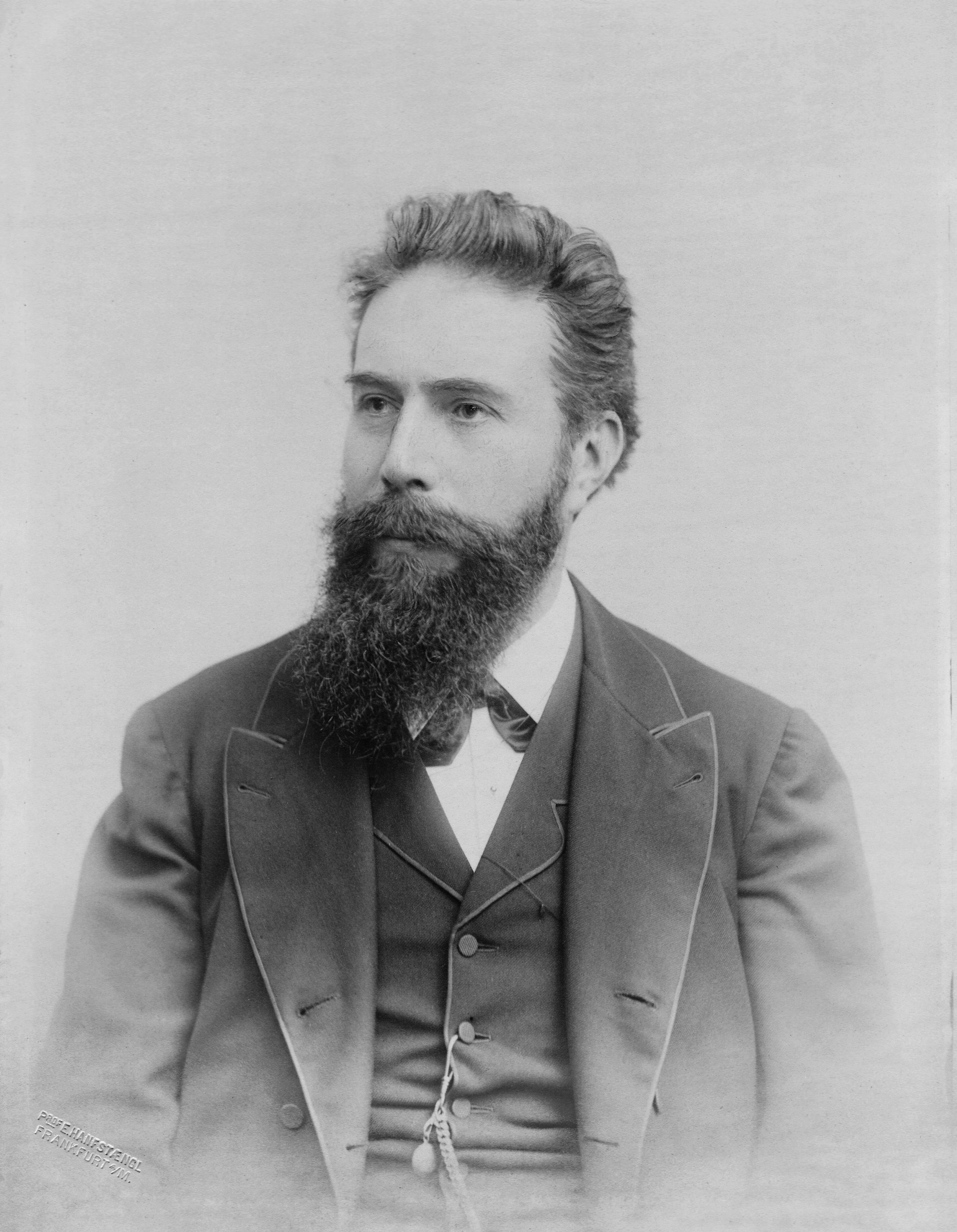
Roentgen

- The first-ever Nobel Prizes were announced, with x-ray discoverer Wilhelm Röntgen receiving the first Nobel Prize in Physics, Emil von Behring being awarded the prize in medicine for his discovery of the first diphtheria antitoxin, Jacobus Henricus van 't Hoff pioneering work in physical chemistry earning him the chemistry prize, Henry Dunant and Frédéric Passy sharing the peace prize, and Sully Prudhomme winning the prize in literature. The bestowal of the prizes came on the fifth anniversary of the December 10, 1896, death of Alfred Nobel.
- Andrew Carnegie announced his offer to donate $10,000,000 to the United States government for the creation and maintenance of what is now the Carnegie Institution for Science.
- Joseph W. Jones was granted U.S. Patent No. 688,739 for his invention, "Production of sound-records", which was purchased immediately by the Columbia Phonograph Company for production of its disc-shaped Graphophone records. At the age of 25, Jones was paid $25,000 (roughly $675,000 in 2016).
- Thomas N. Hart lost his bid for re-election as Mayor of Boston, with Democrat Patrick A. Collins winning by a large majority.
- France's Chamber of Deputies voted, 434 to 125, to grant bounties on all French merchant vessels.
- The British Government announced that King Edward's coronation would take place on June 26, 1902.

== December 11, 1901 (Wednesday) ==
- The first Pergamon Museum, an attempt to create a replica of the Pergamon Altar excavated in Turkey by German archaeologist Carl Humann, opened its doors in Berlin near the Spree River. The building, designed by Fritz Wolff, was only temporary until a larger version could be opened on Museumsinsel (Museum Island) in the middle of the river.
- The American Federation of Catholic Societies was founded at a meeting in Cincinnati after members amended the initial proposal to exclude women from a federation of all the Roman Catholic societies in the United States. T. B. Minahan of Ohio was elected the AFCS's first President, defeating Thomas W. Fitzgerald of New York by a 143–42 margin.
- Born:
  - John Moors Cabot, American diplomat; in Cambridge, Massachusetts (d. 1981)
  - George Mantello, Hungarian diplomat who worked at El Salvador's consulate to Switzerland during World War II, and saved thousands of Hungarian Jews during The Holocaust by providing them fake Salvadoran citizenship documents; in Lekence, Austria-Hungary (now Lechința, Romania) (d. 1992)
  - Michael Oakeshott, English philosopher; in Chelsfield, Kent (d. 1990)

== December 12, 1901 (Thursday) ==
- Millicent Fawcett and the "Ladies' Commission" that had been sent by the British Government to follow up on the reports by Emily Hobhouse of mistreatment of internees at concentration camps in South Africa, completed its report, confirming many of Miss Hobhouse's statements.
- Guglielmo Marconi received the first trans-Atlantic radio signal, sent 1,700 miles (2,700 km) from Poldhu in Cornwall, England to Signal Hill in St. John's, Newfoundland and Labrador in Canada. It was the letter "S" ("..." in Morse code). The breakthrough would be announced to the world three days later, on December 14. Marconi said in a statement, "On arriving in Newfoundland and installing my station on Signal Hill, the entrance to St. John's, I sent up kites every day this week with the vertical aerial wire appended, by which our signals are received. I had previously cabled to Cornwall Station to begin sending the prearranged signal. Tuesday my kite broke away and nothing resulted. Wednesday, however, I had better luck. My arrangement was for Cornwall to send at five-minute intervals between 3 and 6 o'clock p.m. the Morse letter 'S', which consists of three dots. The hours named were equivalent to from noon to 3 p.m. at St. Johns, and on Wednesday, during the hours, myself and my two assistants received these signals under such conditions as assured us they were genuine... on Thursday, we tried again during the same hours and were again rewarded with audible signals, though fainter than on Wednesday." "[W]hile some scientists still debate the technical detail of that experiment," an author would note later, "there was no doubt that the principle of wireless communication had arrived on a transatlantic scale... This was a utility, and would prove itself beyond argument as a vital aid to shipping and military communication."

== December 13, 1901 (Friday) ==
- British geologist John Walter Gregory began his expedition to the fossil beds of Lake Eyre in South Australia, departing on a two-day railroad journey from Adelaide to Hergott Springs, and thence by camel caravan across the desert to the dead lake. Eyre would later write of his findings in his book The Dead Heart of Australia.
- Nearly three months after being sworn in as President of the United States, Theodore Roosevelt was found entitled to a fortune of at least $100,000 from his uncle, Cornelius Van Schaack Roosevelt, Jr., who had died in 1887. During the 14 years that followed, the will of the President's uncle had been in litigation. The amount of the inheritance— between $100,000 and $200,000 — would be worth between $2.7 million and $5.4 million in 2016.
- Died: Nakae Chōmin, 54, Japanese journalist and author of A Discourse by Three Drunkards on Government (b. 1847)

== December 14, 1901 (Saturday) ==
- The popular French humor magazine Le Rire took a stand against government censorship of French theatre, devoting an entire issue to the crusade (ultimately successful) to remove restrictions on prior approval of scripts and productions.
- The Liga Paulista de Futebol, the longest-operating and oldest soccer football league in Brazil, was founded by teams from various cities in the Brazilian state of São Paulo, to begin play in the winter of 1902.
- Albert Spalding was elected president of baseball's National League in a controversial vote that had seen the eight team owners deadlocked after 24 ballots after more than three days. New York Giants owner Andrew Freedman had four votes (Boston, Cincinnati, New York City, and St. Louis), while Chicago Cubs owner (and baseball equipment manufacturer) Spalding had the other four (Brooklyn, Chicago, Philadelphia and Pittsburgh). At 4:00 in the morning, Freedman and his three supporters left the room for a conference, but Spalding had directed his club secretary to remain in the room to prevent any tricks. Philadelphia Phillies owner John Rogers then called for a vote, ruling that since representatives of five of the eight league teams were present at the meeting, there was a sufficient quorum for a vote under the bylaws, and Spalding was elected, 4–0. Freedman would sue, the vote would be invalidated, and Nicholas Young would continue as President, with neither Spalding nor Freedman ever operating the National League.
- A post office was created for Adaven, Nevada, informally making the Nye County ranching settlement its own town of about 25 people. Originally named "Sharp, Nevada", for the local postmaster, the town would rebrand itself in 1939 by spelling "Nevada" backward. The palindromic village would become one of Nevada's ghost towns shortly after everyone had moved away, and the post office would close on November 30, 1953.
- Born:
  - Marvin Farber, American philosopher; in Buffalo, New York (d. 1980)
  - Berthold Lubetkin, Georgian-born British architect and designer; in Tbilisi (d. 1990)
  - Paul of Glicksbourg, King of Greece from 1947 to 1964, grandson of King George I of Greece; in Athens (d. 1964)

== December 15, 1901 (Sunday) ==
- General Pieter H. Kritzinger, who had led the Boer attacks against Britain's Cape Colony in South Africa earlier in the year, was captured by Britain's Lieutenant General John French.
- The four-masted British sailing barque Sindia ran aground in the beach resort of Ocean City, New Jersey, during a raging blizzard, carrying with it a cargo of fine Chinese silks, 3,000 crates of porcelain and art works reportedly worth two million dollars; the crew had been under the impression that it was sailing into New York Harbor. The 392-foot (119 m) long ship was broken up and although all 33 members of the crew escaped and salvaged as much as they could, "the wreck is now completely buried beneath the beach off Seventeenth Street in Ocean City... under as much as thirty feet of sand".

== December 16, 1901 (Monday) ==
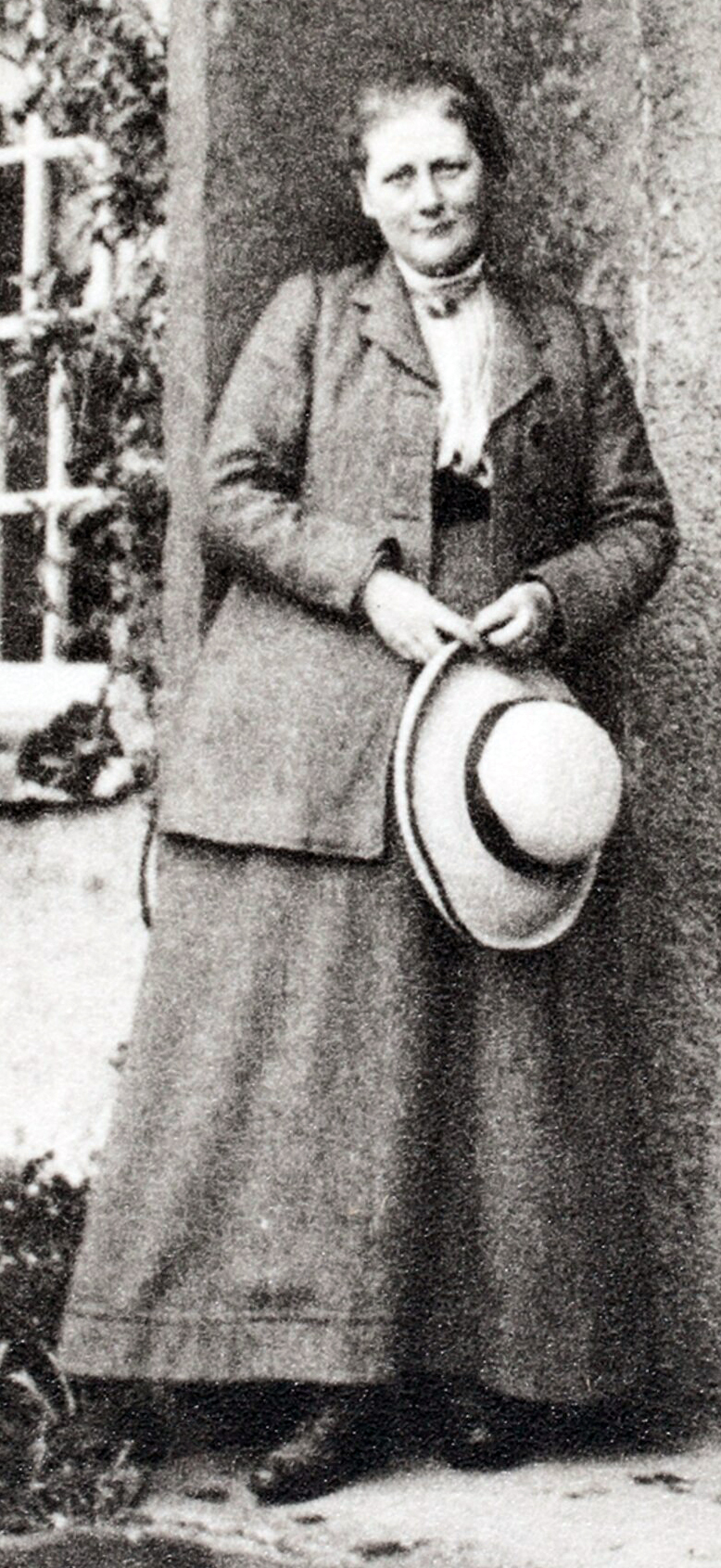
Beatrix Potter

- The classic children's book The Tale of Peter Rabbit, by Beatrix Potter, was published for the first time, after Potter paid for 250 copies following rejections by several publishers. In 1902, the London publisher Frederick Warne & Co. would print Potter's book, and it would go on to become one of the largest bestsellers of all time.
- The United States Senate voted 72–6 to ratify the Hay–Pauncefote Treaty with the United Kingdom.
- Colombia severed diplomatic relations with Venezuela.
- The United States Senate voted to confirm the nomination of Philander C. Knox as United States Attorney General.
- The United States and Denmark announced the signing of a treaty for purchase by the U.S. of the Danish West Indies, which would become the United States Virgin Islands.
- Judge Levenritt of the New York Supreme Court issued a temporary injunction at the request of New York Giants owner Andrew Freedman, blocking Albert Spalding from acting as President of the National League or in any other capacity as an officer, until the matter of Spalding's election of December 14 could be reviewed.
- Born:
  - Margaret Mead, American cultural anthropologist; in Philadelphia (d. 1978)
  - Nikolai Vatutin, Soviet Red Army general who led the recapture of German-occupied Kiev in 1943; in Chepukhino, Russia (d. 1944, killed by Ukrainian rebels)
  - Andrey Vlasov, Soviet Red Army general who defected to Nazi Germany in 1942 and led a division of the Russian Liberation Army in 1945 to fight for Germany against Soviet troops before his capture; in Lomakino, Russia (d. 1946, hanged)
- Died: William Gregory, 52, recently re-elected Governor of Rhode Island, died of Bright's disease (b. 1849)

== December 17, 1901 (Tuesday) ==
- The Privy Council for Canada allowed discriminatory provisions of British Columbia's Provincial Voters Act to stand, barring naturalized Canadian citizens from voting if they immigrated to Canada from Asia. The specific amendment to the provincial law provided that "no Chinaman, Japanese, or Indian shall have his name placed on the Register of Voters for any Electoral District" and further applied to "any person of the Japanese race, naturalized or not". Although the Supreme Court of British Columbia had ruled the law invalid on grounds that only the Dominion of Canada could determine the rights of its citizens, the Privy Council reversed, holding that voting rights were purely a provincial matter.
- The British Academy was founded in the United Kingdom as an unincorporated society for the purpose of promoting "historical, philosophical and philological studies".
- Paillasse, a French language version of the Italian language opera Pagliacci, premiered in Paris. Eugène Crosti translated the lyrics of Ruggero Leoncavallo, who attended the premiere along with French President Émile Loubet and French opera composer Ernest Reyer.
- Born: Janet G. Travell, American physician and medical researcher who developed the concept of treatment of pain by injections in "trigger points" on the human muscle system; in New York City (d. 1997)
- Died: Josep Manyanet i Vives, 68, Spanish Roman Catholic saint and founder of the Hijos de la Sagrada Familia (b. 1833)

== December 18, 1901 (Wednesday) ==
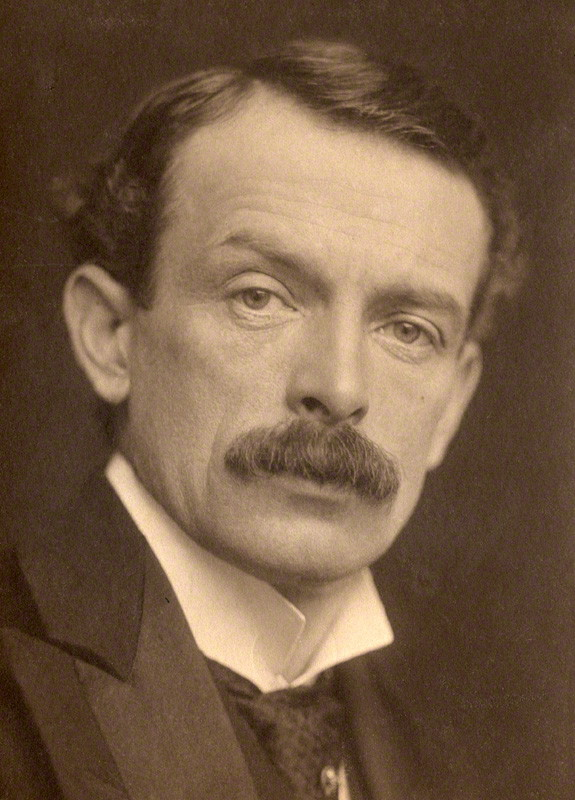
Lloyd George

- Future British Prime Minister David Lloyd George, a Liberal member of the House of Commons, spoke to a hostile crowd of thousands of people in the Town Hall in Birmingham, after being invited by the Birmingham Liberal Association to give a speech against the Second Boer War and in criticism of Birmingham's MP, Joseph Chamberlain. Despite being asked by the Chief Constable of Birmingham to cancel the address because the police could not guarantee his safety, Lloyd George refused and nearly found himself the victim of a riot. There were 30,000 pro-war protesters surrounding the Hall, which was guarded by 350 policemen, and although the "peace meeting" inside was supposed to be attended only by people who had an invitation, many of the 7,000 people inside began shouting and throwing objects as soon as Lloyd George rose to speak. Lloyd George was shouted down after delivering his opening line ("This is a rather lively meeting for a peace meeting"), which caused the crowd outside to being breaking windows and pelting the walls with bricks and other missiles. In order to effect his escape, Lloyd George dressed in a policeman's uniform marched out of the Hall in the middle of a large group of Birmingham police.
- Alfred Milner, British High Commissioner for Southern Africa, and Manuel Rafael Gorjão, the Portuguese Governor-General of Mozambique, signed an agreement for Mozambican workers to labor in South Africa's mines. For each worker supplied, the South African colonial government agreed to pay Portuguese authorities 13 shillings for one year's service, along with an additional sixpence for each month beyond the initial contract, as well as paying half of each worker's salary to Portugal "in gold at a favourable rate of exchange".
- "Barbados Joe" Walcott, a black native of British Guiana, won the world welterweight boxing championship, defeating white boxer James "The Kansas Rube" Ferns, with a technical knockout in the fifth round at a bout in Buffalo, New York. Arnold Cream, an admirer of the Barbadian fighter, would win the world heavyweight boxing title while fighting as "Jersey Joe Walcott".
- Albert Einstein resigned from his job as a high school mathematics teacher in Schaffhausen, Switzerland, to apply for an opening at the Swiss Patent Office in Bern.

== December 19, 1901 (Thursday) ==
- Led by its Governor, Luciano Mendoza, the Venezuelan state of Aragua began an uprising against the government of President Cipriano Castro, who issued a proclamation at his office in the state capital, Villa de Cura. Mendoza's act of secession, with himself as President of Aragua, would lead the next day to other uprisings in five other Venezuelan states.
- U.S. President Theodore Roosevelt issued an executive order placing the northern portion of Puerto Rico's Culebra Island island group under the jurisdiction of the United States Navy, which would establish the Culebra Naval Reservation in 1904. Roosevelt's order covered "Such public lands as may exist on Culebra Island between the parallels of 18°15' and 18°23' north latitude, and between the meridians of 65°10' and 65°25 west longitude.". In 1909, the smaller islands would be designated as a wildlife preserve.
- Along with a message from President Theodore Roosevelt, the United States Department of Agriculture's Division of Forestry issued its study of the 9,600,000 acres of land that made up the proposed Appalachian Forest Reserve. Another 15 years would pass before the first 513,000 acres to be preserved would be set aside as the Pisgah National Forest.
- Born:
  - Rudolf Hell, German inventor and pioneer in electronic printing; in Eggmühl, Germany (d. 2002)
  - Warwick Oswald Fairfax, Australian publisher and philanthropist; in Sydney (d. 1987)
  - Oliver La Farge, American novelist, anthropologist and 1929 Pulitzer Prize winner; in New York City (d. 1963)
- Died: David Boilat, 87, French Roman Catholic priest, ethnographer, artist and educator who pioneered western education for children in the French West Africa colony of Senegal during the 19th century

== December 20, 1901 (Friday) ==
- Gopal Krishna Gokhale, who would soon become a senior leader of the Indian National Congress as well as a leader in the movement for Indian independence from the British Empire, was made one of the four "Additional Members" of the 24-member Imperial Council of the Governor-General of India.
- At Port Florence in British East Africa (now Kisumu, Kenya), the final spike was driven to complete the Uganda Railway, a line of 582 miles (937 km) between Lake Victoria to the Indian Ocean, at the other end of the railway in the Kenyan port of Mombasa. Construction had started at Mombasa on August 5, 1896, and over a little more than five years, had cost the lives of 2,498 laborers, all but five of whom were Asian men imported for the work.
- The day after the secession of the state of Aragua, uprisings against the Venezuelan government were proclaimed in the states Carabobo, Cojedes, Falcón, Guárico and Lara.
- Groundbreaking ceremonies were conducted at Forest Park in western St. Louis, in preparation for the Louisiana Purchase Exposition that would open on April 20, 1904.
- In Mexico City, the Pan-American Congress delegates voted to establish a Pan-American Bank with branches at commercial centers in North and South America.

== December 21, 1901 (Saturday) ==
- Kuwait declared its independence from the Ottoman Empire. In a symbolic gesture of British military support, the commander of a Royal Navy gunboat lowered the Turkish flag so that Sultan Mubarak's banner could be put in its place.
- Led by Robert Falcon Scott, the British National Antarctic Expedition departed on the RRS Discovery from Lyttelton, New Zealand on its way to Antarctica. The Anglican Bishop of Christchurch conducted a farewell service, and hundreds of New Zealanders cheered as the Discovery was escorted from the harbor by a pair of warships, HMS Ringarooma and HMS Lizard. The sendoff, however, was marred by the accidental death of one of the crew, able seaman Charles Bonner, who had climbed to the top of the ship's mainmast to wave to the crowd. Bonner slipped and fell to his death, striking his head on the corner of an iron deckhouse; two days later, the Discovery made an unscheduled stop at Port Chalmers to bury him with naval honors.
- France and Russia signed an agreement dividing the operational zones of their navies' fleets in the event of a war against the United Kingdom. Under the pact, most of the French Navy would be concentrated in the Mediterranean Sea, and second-class battleships and torpedo cruisers would patrol the Atlantic Ocean, while the Imperial Russian Navy would patrol the Baltic Sea and would prepare to use its Black Sea fleet to transport army troops to Egypt.
- President Hutin of the Panama Canal Company resigned, and the Board of Directors was given authorization to sell company properties to the United States government based on the prices recommended by the Isthmian Canal Commission.

== December 22, 1901 (Sunday) ==
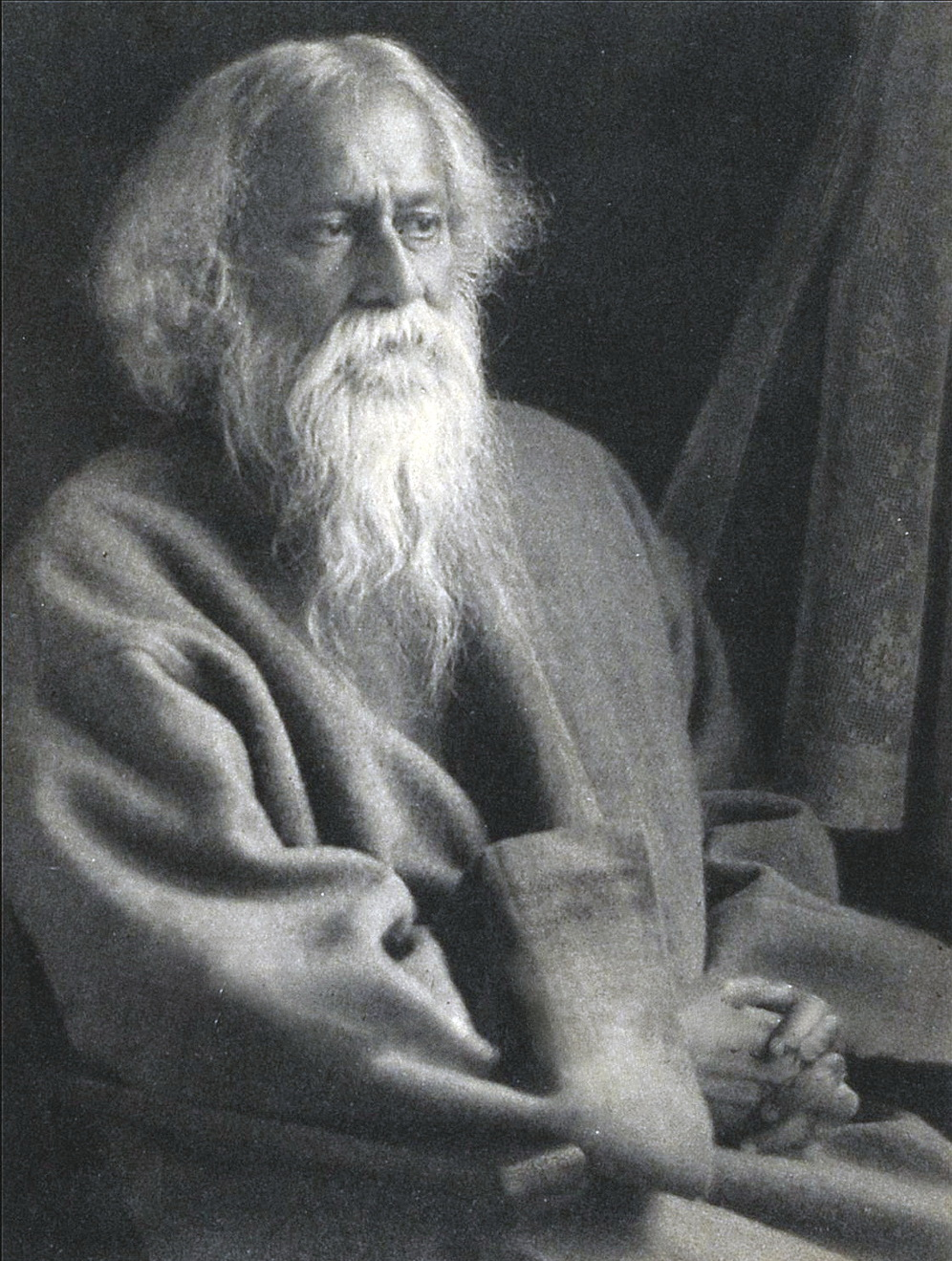
Tagore

- Bengali philosopher Rabindranath Tagore established a co-educational school, the Brahmacharaya Ashram, at Santiniketan in what is now the West Bengal state of India, with five students and five teachers. After winning the Nobel Prize in Literature in 1913, Tagore would expand the school beyond primary and secondary education to create the Visva-Bharati University in 1921.
- Forty-five people were killed when a fire broke out at a public market in Zacatecas City, Mexico.
- Charles Aked, a Baptist minister in Liverpool, said about the war in South Africa: "Great Britain cannot win the battles without resorting to the last despicable cowardice of the most loathsome cur on earth — the act of striking a brave man's heart through his wife's honour and his child's life. The cowardly war has been conducted by methods of barbarism... the concentration camps have been Murder Camps." A crowd followed him home and broke the house's windows.
- Italy's Chamber of Deputies reportedly voted 184–58 to gradually abolish the tax on flour and bread.
- Venezuelan General (and future President) Juan Vicente Gómez defeated rebel Araguan Governor Mendoza in battle at Villa de Cura, crushing the three-day long rebellion there, but Mendoza was able to escape with the aid of rebel General Antonio Fernandez.
- Born: Andre Kostelanetz, Russian-born American conductor of the New York Philharmonic Orchestra and recording artist who composed numerous "easy listening" albums; in Saint Petersburg (d. 1980)

== December 23, 1901 (Monday) ==
- The Immigration Restriction Act 1901 was given royal assent by the Governor-General of Australia, Lord Hopetoun. The Act would promote the "White Australia policy" as its guiding principle, and the dictation test would remain in effect until 1958.
- Because of a shortage of pack animals in Argentina, the government in Buenos Aires issued an order prohibiting the export of horses and mules.
- Chile and Argentina agreed to British arbitration of their border dispute.
- Born: Lin Qiaozhi, pioneering Chinese gynecologist and obstetrician; in Gulangyu, Fujian province (d. 1983)
- Died:
  - Jane Cunningham Croly, 72, American journalist who wrote a popular newspaper column under the pseudonym "Jennie June", died of heart disease (b. 1829)
  - Joseph Henry Gilbert, 84, English chemist (b. 1817)
  - Conrad Schick, 79, German architect and archaeologist who built multiple landmarks in Jerusalem (b. 1822)

== December 24, 1901 (Tuesday) ==
- Resistance on the Philippines' Bohol Island ceased as insurgent chiefs surrendered to the United States Army and turned over their weapons.
- The first Addis Ababa — Djibouti Railway service began as a train arrived in Dire Dawa from Djibouti.
- Two Irish members of the House of Commons, Jasper Tully and J. O. O'Donnell, were given jail sentences for participating in a meeting to urge Irish tenants to not pay rent to their landlords, in violation of United Kingdom law. Another Irish M.P., John Patrick Hayden, had been given a 21-day sentence on December 21.
- Venezuela's General Juan Vicente Gómez fought a second battle against the rebel forces of Governor Mendoza, defeating the rebel forces in an engagement at the town of Desembocadro in the state of Guárico.
- For the first time, the United States Postmaster General allowed a postcard to be labeled as such, rather than as a "private mailing card", words that had been required by a prior regulation that prohibited postcards from being placed in the mail without the required three-word description. However, it would not be until March 1, 1907, when the back of a picture post card would be allowed to contain anything other than the delivery address.
- Died: Clarence King, 59, American geologist and first director of the United States Geological Survey, died of tuberculosis (b. 1842)

== December 25, 1901 (Wednesday) ==
- Chile and Argentina celebrated Christmas with a modus vivendi respecting peace between the two South American nations.
- Boer commandos led by General Christiaan de Wet defeated a larger force of British troops led by Major Williams, killing 68 Britons at the Battle of Groenkop, also known as the Battle of Tweefontein. After the battle, General De Wet would determine that the Second Boer War would eventually result in a Boer defeat, and would negotiate a peace treaty six months later.
- David Belasco's five-act historical drama Du Barry opened at the Criterion Theatre in New York City for the first of 165 performances. It would later be the basis for a film of the same name in 1916.
- Born:
  - Milada Horáková, Czech politician who served in the National Assembly of Czechoslovakia from 1946 to 1948; later executed on charges of trying to overthrow the Communist government; in Prague, Austria-Hungary (d. 1950)
  - Princess Alice, Duchess of Gloucester and wife of Australian Governor-General Prince Henry, Duke of Gloucester; in London (d. 2004)
  - Oene Bottema, Dutch mathematician; in Groningen (d. 1992)

== December 26, 1901 (Thursday) ==
- With the completion of the Uganda Railway, the first locomotive rolled into Port Florence in British East Africa (now Kisumu, Kenya).
- Fourteen people were killed in a railroad accident in Germany near Paderborn.
- The United States Department of the Navy issued the first orders to install wireless telegraphy systems on all U.S. Navy warships.
- The village of Mohall, North Dakota, was founded, and named for its first postmaster, Martin O. Hall.
- Agnes Baldwin Alexander returned from Europe to her native Hawaii, to begin her mission to bring the Baháʼí Faith to the Hawaiian Islands. The day before she had departed Paris, she had received a letter from ʻAbdu'l-Bahá, the religious sect's spiritual leader, encouraging her to win converts to the Baháʼí religion.

== December 27, 1901 (Friday) ==
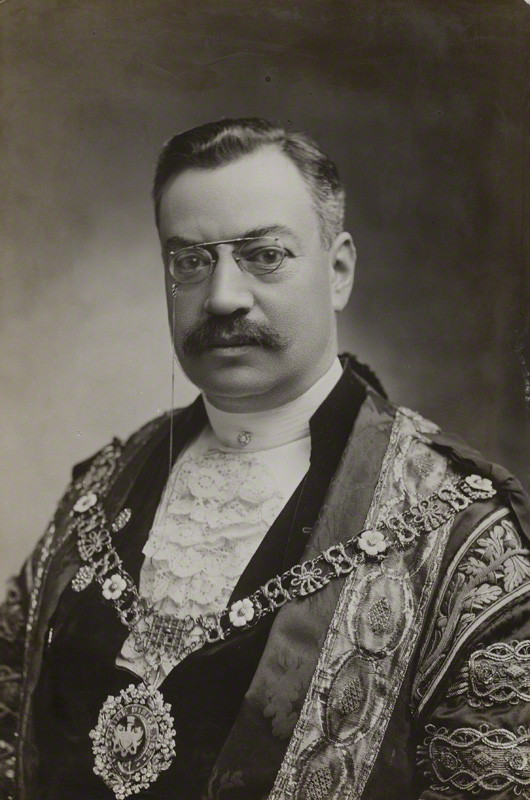
Sir Marcus Samuel

- Sir Marcus Samuel, the founder of the Shell Transport and Trading Company, "did something incredibly foolish", as historian Peter Doran would write 115 years later, transmitting a rejection of a $40,000,000 offer from the Standard Oil Company after getting a release from agreements with Royal Dutch Petroleum's Henri Deterding earlier in the day. "In an instant of transatlantic communication," Doran would note, "all of Sir Marcus's powerful leverage over Deterding vanished. It would prove to be a terrible mistake." The agreement with Standard Oil would have made Samuel an amount that, by Doran's estimate, would have been worth 1.1 billion dollars by 2016 measures.
- The German battle cruiser Vineta arrived at Venezuela, anchoring outside the harbor of the port of La Guaira, after Germany had issued an ultimatum to Venezuelan President Cipriano Castro on paying the money owed to German bondholders.
- Petko Karavelov, Prime Minister of Bulgaria, resigned along with his cabinet.
- The Santa Ynez Indian Reservation was established in Santa Barbara County, California.
- The Senate of Brazil approved the boundary agreement with the United Kingdom's colony of British Guiana.
- Russia and Italy signed a commercial and trade treaty at ceremonies in Saint Petersburg.
- King Edward of the United Kingdom received the Marquis Ito of Japan as the two nations prepared to become allies.
- Born:
  - Marlene Dietrich, German-born American actress and singer; in Schöneberg (d. 1992)
  - Mark Woods, American radio network president who became the first president of the American Broadcasting Company, in 1945, after NBC was forced to divest itself of the NBC Blue Network; in Louisville, Kentucky (d. 1984)
- Died: U. S. Navy Rear Admiral Richard P. Leary, 59, the first American Naval Governor of Guam

== December 28, 1901 (Saturday) ==
- Major Littleton Waller of the U.S. Marines led his men on the disastrous March across Samar in the Philippines, ostensibly to scout the route for a telegraph cable from one side of the island of Samar to the other. He started with three junior officers, 54 enlisted men, and 35 Filipino natives to serve as scouts and carriers of supplies, but had miscalculated the amount of food necessary on the march through the Samar jungle, and was unprepared for the constant rain during the three-week expedition. By march's end, 10 of Major Waller's Marine troops would die, and after a mutiny by some of the carriers, Waller would have 11 of the Filipinos executed without trial.
- The USS Missouri, second of the new Maine-class battleships, was launched from Newport News, Virginia.
- Died: Franz Xaver Kraus, 61, German priest and art historian (b. 1840)

== December 29, 1901 (Sunday) ==
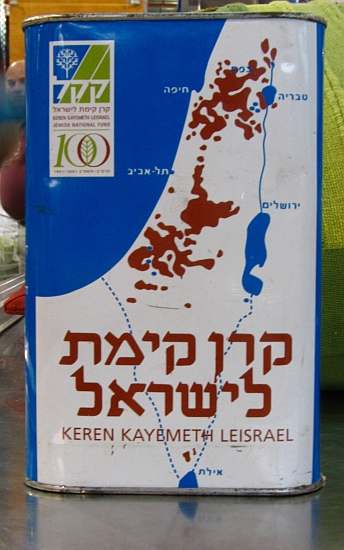
December 29, 1901: A donation tin for the Jewish National Fund

- At the Fifth Zionist Congress, held in Basel, Switzerland, the Jewish National Fund was created to fund the purchase and development of land in the Palestine portion of the Ottoman Empire, particularly the territory that had been occupied by the ancient Kingdom of Israel and Kingdom of Judah. By 1921, the JNF would begin purchasing large sections of land. By 1947, the JNF (referred to in Hebrew as the KKL, Keren Kayemeth Leisrael) accounted for half of the Jewish-owned land in Palestine, and after Israel's independence in 1948, it changed its focus to planting trees and land improvement. "Within a short time the JNF, known worldwide for the little blue-and-white coin boxes that still grace Jewish homes," historians would write later, "was not only buying land but draining swamps, rehabilitating river beds, cutting new roads, planting forests, creating picnic areas and parks, and making desert soil fertile," and over the next 100 years, it would own 17% of the land in Israel (including 500,000 acres (200,000 ha) of forests) and plant 200 million trees. Johann Kremenezky, an electrical engineer from Vienna, made the first donation to the JNF and would become its first administrator a month later.
- Alma Bridwell White founded the Methodist Pentecostal Union Church, originally headquartered in Denver, Colorado, and now based in Zarephath, New Jersey, and carrying the name Pillar of Fire.
- The University of Cincinnati, which would win two NCAA championships (1961 and 1962) played its first intercollegiate basketball game, defeating Yale University, 37 to 9.

== December 30, 1901 (Monday) ==
- The predecessor to the New York City Subway transit system, Manhattan Railway Company, ran the first of its electrically-powered trains in its two-year conversion from steam trains to electricity. The first electric conveyance was an elevated train on the Second Avenue Line, and by the end of 1903, all of Manhattan's elevated trains were electrified.
- A Gentleman of France, the first Broadway success for playwright and producer Harriet Ford, began a run of 120 performances at the Wallack's Theatre. Starring Kyrle Bellew and Eleanor Robson, the historic drama was adapted by Ford from an 1893 novel by Stanley J. Weyman. As swashbuckler Gaston de Marsac, Bellew delighted audiences with action sequences built around his sword fights against 18 challengers.
- Born:
  - Beauford Delaney, American abstract expressionist painter during the Harlem Renaissance; in Knoxville, Tennessee (d. 1979)
  - Dick Porter, American baseball player; in Princess Anne, Maryland (d. 1974)
- Died: U.S. Senator William Joyce Sewell of New Jersey, 66, died from complications of diabetes (b. 1835)

== December 31, 1901 (Tuesday) ==
- Tomás Estrada Palma was elected as the first President of Cuba, receiving 55 electoral votes, compared to only eight votes for his opponent, General Batrolomé Maso. Estrada had not been in Cuba for the past 22 years, and remained in New York City rather than campaigning; Maso withdrew his candidacy on December 23 in protest of Governor Leonard Wood's appointment of a supervisory board composed entirely of Estrada supporters.
- Born: Karl-August Fagerholm, Prime Minister of Finland three times between 1946 and 1959; in Siuntio (d. 1984)
