= Aileen Elizabeth Lynch =

Australian public servant (1898–1983)

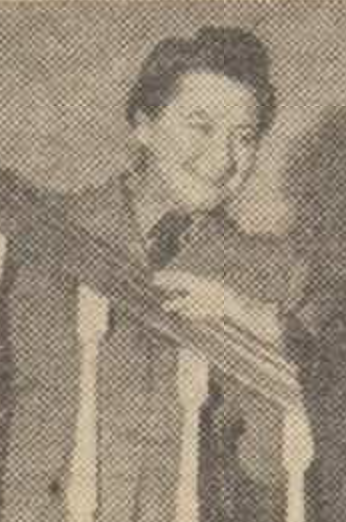
- Aileen Elizabeth Lynch, Women's Land Army, 1945
- Born: Elizabeth Eileen Ryan; May 15, 1898; Waverley, New South Wales
- Died: January 20, 1983 (aged 84); Waverton, New South Wales
- Occupation: Public servant

Aileen Elizabeth Lynch (1898–1983) was an Australian public servant and Women's Land Army superintendent in New South Wales.

== Family ==
She was born Elizabeth Eileen Ryan on 15 May 1898 in Waverley, Sydney. She was the daughter of Irish immigrants Patrick Joseph Ryan (1865-1939), a sewage labourer, and Mary Elizabeth Ryan (1867-1947), née Murphy.

She married Francis Swinburn Lynch (1898-1970), a cable clerk, on 1 October 1927. The couple had no children.

== Education ==
She studied at the St. Clare's Convent in Waverley.

== Career ==
In 1917 she began work as a typist at the Department of Public Works for the New South Wales Public Service. In 1924 she started working for the Premier's Department, first as a part of the migration agreement executive committee, and later in the ministerial office.

In 1941, World War II began and she became part of the Women's Auxiliary National Service, serving as the officer-in-charge of headquarters administration. In 1942 Lynch was appointed to work at the Directorate of Manpower, where she worked closely with land armies. A few months later she was made Superintendent of the Australian Women's Land Army in New South Wales.

In 1946, with the close of World War II, she returned to the Permier's Department and continued to work there until her resignation in 1947. She temporarily worked for the Child and Welfare department from 1960 to 1963.

== Death ==
She died in Waverton, New South Wales on 20 January 1983 and was cremated.
