= Ivers S. Calkin =

- Born: May 29, 1836; Essex County, New York
- Died: February 16, 1902 (aged 65); Muskegon County, Michigan
- Burial place: Oak Grove Cemetery
- Military career
- Allegiance: United States of America
- Branch: United States Army
- Rank: First Sergeant
- Unit: (New York (state)) 2nd New York Volunteer Cavalry Regiment - Company M
- Conflicts: Battle of Sayler's Creek
- Awards: Medal of Honor

First Sergeant Ivers S. Calkin (May 29, 1836 – February 16, 1902) was an American soldier who fought in the American Civil War. Calkin received the country's highest award for bravery during combat, the Medal of Honor, for his action during the Battle of Sayler's Creek in Virginia on 6 April 1865. He was honored with the award on 3 May 1865.

== Biography ==
Ivers S. Calkin was born in Elizabethtown, New York on 29 May 1836 to Ransom Calkin and Rachel Barnum. Prior to his enlistment, he resided in Willsborough, New York as a Mill Wright. At the age of 26, he enlisted as a private into Company A, 2nd New York Cavalry Regiment on 15 August 1862 in Troy, New York. According to his Military Service Record, he was promoted to Full Corporal on 6 October 1863, then promoted to Full Sergeant on 1 November 1863. He spent most of his enlistment assigned to Company A, 2nd New York Cavalry Regiment, then was reassigned to Company M, 2nd New York Cavalry Regiment having been promoted to Full 1st Sergeant on 15 November 1864. His Military Service Records also refer to his rank of Orderly Sergeant. He mustered out of service on June 5, 1865 at Alexandria, Virginia. Subsequently, he married Frances Hinshall in Black River Falls, Wisconsin on October 19, 1867. He later moved his family from Black River Falls, Wisconsin to Montague, Michigan, where US Census Records denote his occupation as Mill Wright. He died on 16 February 1902 and his remains are interred at the Oak Grove Cemetery in Montague, Michigan.

== Medal of Honor citation ==
Capture of flag of 18th Virginia Infantry (Confederate States of America).

== See also ==
- List of American Civil War Medal of Honor recipients: A–F
