= Australian Women's Land Army =

Wartime organisation of women in Australia

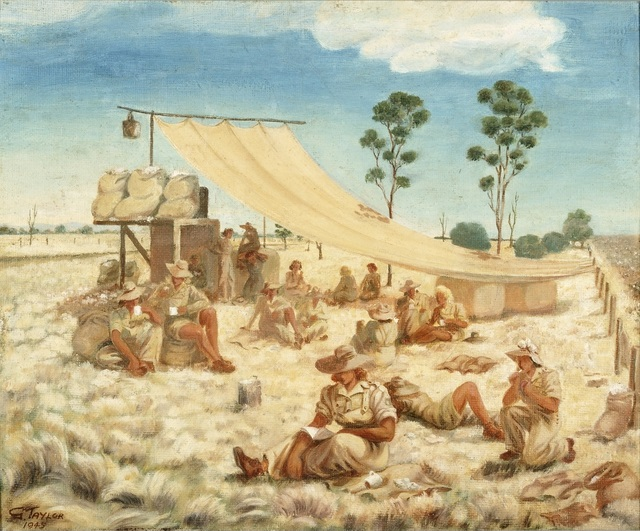
A painting titled Smoko time with the AWLA

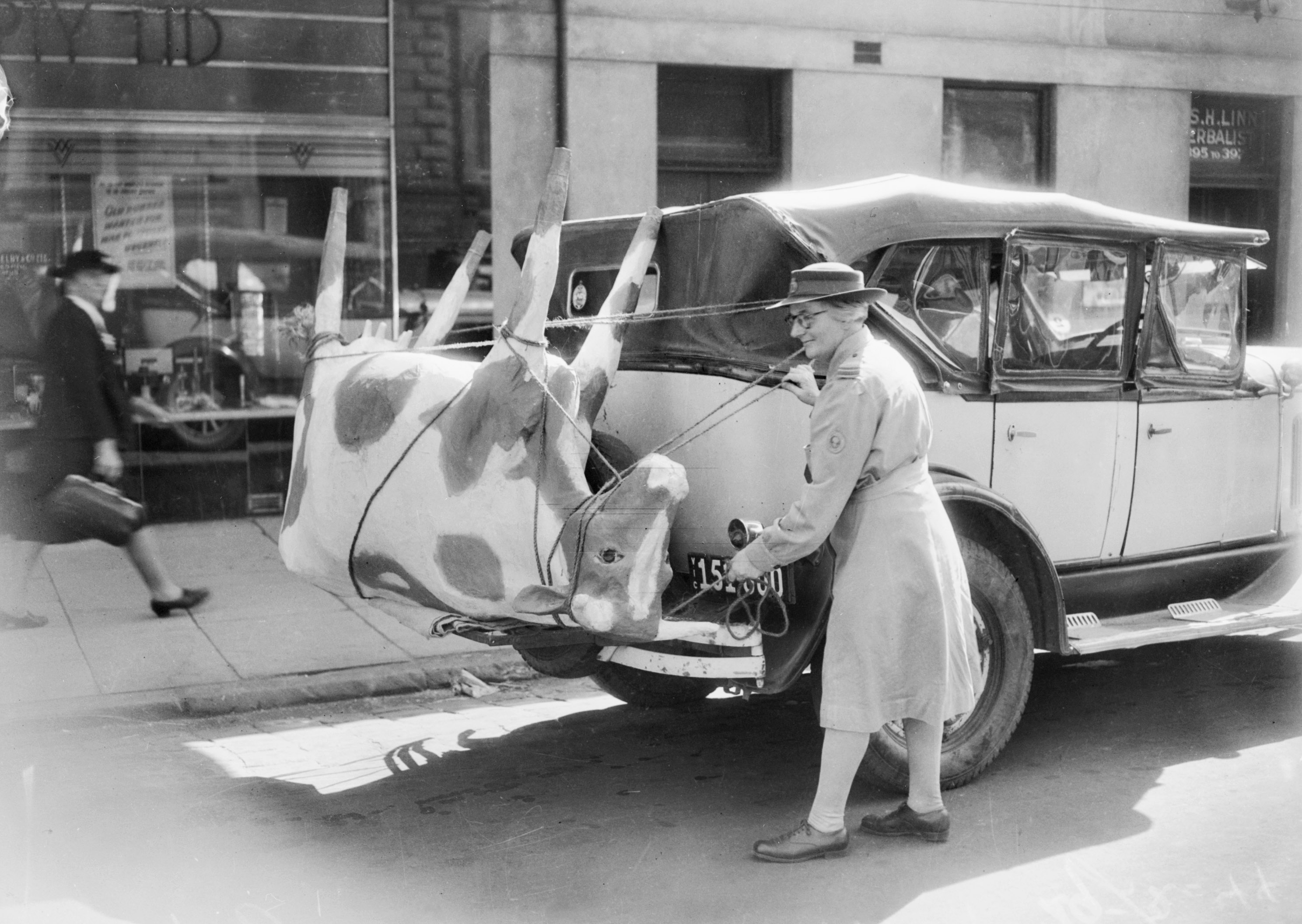
A papier-mache cow, used for milking demonstrations, is being tied to the car by a Field Officer in the Women's Land Army, Melbourne, 1944.

The Australian Women's Land Army (AWLA) was an organisation created in World War II in Australia to combat rising labour shortages in the farming sector. The AWLA organised female workers to be employed by farmers to replace male workers who had joined the armed forces.

When WWII began, the only women’s unit in the Australian Army was the Australian Army Nursing Service. Within three years, women would grow their skills to meet wartime demands and register themselves for enlistment into several more auxiliary service units and dozens of voluntary groups and legions. By 1942, women’s units had been formed across all arms of the defence forces: the Women’s Australian Auxiliary Air Force (WAAAF), the Women’s Royal Australian Naval Service (WRANS), the Australian Women’s Army Service (AWAS) and the Australian Army Medical Women’s Service (AAMWS). By the end of the war, 50,000 Australian women had served in these units, with women employed in over 70 different occupations in the WAAAF alone.

== History ==
The AWLA was formed on 27 July 1942 and was modelled on the Women's Land Army in Great Britain. It was overseen by Lieutenant General Carl Jess. When Japan joined the Axis in 1941 male agricultural labour was recruited into the Australian military to defend the country. To meet the shortfall in rural labour, state and private women’s land organisations began to form under the jurisdiction of the Director General of Manpower. The AWLA disbanded on 31 December 1945. In 1997, many members became eligible for the Civilian Service Medal. Almost a third of women of working age would participate in paid work during WWII, many in roles unavailable to them before the war.

The minimum age for recruits was 18 with a maximum of 50 years of age. Women had to be either of British origin or immigrants from Allied nations. AWLA women were generally recruited from urban areas and were often unskilled in rural work. Members were given farming instruction and undertook work in primary industries, rather than any domestic duties at the hostels in which they were lodged in farming areas. The AWLA reached its peak enrolment in December 1943, with 2,382 permanent members and 1,039 auxiliary members. Women in the AWLA worked an average 48-hour week, with pay starting at the AWLA minimum wage of 30 shillings a week. Permanent members were also entitled to sick pay. As was common at the time, women in the AWLA were paid much less than their male counterparts for the same work. For women more comfortable with “traditional” women’s roles, there were other opportunities to work in hospitality or with fundraising and patriotic groups. Women from the “Comfort Funds” knitted their way through the war, making socks, scarves and mittens, and gathering other items to package and send to the troops. Established service groups such as The Red Cross also enlisted women in new roles, including as part of the Voluntary Aid Detachment where they worked as medical orderlies.

Members of the AWLA also covered a variety of agricultural labours, including vegetable and fruit growing, pig and poultry raising, and sheep and wool work.

The AWLA was planned to function in two divisions:

- Full-time members: These enrolled for continuous service for 12 months (with the option of renewal); such members were to receive appropriate badges, distinctive dress uniform, working clothes, and equipment.
- Auxiliary members: These were available for periods of not less than four weeks at nominated times of the year; such members were to be used for seasonal rural operations, and to receive a badge, working clothes, and essential equipment on loan.

To celebrate the 70th anniversary of the formation, the Australian Government agreed to a range of measures to recognise and thank the 'land army girls' for their commitment and efforts. A reception was held in Parliament House on Monday 20 August 2012 which acknowledged those surviving former AWLA members who were able to attend. Attendees were presented with a commemorative certificate, a commemorative brooch and a copy of a commemorative history publication of the AWLA.

Peggy Williams OAM, a former member of the AWLA led the campaign for proper recognition of all 'land army girls' efforts during the war years. This was acknowledged in a speech given by the Prime Minister of Australia at the Parliament House reception marking the 70th anniversary.

== Notable members ==
- Jessica Anderson
- Faith Bandler
- Florence Hummerston
- Aileen Elizabeth Lynch
- Dorothy May Marshall
- Kitty McEwan
- Beryl McLeish

== See also ==
- Australian home front during World War II
- Australian Women's Army Service
- British Women's Land Army
- Female roles in the World Wars
- Victory garden
- Woman's Land Army of America
- Women's Auxiliary Australian Air Force
- Women's Royal Australian Naval Service
