= Hans Hoffmann (musician) =

German tenor and musicologist

Hans Hoffmann (26 January 1902 – 26 August 1949) was a German lyrical tenor, musicologist and municipal music director in Bielefeld.

== Life ==
Born in Prudnik, Hoffmann first studied musicology at the universities of Breslau, Leipzig, Berlin and Kiel (with Fritz Stein) and was awarded a doctorate summa cum laude in Kiel on 17 May 1927. He also studied violin and singing (in Berlin with Baptist Hoffmann). From 1928, he made a name for himself as a concert singer, in oratorios and passions, but also as an art singer. At the Wiener Musikverein in 1940 he sang the world premiere of Franz Schmidt cantata Deutsche Auferstehung. Ein festliches Lied in the tenor part.

Parallel to his singing career, Hoffmann also worked as a musicologist (lecturer in Kiel and professor at the University of Halle).

Following his move to Bielefeld, he worked there as a choirmaster and Kapellmeister at the Theatre and finally as municipal music director.

Hoffmann died in Bielefeld at the age of 47.

== Publications ==
- Die norddeutsche Triosonate des Kreises um Johann Gottlieb Graun and Carl Philipp Emanuel Bach. (Dissertation). Kiel, Delivered by W. G. Mühlau 1927, 188 p.
- Heinrich Schütz und Johann Sebastian Bach: 2 Tonsprachen und ihre Bedeutung für die Aufführungspraxis, Kassel : Bärenreiter-Verlag [1940] 79 .
- Vom Wesen der zeitgenössischen Kirchenmusik. Kassel Basel : Bärenreiter-Verlag, 1949, 111.
