= Beryl McLeish =

Australian civil servant

Beryl Elizabeth McLeish, (née King; 6 February 1902 – 10 January 1974) was an Australian civil servant and a wartime superintendent of the Australian Women's Land Army (AWLA).

== Early life ==
Beryl Elizabeth King was born on 6 February 1902 in Gympie, Queensland, the eldest child of engine driver Walter Henry King and music teacher Alice Mary (née Marshall). She attended the local school and relocated to Brisbane in 1920 to join the Queensland Public Service, working as private secretary to the under-secretaries of the Department of Labour Industry.

== Personal life and career ==
King married solicitor Edward Francis Pender on 5 August 1939 at the All Saints Church in Wickham Terrace. She became secretary of the local chapter of the Australian Comforts Fund's Queensland division. In 1941, her husband enlisted in the Australian Imperial Force; a year later, King was appointed as the administrative officer of the Australian Women's Land Army (AWLA) in Queensland. The couple filed for divorce some five years later. The AWLA worked to mobilise female workers to replace male workers who had left to fight during the war. McLeish was instrumental in recruiting women, and in overcoming the skepticism of some farmers who were uneasy with having women replace their male workers.

King married 74-year-old grazier Daniel Matthew McLeish on 31 October 1946 at the Ann Street Presbyterian Church in Brisbane. In the 1950s, she moved to Auchenflower, Brisbane where she found an administrative job at Building & Industrial Supplies. She retired in her 60s. Her second husband Daniel McLeish died in 1973, and King herself died on 10 January 1974 in Auchenflower.
