= October 1901 =

Month in 1901

<<	October 1901					>>
Su	Mo	Tu	We	Th	Fr	Sa
		1	2	3	4	5
6	7	8	9	10	11	12
13	14	15	16	17	18	19
20	21	22	23	24	25	26
27	28	29	30	31

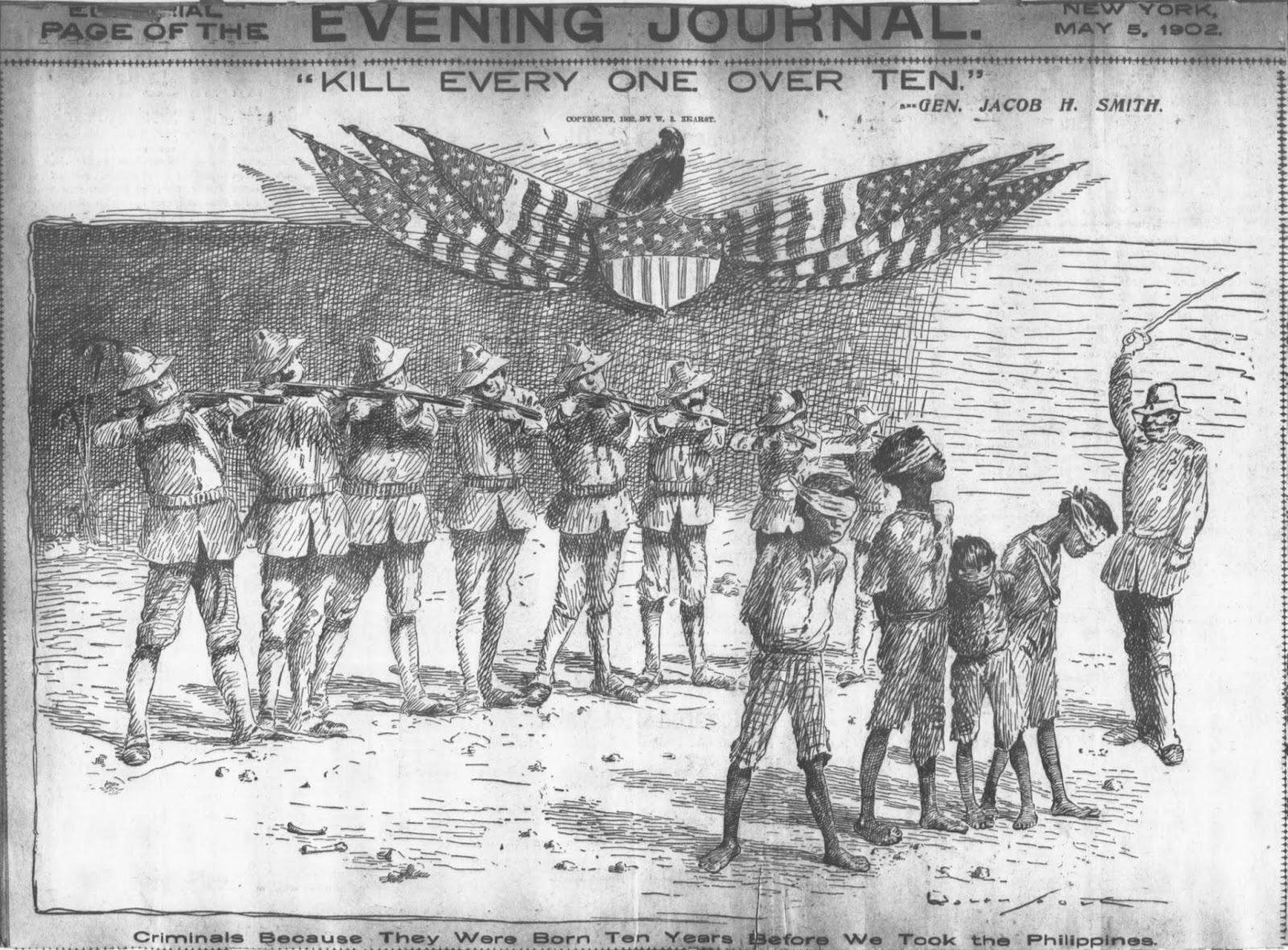
October 23, 1901: U.S. General Smith orders Philippine civilian massacre

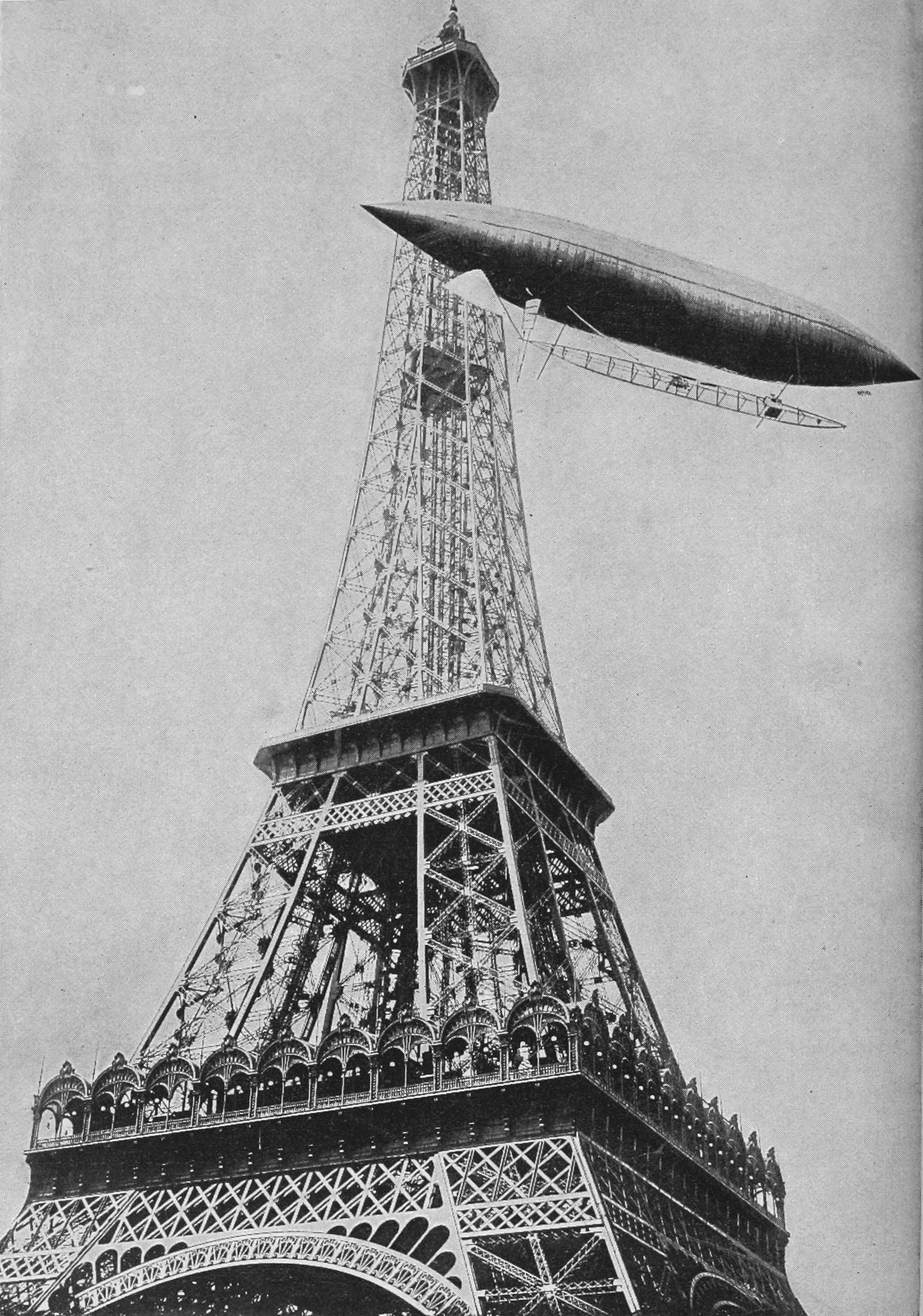
October 19, 1901: Santos-Dumont wins the 100,000 francs Deutsch Prize

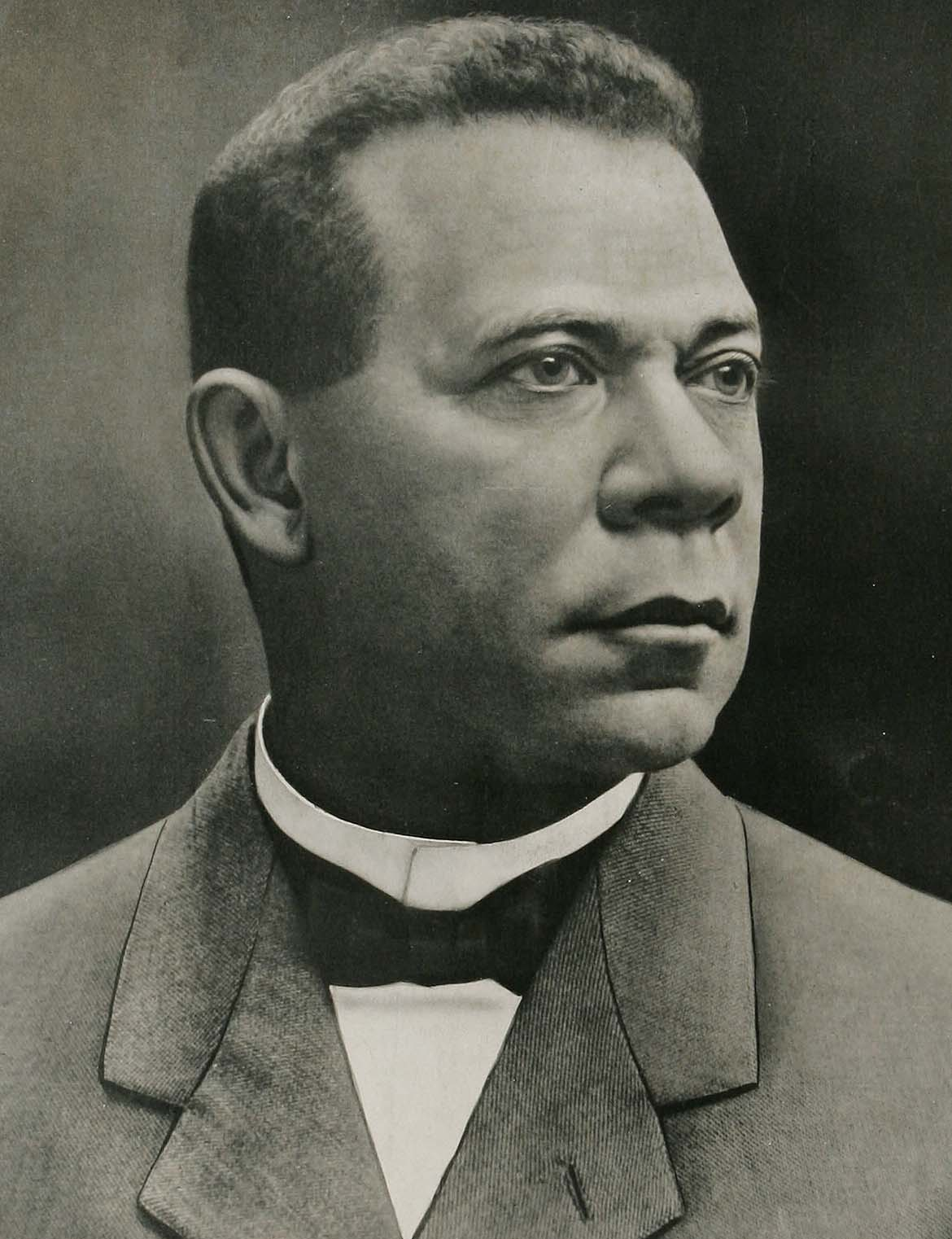
October 16, 1901: Racists outraged after Negro Booker T. Washington dines at the White House

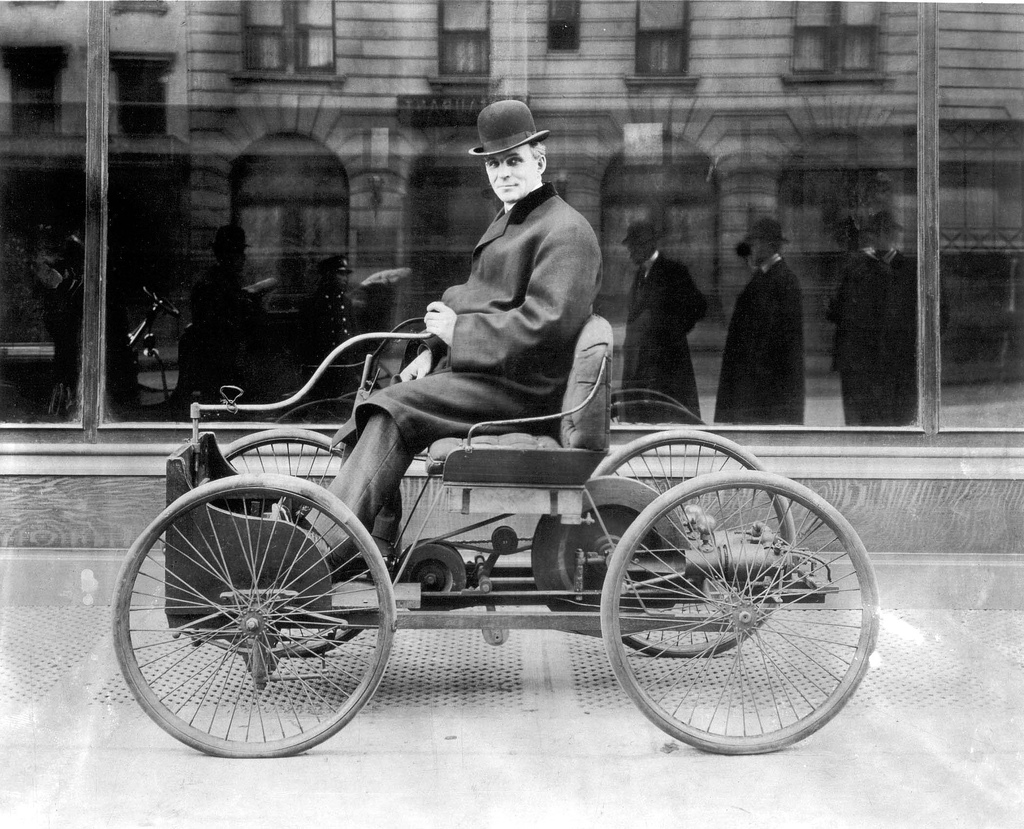
October 10, 1901: Henry Ford wins history-changing race

The following events occurred in October 1901:

== October 1, 1901 (Tuesday) ==
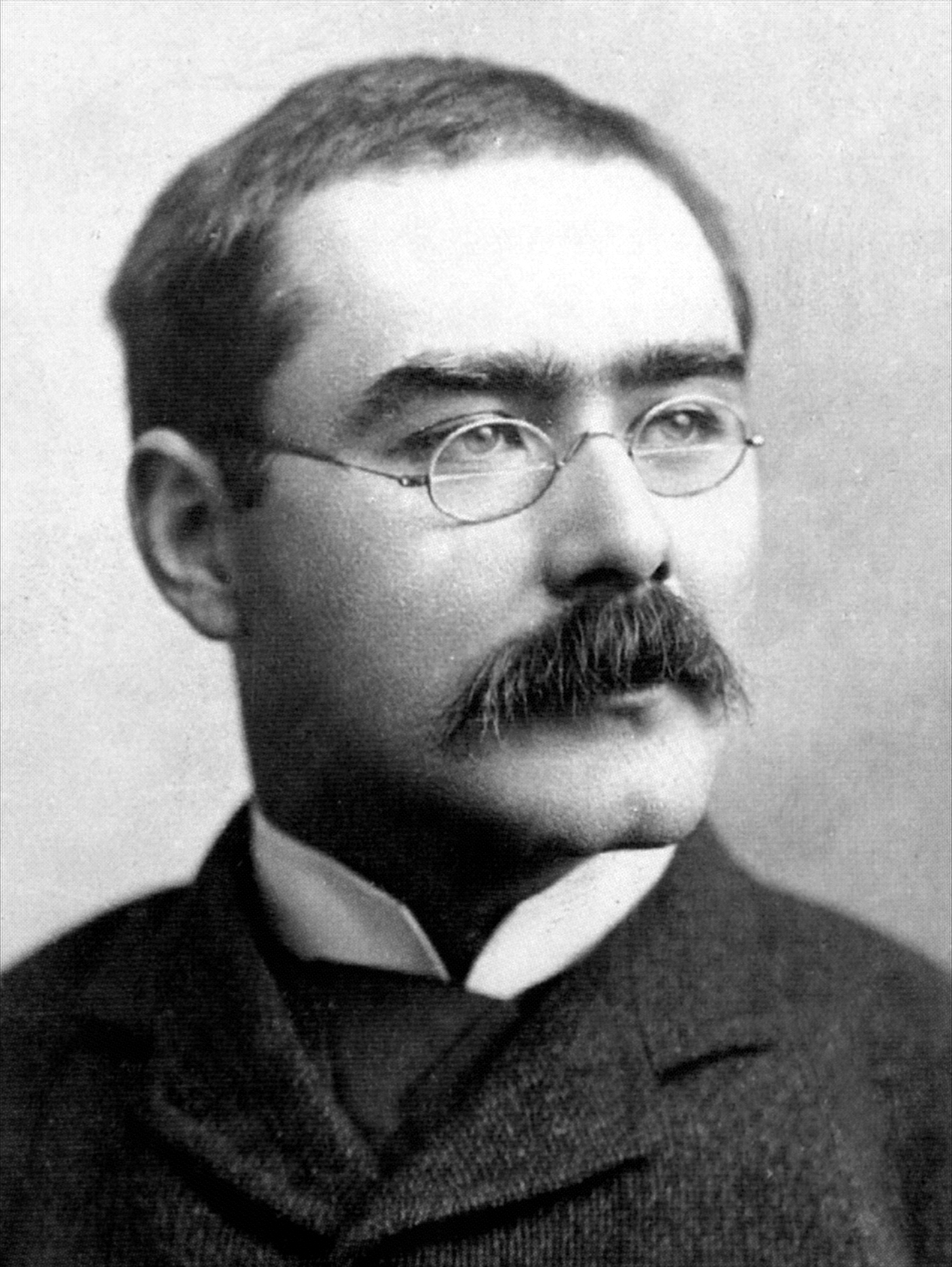
Rudyard Kipling

- Rudyard Kipling's novel Kim, about the life of Irish orphan Kimball O'Hara in British India, was published as a book for the first time and soon became a bestseller. The story had first been printed in monthly installments as a serial in the United States in McClure's Magazine, running from December 1900 to the October 1901 issue, and in the United Kingdom in Cassell's Magazine starting in January 1901. The Macmillan & Co. book in the United Kingdom was sold for six shillings a copy. and by Doubleday, Page & Co. in the United States
- Voters in Connecticut voted overwhelmingly (47,317 to 26,745) to write a new state constitution to replace the one promulgated in 1818. A convention would be held in 1902 and a revised constitution would be drawn, which voters would reject even more overwhelmingly, by a more than 2 to 1 margin (10,377 for and 21,234 against).
- Born: Partap Singh Kairon, India politician and Chief Minister of the Punjab from 1956 to 1964 (assassinated 1965)

== October 2, 1901 (Wednesday) ==
HMS Holland 1

- The Royal Navy's first submarine, HMS Holland 1 (named for designer John Philip Holland), was launched from the Vickers-Armstrongs shipyard at Barrow-in-Furness, England.
- Governor Henry Gage of California successfully brokered a settlement of the San Francisco dockworkers' strike that had tied up the harbor since July 21.
- The National Commission on Indigenous Peoples, still a Philippine government agency, was created by the American occupational government as the Bureau of Non-Christian Tribes with the dual mission of conducting research studies in the ethnology of the Philippine Islands, and investigating and analyzing the conditions of "pagan and Muslim tribes".
- Born:
  - Charles Stark Draper, American physicist and engineer known as "the father of inertial navigation" for his creation of the guidance system for the Apollo crewed space program; in Windsor, Missouri (d. 1987)
  - Kiki de Montparnasse, French nightclub singer and actress, as Alice Prin, in Châtillon-sur-Seine, Côte-d'Or département (d. 1953)

== October 3, 1901 (Thursday) ==
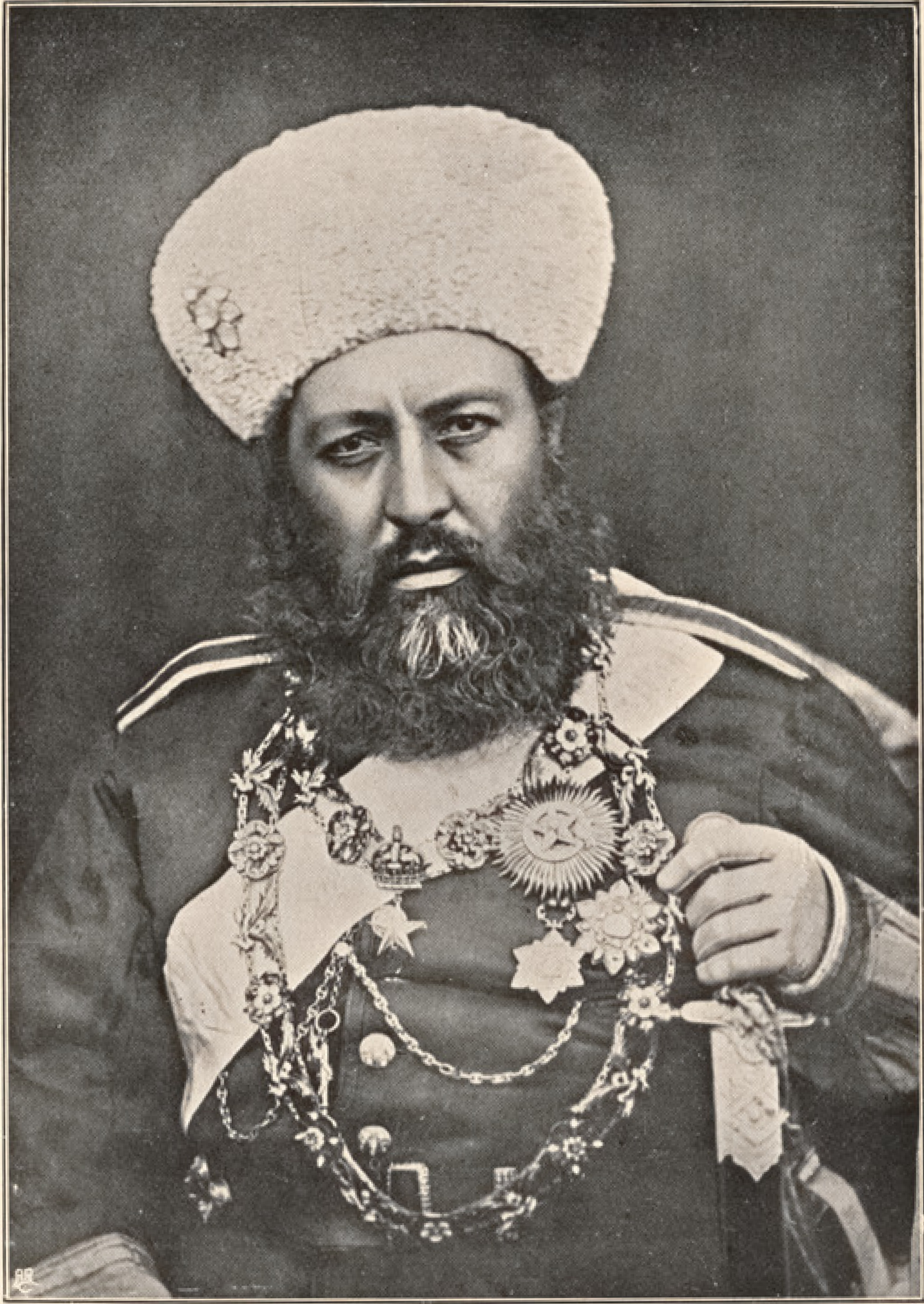
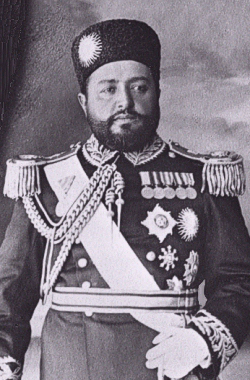
Afghanistan's Emir Abdur Rahman and King Habibullah
- Abdur Rahman Khan, known as "The Iron Emir" for his authoritarian rule as King of Afghanistan, died after a reign of 21 years. His son, Habibullah Khan, announced the death later that morning and became the new King of Afghanistan, giving himself the title Siraj al-Millat wa'd-Din (Torch of the Nation and the Faith), and would reign until his assassination on February 20, 1919.
- Inventors Eldridge R. Johnson and Emile Berliner founded the Victor Talking Machine Company, producing Berliner's 3-minute disc shaped gramophone records and Johnson's modification of the Berliner gramophone that used a spring-driven motor to mechanically spin the discs, as well as an improved sound system and a process for mass-pressing records on wax rather than hard rubber. The disc format would prove more popular than the cylinder format used by Edison Records and by Columbia.
- At the annual meeting of the clergy of the Episcopal Church of the United States, held in San Francisco, delegates from the Diocese of Milwaukee and the Diocese of Colorado presented separate resolutions urging the denomination to change its name to "The American Catholic Church".

== October 4, 1901 (Friday) ==
- The American yacht Columbia, owned by American financier J. P. Morgan of the New York Yacht Club and skippered by Charlie Barr, defeated the British yacht Shamrock II, owned by tea magnate Sir Thomas Lipton, in the third of the best-3-of-5 race series to retain the United States' hold of the America's Cup; Shamrock II actually crossed the finish line two seconds ahead of Columbia but, because of the Yacht Racing Association rules that calculated a 43-second time allowance to the Columbia based on the size of both yachts' sails, Columbia was declared the winner by 41 seconds.
- Born:
  - Gregory Dix, Anglican Benedictine monk and liturgical reformer; in London (d. 1952)
  - Daniel E. Noble, American electronics engineer and inventor of the portable FM radio transmitter for military use; in Naugatuck, Connecticut (d. 1980)

== October 5, 1901 (Saturday) ==
- Hartford, Connecticut, became the first American city to have its electric supply powered entirely by steam, as new technology, a steam turbine driven power generator began operations for the Hartford Electric Light Company.
- Born:
  - Atilano Cruz Alvarado, Mexican Roman Catholic priest who was canonized as a saint in 2000, almost 72 years after he was martyred in the Cristero War, in Teocaltiche (murdered 1928)
  - John Alton, Hungarian-American cinematographer and winner of an Academy Award for An American in Paris; as Johann Altmann in Sopron, Kingdom of Hungary, Austria-Hungary (d. 1996)

== October 6, 1901 (Sunday) ==
- Tzu Hsi, the Empress Dowager of China, began her return to the national capital, departing Xi'an toward the Zhengding to Beijing railway, accompanied by a party of thousands of Imperial officers. Journalist George Ernest Morrison would note that in the journey to reach the train, "the Imperial party traveled in yellow sedan chairs, escorted by a huge bodyguard of cavalry, an enormous suite of officials, eunuchs, servants, and a baggage-train of some 3,000 gaily flagged and caparisoned carts."
- On the last day of the season for both major leagues, Cy Young won the pitching triple crown (most wins and strike outs and lowest ERA) with the Boston Americans and Nap Lajoie won the batting triple crown (most home runs, RBI's and highest batting average) playing for the Cleveland Bluebirds. This was also the first year the American League was a Major League. The National League champions were the Pittsburgh Pirates and the American League was won by the Chicago White Stockings. It would be 2 more years before the league champions faced off in the World Series.

== October 7, 1901 (Monday) ==
- The Associated Oil Company, at one time one of the three corporations that dominated the oil industry on the West Coast of the United States, was incorporated and marketed gasoline throughout its affiliated "Flying A" gas stations. It would later be merged into the Tidewater Associated Oil Company and, in 1967, be acquired by Getty Oil.
- Born:
  - Ramón Beteta Quintana, Mexican economist, deputy foreign minister during the 1930s and Finance Minister of Mexico from 1946 to 1952; in Mexico City (d. 1965)
  - Frank Boucher, Canadian National Hockey League star and Hockey Hall of Fame member who played centre (1927–1944) and was later head coach (1939–1954) for the New York Rangers; in Ottawa (d. 1977)
  - Lloyd Brown, the last surviving U.S. Navy veteran of World War I; in Lutie, Missouri (d. 2007)
  - Ralph Rainger, American film score composer; in New York City (d. 1942)
  - Prince Souvanna Phouma, Prime Minister of Laos during most of the Laotian Civil War in the 1950s and during its last 13 years (1962–1975); in Luang Prabang (d. 1984)
  - Franz Stark, American-German war criminal and captain of the SS Einsatzgruppen, described by one biographer as "one of the most loyal, blind, and stubborn followers of Nazi orders"; in St. Louis (d. 1982). Stark would avoid prosecution for nearly two decades after the German surrender, but would be one of 14 war criminals tried in Koblenz, Germany in 1962 and would be sentenced to life imprisonment on May 21, 1963.

== October 8, 1901 (Tuesday) ==
- Joachim III, the Ecumenical Patriarch of Constantinople and leader of millions of Christian adherents of the Greek Orthodox Church, issued the church's condemnation of a recently published translation of the New Testament from First Century Greek into Modern Greek. The work of Biblical scholar Alexandros Pallis was derided by Joachim III as "philological vandalism, a distortion and desecration of the sacred original"
- Donations to the worldwide fund for the ransom of Miss Ellen Stone, the American Christian missionary kidnapped in Bulgaria, surpassed $50,000 on the day of the expiration of the Bulgarian kidnappers' initial demand.
- Near the Black River in the Arizona Territory, Deputy Sheriff William Thomas Maxwell of the Apache County Sheriff's Office and Carlos Tafolla of the Arizona Rangers were killed in a shootout while tracking the Smith Gang with a posse. The shooter, who escaped to Argentina, was never caught.

== October 9, 1901 (Wednesday) ==
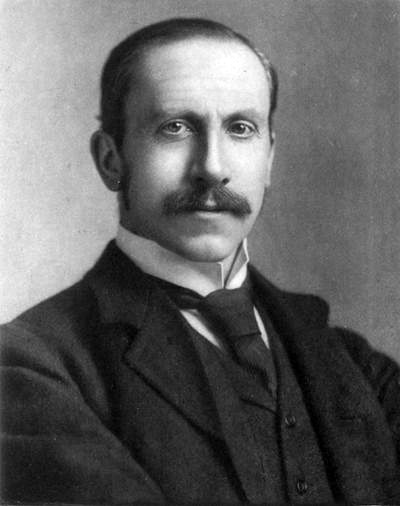
Lord Milner

- Martial law was declared by the British High Commissioner for South Africa, Lord Alfred Milner, in the Cape Colony in South Africa, suspending the constitution across the entire colony. The action followed a meeting with Milner by the Cape Colony Premier, Sir Gordon Sprigg, and Under Secretary of Native Affairs James Rose Innes.
- Voting concluded in nationwide elections for the Országgyűlés, the Parliament for the Kingdom of Hungary, allied with the Empire of Austria as part of the nation of Austria-Hungary. Hungary's Liberal Party, the Szabadelvű Párt, continued more than two-thirds majority, winning 277 of the 413 seats, and Kálmán Széll retained his position as the Kingdom's prime minister.
- Born: Alice Lee Jemison, American Indian journalist and political activist of the 1930s; in Silver Creek, New York (d. 1964)

== October 10, 1901 (Thursday) ==
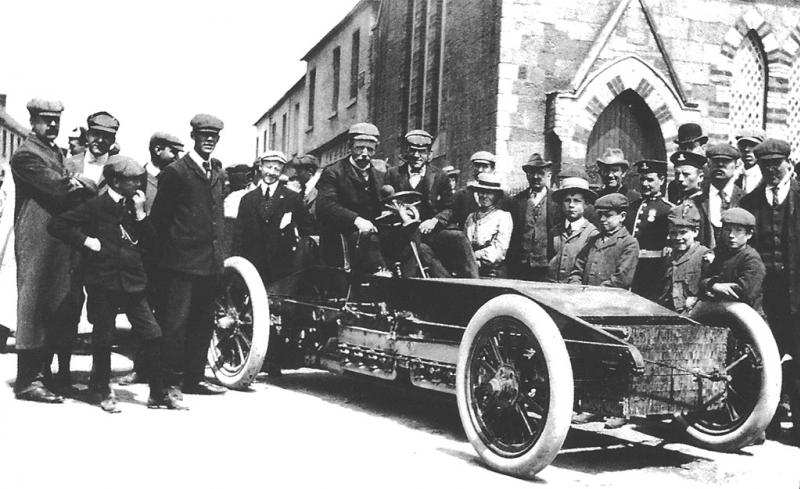
Alexander Winton

- Two automobile manufacturers, Alexander Winton of Cleveland and Henry Ford of Detroit, competed against each other at a track in Grosse Pointe, Michigan, in a race that "would set the future of American automobile and tire sales", according to one historian. The meeting at the Grosse Pointe horse racing track attracted various drivers, but Ford and Winton were the only two who felt that their cars could go the distance in the third and most important race, the $1,000 ten-lap, "ten-mile sweepstakes event". The Winton Motor Carriage Company auto was the 40-horsepower Bullet, and Winton was the most successful race car driver in America. Ford had never raced a car before, and was using the smaller, 26-horsepower Detroit Automobile Company vehicle, but he had one feature in his design, "a spark coil wrapped in a porcelain insulating case fashioned by a dentist", an early version of the spark plug. Heavily favored to win, Winton took the early lead, and was 0.2 miles (0.32 km) ahead after 3 miles (4.8 km), particularly because he was on the inside and better at rounding curves and Ford often "shut off power and ran wide on each curve". Ford, however, gradually closed the gap on the straightaways and was catching up by the sixth lap. Winton, on the other hand, began to have trouble as the ball bearings in his engine were overheating. After 7 miles (11 km), Ford passed Winton on the eighth lap, and won with an average speed of 43.5 miles per hour (70.0 km/h). The upset win not only brought Ford (who would never race again) nationwide fame, but also attracted Detroit investors who wanted to form a new corporation, which would be named the "Henry Ford Company" to capitalize on Ford's celebrity. Despite the loss to Ford, Winton won most of the headlines, because he had broken the world record for the fastest speed to drive a mile, setting a new mark of one minute, 12.4 seconds and an average speed of 49.72 miles per hour (80.02 km/h).
- Thousands of spectators in Toronto heard the song O Canada for the first time in their lives, as the band of The Royal Canadian Regiment played the music while troops marched past the visiting Duke of York. O Canada, which would become the Canadian national anthem, had been performed in Quebec since 1880, but had rarely been heard outside of the province because there was no English translation to the French words. Augustus Vogt, the conductor of the Toronto Mendelssohn Choir, was among the listeners and requested Dr. Thomas Bedford Richardson to compose an English-language version.
- Laurent Tailhade, editor of the French anarchist newspaper Libertaire, was sentenced to a year's imprisonment and fined 1,000 French francs as punishment for his "incendiary" comments made during the Russian Tsar's visit to France.
- General Redvers Buller of the British Army said in a speech that he had recommended the surrender of the fortress of Ladysmith during the Second Boer War, making remarks that would lead to his censure and removal from command.
- Born:
  - Frederick D. Patterson, African-American educator, founder of the United Negro College Fund, and president of the Tuskegee Institute from 1935 to 1953; in Washington, D.C. (d. 1988)
  - Alberto Giacometti, Swiss sculptor; in Borgonovo (d. 1966)
- Died: Lorenzo Snow, 87, president of the Church of Jesus Christ of Latter-day Saints since 1898 (b. 1814)

== October 11, 1901 (Friday) ==
- Bert Williams and George Walker "became the first African-American recording artists" when they sang together for the first of 28 phonograph records under a contract for the Victor Talking Machine Company, including two songs from their popular vaudeville show Sons of Ham— "The Phrenologist Coon" and "All Going Out and Nothing Coming In", as well as "I Don't Like That Face You Wear", "Good Morning, Carrie", "In My Castle on the River Nile", and "Where Was Moses When the Light Went Out?".
- The county seat of Baldwin County, Alabama was quietly transferred from Daphne, Alabama to Bay Minette, with the loading of courthouse records into wagons in the evening, and the driving of the wagons to the new courthouse the next day. Despite stories that courthouse records were taken in a "raid", prior arrangements were made between the two towns and the operation was carried out without incident.
- Born: Colonel Masanobu Tsuji, Imperial Japanese Army officer notable for atrocities committed during World War II, including the Bataan Death March of 1942; in Ishikawa Prefecture, Japan. Colonel Tsuji evaded prosecution for war crimes, and became a best-selling author after Allied prosecutions were dropped in 1950, but disappeared during a trip to Laos in 1961 and was declared dead in 1968.

== October 12, 1901 (Saturday) ==
- Tzu Hsi, the Empress Dowager of China, announced two edicts of reform.
- Lord Kitchener announced that Commandant Gideon Scheepers of the Boer Army had been captured by the British as a prisoner of war.
- Born: F. Edward Hébert, U.S. Congressman from Louisiana (1941–1977); in New Orleans (d. 1979)
- Died: C. S. "Buck" Fly, 52, American photographer and documentarian of the American frontier (b. 1849)

== October 13, 1901 (Sunday) ==
- Count Henri de la Vaulx of France, winner of the previous year's Gran Prix of Ballooning, departed Les Sablettes, near Toulon, on his quest to sail a balloon south across the Mediterranean Sea to French Algeria, in hopes of winning a government defense contract for his experiment in "using balloons between France, Corsica and Algeria in time of war." De La Vauix, accompanied by three other men, took along 75 homing pigeons in order to regularly send back messages about his position over the Sea, and the first one arrived in the evening, bearing a note that said that his airship had made it 50 miles (80 km) off out to sea by noon, at an altitude of 40 feet (12 m). After 42 hours, he ran into a storm and was near Port-Vendres when he signaled the French cruiser Du Chayla to bring the crew on board.
- Born:
  - Albert M. Cole, U.S. Representative for Kansas and administrator of the U.S. Housing and Home Finance Agency 1953–1959; in Moberly, Missouri (d. 1994)
  - Edith S. Sampson, American lawyer and circuit judge, who, in 1950, became the first African-American delegate to the United Nations; as Edith Spurlock in Pittsburgh (d. 1979)

== October 14, 1901 (Monday) ==
- The Discovery Expedition to Antarctica, led by Robert Falcon Scott, began the second leg of its journey as RRS Discovery departed from Cape Town, South Africa, toward New Zealand.
- Leonard Wood, the American Military Governor of Cuba, issued an order declaring that December 31, 1901, would be a legal holiday and that elections for the representatives, provincial and departmental governors, and provincial assemblies would be elected. Under the Cuban Constitution, approved by the United States, there would be no direct election of the president, vice-president or senators, but voting would be held instead for local electors to an Electoral College.
- American promoter Florenz Ziegfeld Jr. presented his first Broadway play, The Little Duchess, to showcase his common-law wife, Anna Held. The play opened at the Casino Theatre in New York City and ran for 136 performances.
- The daily newspaper, the Houston Chronicle, published its first edition.
- The town of Mackay, Idaho was incorporated.

== October 15, 1901 (Tuesday) ==
- Soprano Geraldine Farrar made her operatic debut, as Marguerite in the Berlin production of Charles Gounod's Faust.
- Nearly five years after he had served as President of the United States, Grover Cleveland came out of retirement to begin service as a member of the board of trustees of Princeton University.
- Henry Lee Higginson, one of the trustees of Harvard University, opened the Harvard Union, one of the first student unions in the United States, for the purpose of creating an inexpensive and democratic alternative to the university clubs that existed on the campus. Initially, the Harvard Union charged an annual membership fee of five dollars, which, as The New York Times would note later, "the great majority of Harvard students can easily afford." At the dedication, Higginson, who had donated the money to construct the union's building, said, "Like the Arabs, nail open your doors and offer freely to all comers the salt of hospitality."
- One of the more unusual deaths of a football player during a game happened at Fairmount Park in West Philadelphia in Pennsylvania. David Wark, aged 20, was playing a game involving "two scrub teams" when a punted football lodged in the globe of an electric streetlight. As players lowered the arm of the streetlamp, Wark grasped the wet football and was electrocuted.
- Born: Hermann Josef Abs, German banker who was on the board of directors of Deutsche Bank of other German corporations during the Nazi era, and who managed the German economic recovery after World War II, including the rebuilding of Deutsche Bank, for whom he served as chairman of the board from 1957 to 1967; in Bonn (d. 1994)
- Died: Carlos María Fitz-James Stuart, 16th Duke of Alba, 51, Spanish nobleman described as "the leader of Spanish society", suffered a fatal heart attack at his hotel in New York City, after having arrived four weeks earlier to watch the America's Cup on board Sir Thomas Lipton's yacht, the Shamrock II. The Duke, who was said to have the largest tract of private property in Spain, had finished hosting a party when he was stricken. (b. 1849)

== October 16, 1901 (Wednesday) ==
- Ten of the 46 members of Company E of the U.S. 9th Infantry Regiment were killed, and six wounded, on the Philippine island of Samar by 500 men wielding bolo knives. The Americans were better prepared than Company C had been in the September 28 attack.
- The Swedish Antarctic Expedition, led by Professor Otto Nordenskjöld of Uppsala University, departed from Gothenburg, Sweden on the ship Antarctic, captained by Carl Anton Larsen.
- Police in Italy confirmed that they had captured outlaw Giuseppe Andrea Mussolino, after two years of searching. Mussolino, suspected in at least 25 murders, was captured near Urbino by police who initially were unaware of his identity. Mussolino had escaped from prison in 1899 while serving a 21-year sentence, and then set about to get revenge on everyone who had caused his conviction, killing the trial judge, jurors and prosecution witnesses. On June 1, 1902, he would be sentenced to life imprisonment.
- French inventor Jean-Luc Krieger set a new world record for the greatest distance driven by an electric car without recharging the battery, traveling 307 kilometres (191 miles) from Paris to Châtellerault.
- U.S. President Theodore Roosevelt hosted African American leader and Tuskegee Institute President Booker T. Washington at a private dinner at the White House. "Colored men have been received at receptions and state affairs for many years," the Chicago Tribune observed the next day, "but President Roosevelt is the first to give a private invitation to a negro. Diplomatically and at all state functions no distinction is drawn as to races." Other newspaper publishers and members of Congress, particularly those from the American South, would harshly criticize Roosevelt for having a black person as the sole guest to have the honor to join him, his wife and four children for dinner in his home. Roosevelt did not invite Washington back during the remaining seven years of his term.

== October 17, 1901 (Thursday) ==
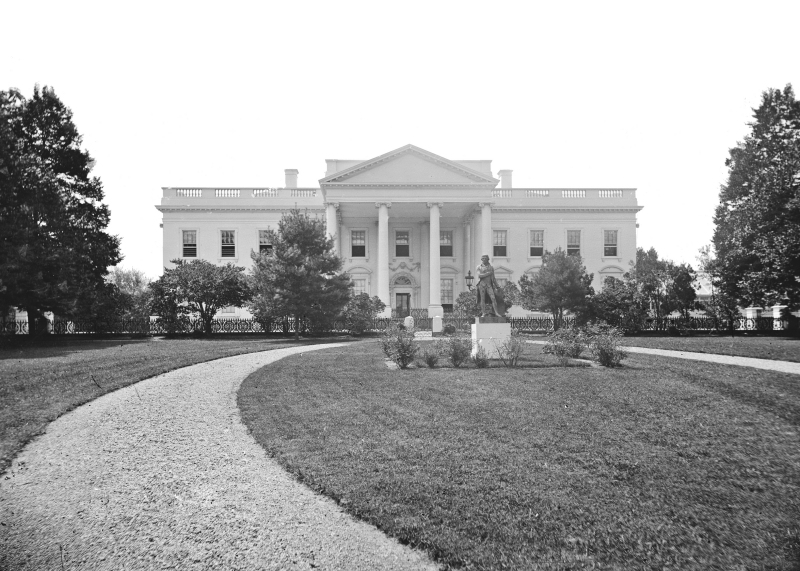
"The Executive Mansion" officially renamed

- The office of U.S. President Theodore Roosevelt confirmed that his residence would now officially be referred to as "The White House", which would be printed on all stationery and invitations in place of the previous official name "The Executive Mansion". According to the press report, Roosevelt "readily admitted that he had ordered the change" because "there were 45 executive mansions in the different states of the United States and there was but one White House."
- Joseph F. Smith was ordained as the 6th President of The Church of Jesus Christ of Latter-day Saints (LDS Church) one week after the death of President Lorenzo Snow, and would serve for 17 years until his death in 1918.
- The editor of Neues Leben, a German anarchist newspaper, was sentenced to four months imprisonment after publishing an article expressing his approval of the assassination of U.S. President William McKinley.
- Born:
  - Harry Mordecai Freedman, Russian, British, Australian and American rabbi and translator of numerous tractates of the Talmud; in Vitebsk, Russian Empire (d. 1982)
  - Lee Collins, American jazz trumpeter and bandleader; in New Orleans (d. 1960)
- Died:
  - Frances Rollin Whipper, 56, African-American activist (b. 1845)
  - George Godfrey, 48, Canadian-born black heavyweight boxer and holder of the World Colored Heavyweight Championship from 1883 to 1888, of tuberculosis (b. 1853)

== October 18, 1901 (Friday) ==
- Sir Edward Elgar's "Pomp and Circumstance March No. 1 in D" or, when its lyrics are sung, "Land of Hope and Glory", was performed for the first time in Liverpool. The march has become known at graduation ceremonies in North America simply as "Pomp and Circumstance".
- The Biblioteca Nacional José Martí, the national library for Cuba, was established by order of the U.S. occupational government in its Decree Number 234. Philanthropist Domingo Figarola Caneda, who became the library's first director, donated the nucleus of the library holdings, contributing 3,000 volumes from his private collection.
- The Russian battleship Retvizan set a new world speed record for battleships, averaging 18.8 knots over a 12-hour period.
- Died: John S. Pillsbury, 74, American businessman who co-founded the Pillsbury Company food conglomerate, served as the Governor of Minnesota from 1876 to 1882, and was known as "The Father of the University of Minnesota" for keeping the state educational institution financially solvent (b. 1827)

== October 19, 1901 (Saturday) ==
- Brazilian aviator Alberto Santos-Dumont made his third attempt to win the Deutsch Prize of 100,000 French francs, to be awarded to the first person who could successfully fly an airship from the Parc de Saint-Cloud to Paris, circle the Eiffel Tower three times, and return to his starting point within 30 minutes. Piloting his dirigible Airship No. 6, he flew the 12 mile distance to the tower in nine minutes and circled three times, then experienced engine failure on the way back. As thousands of people watched, Santos-Dumont crawled across the dirigible's keel without a safety harness, restarted the engine, and returned, then flew the rest of the way back to his starting point. Aéro-Club de France officials at first tried to deny him the award on the grounds that he had taken 30 minutes and 40 seconds to complete the trip, and after a public outcry (including from Henri Deutsch de la Meurthe himself), relented. Santos-Dumont endeared himself to the world by donating half of his prize to charity, and distributing the rest between his assistant and his crew.
- Former U.S. Army Lieutenant Colonel Alexander Oswald Brodie, who had been commanded by Colonel Theodore Roosevelt as one of the Rough Riders during the Spanish–American War, was appointed by President Roosevelt as the new Territorial Governor of Arizona.
- Born:
  - U.S. Navy Admiral Arleigh Burke, Chief of Naval Operations 1955–1961; near Boulder, Colorado (d. 1996)
  - Julius Grant, British forensic scientist; in London (d. 1991)
- Died:
  - Carl Frederik Tietgen, 72, Danish financier and industrialist who founded Denmark's telegraph company (Store Nordiske Telegraf-Selskab), the telephone company KTAB (Kjøbenhavns Telefon Aktieselskab), the food conglomerate Danisco, the Thingvalla Line and DFDS shipping companies, and the Tuborg Brewery (b. 1829)
  - U.S. Navy Rear Admiral Francis M. Bruce, 64, pioneering naval tactician

== October 20, 1901 (Sunday) ==
- Leonora Piper, who had attained international fame as a medium who could communicate with the dead through séance rituals, announced her retirement from the field in a two-and-a-half page article in the New York Herald under the headline "I Am No Telephone to the Spirit World". "I must truthfully say," she wrote to disappointed believers, "that I do not believe that spirits of the dead have spoken through me." Despite her confession, however, she quickly recanted; people continued to approach her and she would conduct séances for most of her remaining years, dying in 1950.
- Born: Adelaide Hall, American jazz singer and entertainer; in Brooklyn, New York (d. 1993)

== October 21, 1901 (Monday) ==
- The first professionally produced Irish language play, Casadh an tSúgáin ("Twisting of the Rope"), premiered at the Gaiety Theatre, Dublin, marking a milestone in the Gaelic revival movement. Douglas Hyde, who would become the first President of Ireland in 1938, wrote the one-act play, which was performed by the all-Irish Keating Branch of the Gaelic League (Craobh an Chéitinnigh na Conradh na Gaeilge).
- The English language play Diarmuid and Grania, based on an Irish legend, and co-written by George Moore and W. B. Yeats, and with music by Edward Elgar, was performed for the first time. It was the first part of the double bill at the Gaiety Theatre, and its Irish characters were portrayed by the English actors of producer Frank Benson's English Shakespearean Company.

== October 22, 1901 (Tuesday) ==
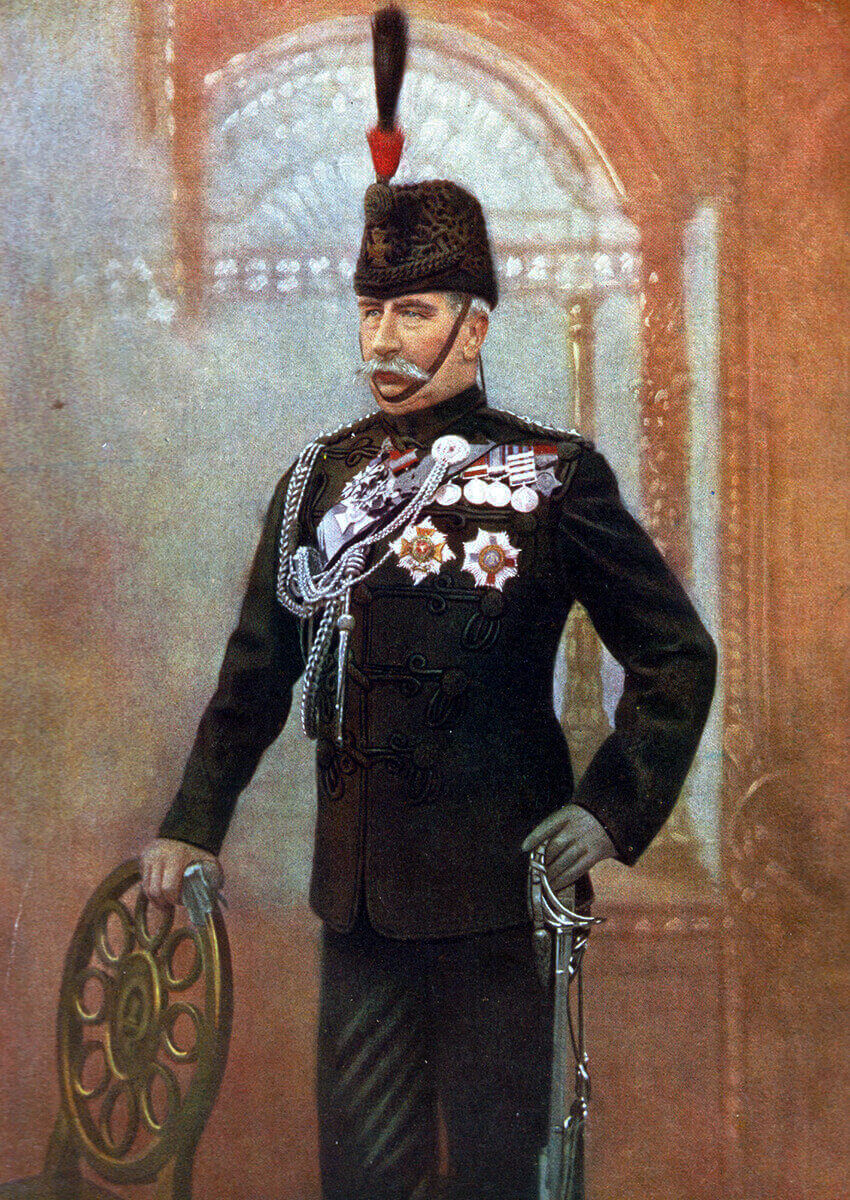
General Buller, fired

- Redvers Buller was relieved of command of the British Army's First Army Corps at Aldershot, as a consequence of his October 10 speech at Westminster, and forcibly retired on half pay. General John French was appointed to succeed Butler.
- Australian soldiers Harry "Breaker" Morant and Peter Handcock of the Bushveldt Carbineers were arrested for murdering eight Boer civilians and a German missionary and imprisoned while awaiting court martial. Both would be found guilty in 1902 and hanged.
- The Second International Conference of American States, informally known as the Pan-American Congress, opened in Mexico City with delegates from all of the nations of North, Central and South America.
- The French Chamber of Deputies failed to approve a bill that would have set a minimum wage for miners.
- The Dallas Public Library, created by the efforts of the Dallas Federation of Women's Clubs in Dallas, Texas, was inaugurated in a ceremony, with a mission of providing books to the city's white children.
- Born:
  - Ryohei Arai, Japanese film director and motion picture pioneer (d. 1980)
  - Louise "Lulu" Latsky, South African zoologist and children's author; in Carnarvon, Cape Colony (d. 1980)
- Died: Frederic Archer, 63, English-born American composer and organist (b. 1838)

== October 23, 1901 (Wednesday) ==
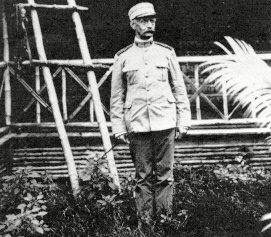
Brig. Gen. Smith

- In the Philippines, Brigadier General Jacob H. Smith directed Major Littleton Waller of the U.S. Marines to lead a battalion of 300 men to take control of Samar Island, where the American occupation continued to be resisted. According to one historian, General Smith ordered Major Waller to turn Samar into "a howling wilderness" with directions "to kill everyone over ten" years old and to take no prisoners. "I wish you to kill and burn, and the more you kill and burn the better you will please me. I want all persons killed who are capable of bearing arms in actual hostilities against the United States." Over the next three months, more than 50,000 Filipinos would be killed (the population of Samar reportedly "dropped from 312,192 to 257,125") until the surrender of resistance leader Vicente Lukban on February 22, 1902. Major Waller would deliver his first report, that he had burned 165 villages and settlements around Basey, Samar.

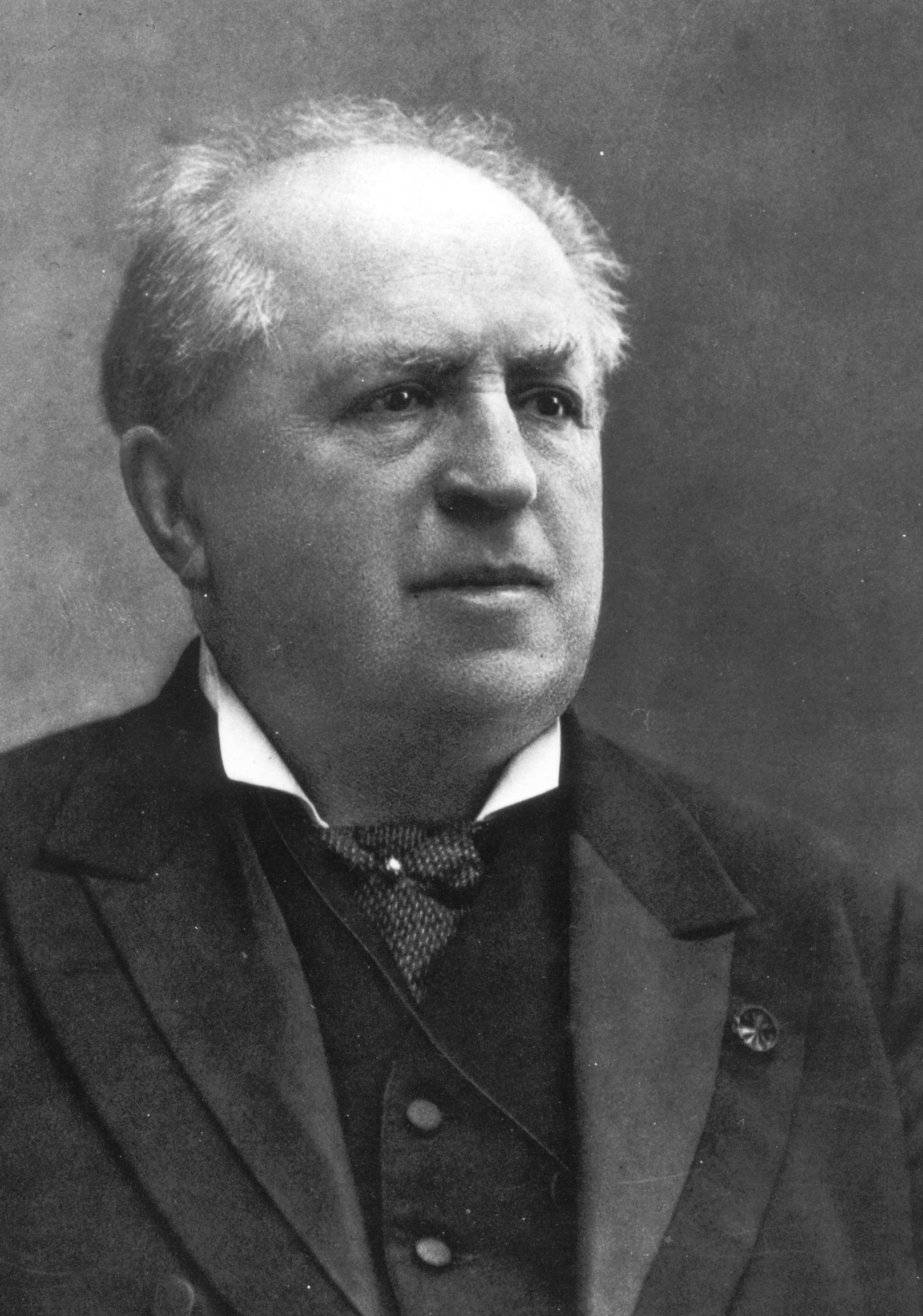
Prime Minister Kuyper

- Abraham Kuyper, who had headed the Dutch government since August, made a change in the operation of his cabinet meetings whereby, as one of his biographers would describe it, he "became the first Prime Minister of the Netherlands" Although there had been a designated "first minister" among the Council of Ministers since the office had been created in 1848, Kuyper broke the tradition of having each of the Ministers rotate the duties of chairing for the cabinet meetings. Kuyper announced that, henceforward, the person given the task of forming the government would be the chairman of the council, although the alteration of duties would not be incorporated into the constitution until 1983.
- Winston Churchill, a freshman British MP in the House of Commons, denounced the United Kingdom's involvement in the Second Boer War as "an unmitigated nuisance and a blunder" in a speech on the floor of Parliament.
- Yale University celebrated the bicentennial of its founding, and conferred an honorary doctorate of law on U.S. President Theodore Roosevelt, and degrees to 64 other American and foreign dignitaries, including authors Mark Twain, Nathaniel Hawthorne, Thomas Nelson Page, poet Richard Watson Gilder, and political scientist (and future president) Woodrow Wilson. Also honored were the Marquis Ito former Prime Minister of Japan; aviation pioneer Samuel Langley; United States Secretary of State John Hay; and U.S. Supreme Court Chief Justice Melville Fuller.
- Died:
  - Friedrich Preller, 63, German artist (b. 1838)
  - Georg von Siemens, 62, German banker and co-founder of Deutsche Bank (b. 1839)

== October 24, 1901 (Thursday) ==
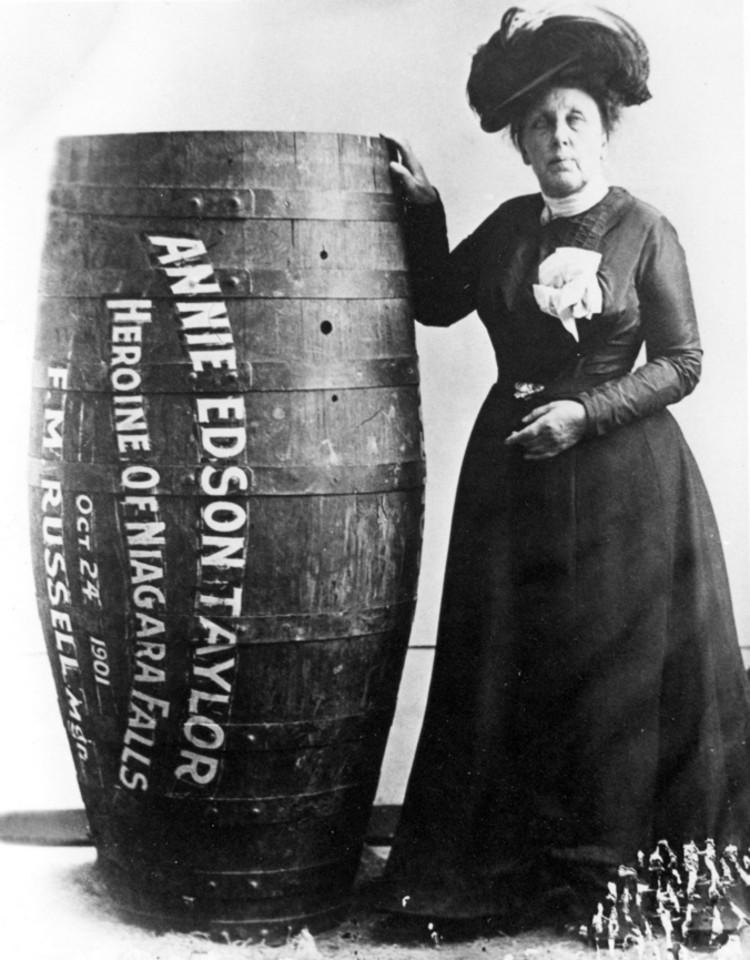
First to survive the plunge

- Annie Edson Taylor, a 63-year old schoolteacher from Bay City, Michigan, became the first person to plunge over Niagara Falls in a barrel and to survive. At 4:05 in the afternoon, the barrel and Mrs. Taylor were released into the currents of the Niagara River after being towed by a boat from Grand Island. Eighteen minutes later, at 4:23 "the barrel made its plunge over the crest of the horseshoe" (Horseshoe Falls) as thousands of spectators watched, and was out of sight for a minute before it was seen floating in the rapids. Taylor was towed to shore 17 minutes after the plunge, climbed out, and waved to the crowd. After she emerged from the barrel to talk to the press, she said, "After the men set me adrift, I closed my eyes and prayed... I knew when I went over the fall and I lost my senses just a minute." She added, "I would warn anybody not to do it.... I would rather face a cannon, knowing that I would be blown to pieces, than go over the falls again."
- The British Psychological Society was founded by ten professionals who gathered at University College London, including W. R. Boyce Gibson, William McDougall, W. H. R. Rivers, James Sully, Robert Armstrong-Jones, Frederick Mott and Sophie Bryant.
- Sociology Professor H. H. Powers of Cornell University shocked a group of students by advocating the euthanasia of intellectually disabled Americans. "I am strongly in favor of killing off the weak in society for the benefit of the strong," he said. "Kill off the feeble-minded and those who are a burden to the rest of society as you would kill off so many rattlesnakes, not because we hate them but because they are troublesome to have around. I believe the time will come when society will see the benefit of exterminating the weak by artificial means."
- Born:
  - Gilda Gray, Polish-American dancer and actress who popularized the "shimmy"; in Kraków, Austria-Hungary (now Poland) (d. 1959)
  - Hjalmar Mäe, Estonian politician who served as director-general of Nazi Germany's puppet government of occupied Estonia, the Estonian Self-Administration; in Tuhala (d. 1978)
  - Moultrie Kelsall, Scottish film and television actor; in Bearsden, East Dunbartonshire (d. 1980)
  - Gerald Fitzmaurice, British judge and legal scholar who served on the International Court of Justice and the Permanent Court of Arbitration (d. 1982)
  - Harry Breuer, American musician known for his compositions for the xylophone; in Brooklyn (d. 1989)
  - Fritz Eichenberg, German-American illustrator; in Cologne (d. 1990)
- Died:
  - James McDougal Hart, 73, American landscape painter (b. 1828)
  - Prince Joachim Napoleon Murat, 67, American-French general (b. 1834)

== October 25, 1901 (Friday) ==
- The ship Helen Miller Gould, described as "the first engine-powered schooner", was destroyed only 19 months after its launch when its gasoline engine caught fire at North Sydney, Nova Scotia and burned all the way down to the waterline.
- Nineteen people were killed in a fast-moving fire in the business district on Market Street in downtown Philadelphia, and another 12 seriously burned. The blaze broke out in an eight-story building occupied by the Hunt & Wilkinson furniture and upholstery store, then spread to three neighboring buildings. Many of the victims jumped to their deaths when flames burst out on the fire escape below them. The flames apparently started in the basement at the bottom of a newly installed freight elevator shaft and spread rapidly up the rest of the structure.
- The Amalgamated Copper Mining Company fired 8,000 employees in a single day as it curtailed production of mining operations.

== October 26, 1901 (Saturday) ==
- Russia announced that it had reached an agreement with China on concessions in Manchuria.
- Della Moore, one of the partners in crime of Butch Cassidy's Wild Bunch and girlfriend of gang member Harvey "Kid Curry" Logan, was arrested in Nashville, Tennessee, after she attempted to deposit thousands of dollars in cash at the Fourth National Bank of Nashville. The teller, suspicious about the stack of currency, consulted a list of serial numbers of stolen bills and confirmed that the money was part of the $41,000 taken in a train robbery near Wagner, Montana on July 3 and called the city police and Moore, alias "Annie Rogers", was charged with receiving stolen property. She would be acquitted after a trial on June 18, 1902.
- The death of a five-year-old girl at City Hospital in St. Louis, the first of 13 from a contaminated antitoxin distributed by that city's health department, would lead to the United States Congress finally passing the first federal law to regulate medicines, and paved the way for the Pure Food and Drug Act of 1906. Specifically, the young victims had been given shots to treat diphtheria, but the tainted serum had given them tetanus and the new law, which would take effect on July 1, 1902, authorized the United States Public Health Service to inspect producers and test their medicines, as well as to require the first expiration dates to be placed on a health product.

== October 27, 1901 (Sunday) ==
- Russia and Iran signed a commercial treaty reducing the tariff on the import of goods imported primarily from Russia (sugar and gasoline) and raising the tariffs on those from the United Kingdom (piece good fabrics) and British India (tea). The secret agreement would not be revealed until shortly before its effective date of February 14, 1903.
- Born:
  - Emil M. Mrak, pioneering American food technologist; in San Francisco (d. 1987) Two species of yeast would be named in his honor, Williopsis mrakki and Zygosaccharomyces mrakki.
  - Lucio Piccolo, Italian poet; in Palermo (d. 1969)
  - Herndon Davis, American painter of the American West and muralist; in Wynnewood, Oklahoma (d. 1962)

== October 28, 1901 (Monday) ==
- The United States Court of Claims ruled that the states of Maine, New Hampshire, Pennsylvania and Rhode Island were entitled to be reimbursed by the U.S. Treasury for interest and expenses that had been made 50 years earlier to the federal government for troop equipment during the American Civil War.
- The largest and fastest cruiser in the world, HMS King Alfred, was launched by the Royal Navy from the shipyard at Barrow, England.
- Mississippi State University, then known as Mississippi A & M, won its first college football game and began a rivalry with the University of Mississippi, defeating "Ole Miss" 17–0. Since 1928, the annual football game of the two teams has been for a trophy known as the "Egg Bowl".
- Born: Hilo Hattie, native Hawaiian singer and actress, as Clarissa Haili; in Honolulu (d. 1979)
- Died: Paul Rée, 52, German author, philosopher and confidant of Friedrich Nietzsche, was killed while hiking in the Swiss Alps near Celerina, Switzerland when he slipped on ice and fell into the Charnadüra gorge (b. 1849)

== October 29, 1901 (Tuesday) ==
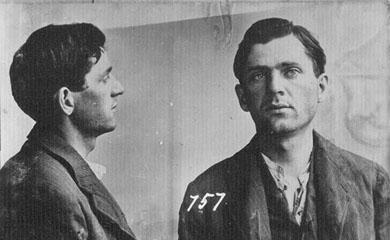
Czolgosz executed

- Convicted presidential assassin Leon Czolgosz was strapped into the electric chair at the Auburn State Prison in Auburn, New York, at 7:00 in the morning, wearing "a neatly pressed suit, soft collar and black tie" as well as dress shoes that he had polished "to a high gloss". Asked if he had any last words to say in the presence of witnesses, Czolgosz said, "I am not sorry for my crime," and then added, "I am awfully sorry that I could not see my father." According to one source, before the electric current was activated, Czolgosz said, "I shot the President and I did it because I thought it would benefit the poor people and for the name of the working people of all nations. I am not sorry for my crime. That is all I have to say. A current of 1,700 volts was administered at 7:12, and Czolgosz was pronounced dead at 7:15.
- In Amherst, New Hampshire, nurse Jane Toppan was arrested for murdering the Davis family of Boston with overdoses of morphine.
- The train conveying the performers of Buffalo Bill's Wild West show was wrecked near Lexington, Virginia, while conveying the troupe from Charlotte, North Carolina to Danville, Virginia, for its last scheduled performance of the season. Several of the Lakota Indian performers were killed, as well as 110 horses, and Annie Oakley was seriously injured, putting an end to her career as a talented sharpshooter. Oakley, whose story would be dramatized in the musical Annie Get Your Gun, would undergo five separate operations for her spinal injuries.
- Died: James McGarry, Irish-American saloon operator who was the inspiration for Finley Peter Dunne's character "Mr. Dooley" in Dunne's humorous newspaper column, "The Dooley Papers".

== October 30, 1901 (Wednesday) ==
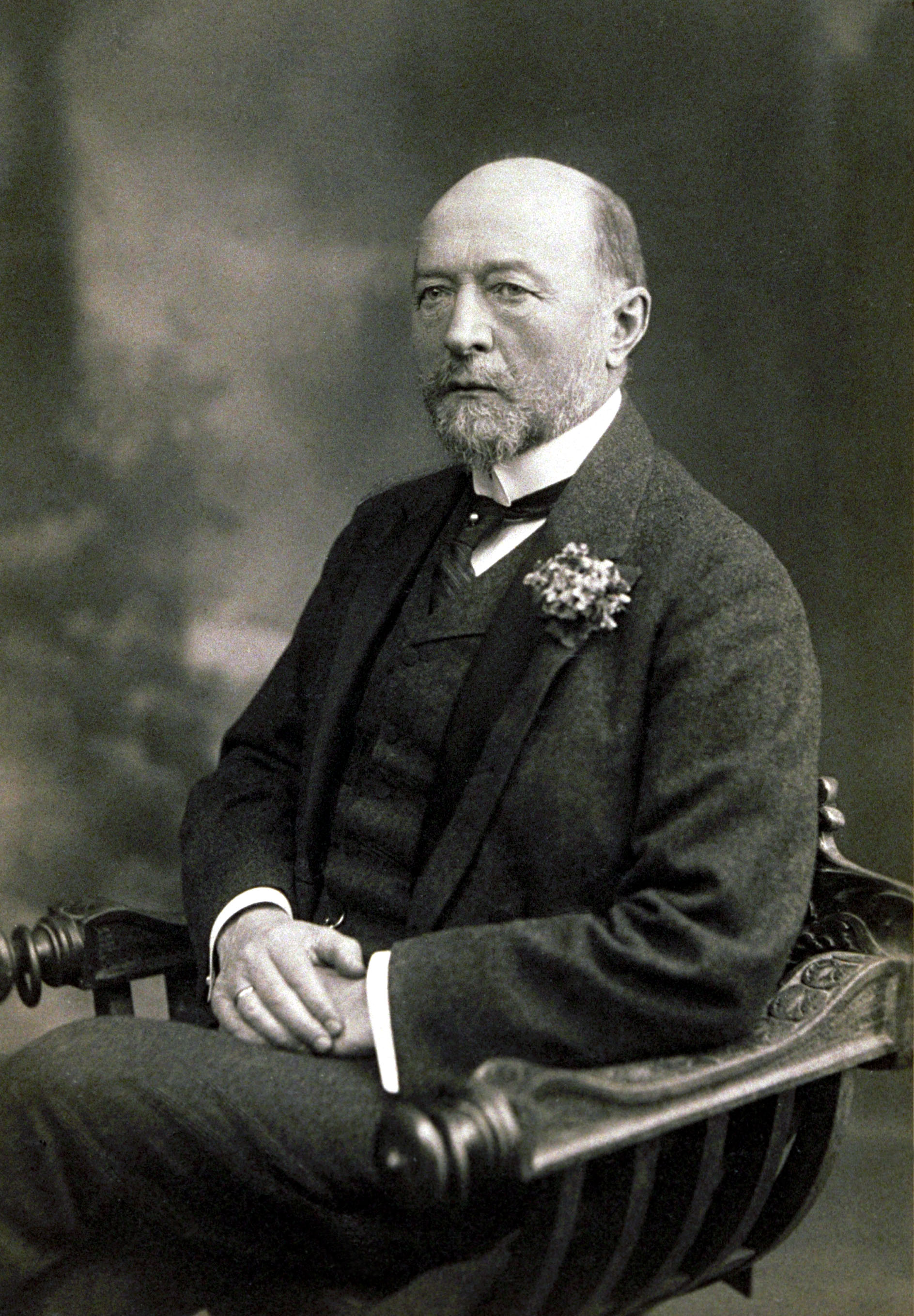
First Nobel Prize winner

- Dr. Emil von Behring was selected to become the very first recipient of the new Nobel Prize in Physiology or Medicine, as voted by the Nobel Committee members at Sweden's foremost college of medicine, the Karolinska Institute. Dr. Behring had discovered the antitoxin to cure the disease of diphtheria, and then applied the same principles of blood serum isolation to create a cure for tetanus.
- In the Battle of Bakenlaagte, Eastern Transvaal Boer Commandos, led by General Louis Botha, overwhelmed the British Army No. 3 Flying Column, led by Lieutenant Colonel George Elliot Benson. Under Benson's leadership, the No. 3 column had specialized in night raids against the commandos. In a rearguard attack, 66 of the British Army were killed (including Lt. Col. Benson), 165 wounded, and 120 taken prisoner. One of the newer techniques employed by the Boers was to ride horses toward the enemy, then "dismounting at close rifle range" to spring the attack.

== October 31, 1901 (Thursday) ==
- City leaders in Liverpool announced that the port had become infected with the bubonic plague.
- Died:
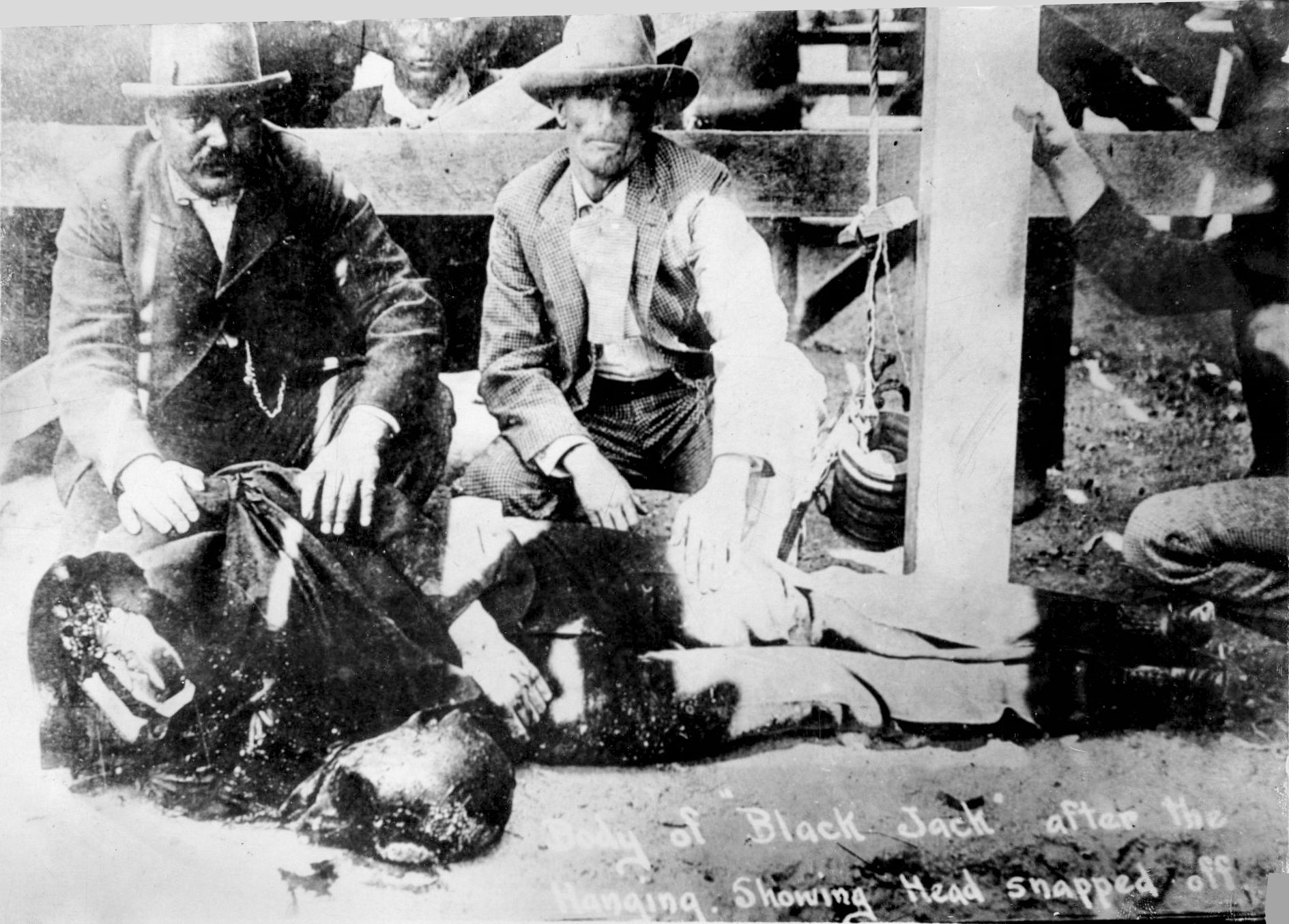
  Photo from a contemporary postcard showing Tom Ketchum's decapitated body. Caption reads "Body of Black Jack after the hanging showing head snapped off."
  - Elizabeth Hanbury, 108, British philanthropist and abolitionist who was the oldest person in Britain at the time of her death, and one of only a few people to live in the 18th, 19th and 20th century.(b. 1793)
  - Thomas "Black Jack" Ketchum, 37, train robber and member of the Hole-in-the-Wall Gang, was decapitated while being hung because the rope was too long.
