= November 1901 =

Month in 1901

<<	November 1901					>>
Su	Mo	Tu	We	Th	Fr	Sa
					1	2
3	4	5	6	7	8	9
10	11	12	13	14	15	16
17	18	19	20	21	22	23
24	25	26	27	28	29	30

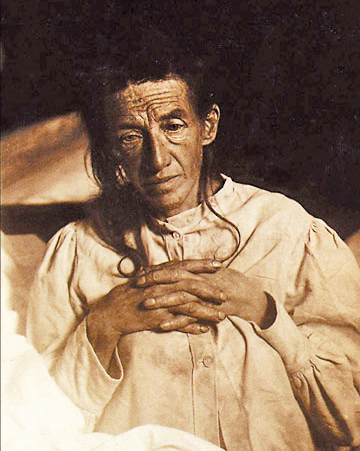
November 26, 1901: "Auguste D.", dementia patient...

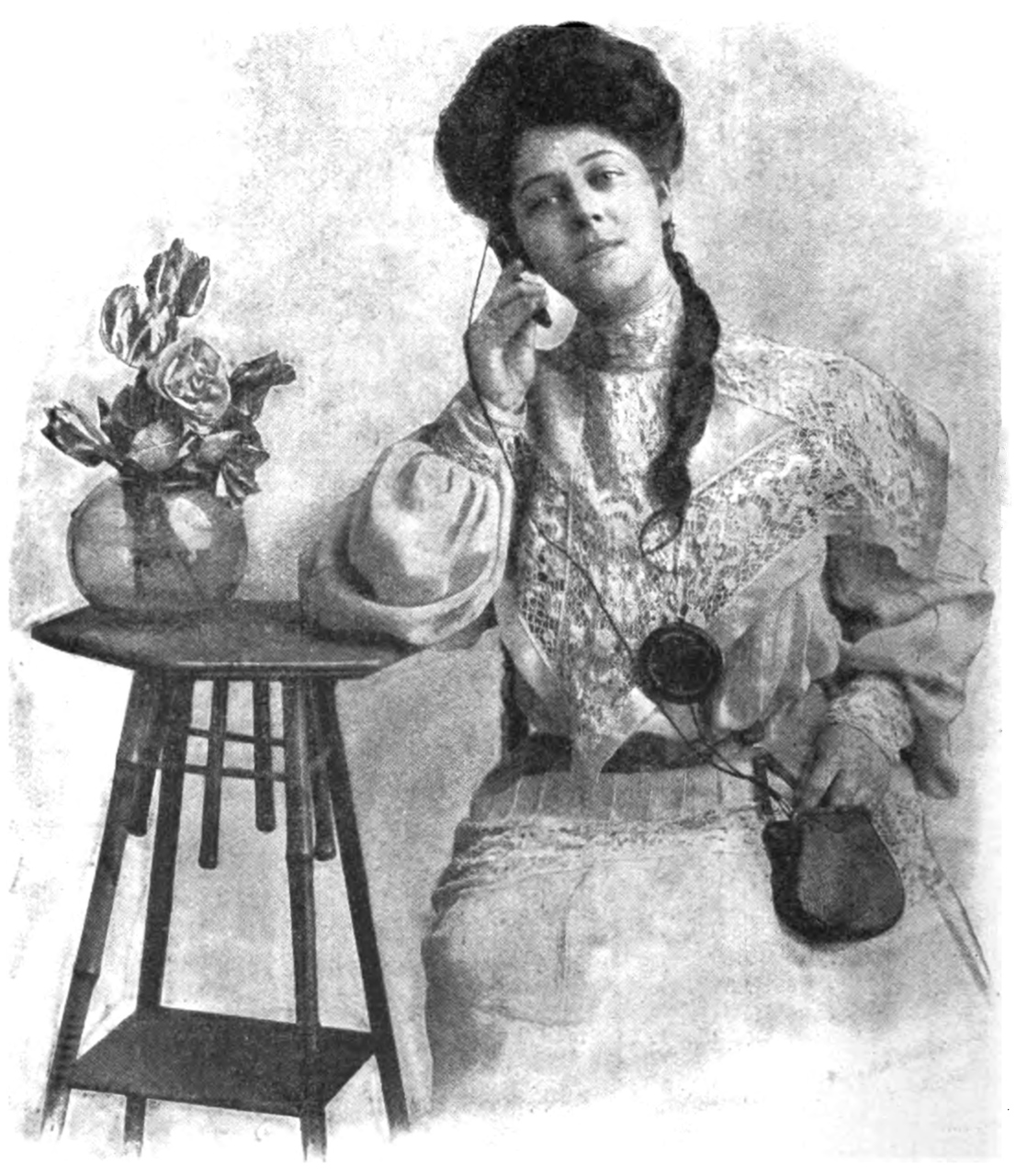
November 15, 1901: The Acousticon, first battery-powered hearing aid, is patented

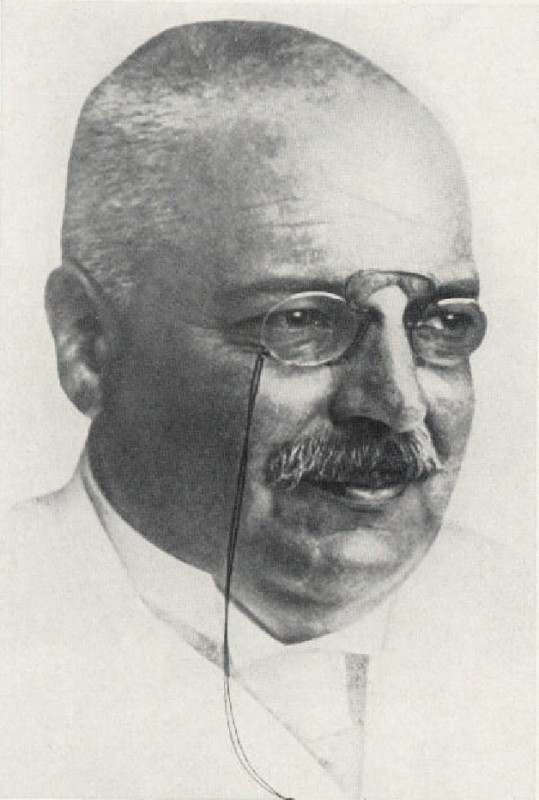
... becomes textbook case for Dr. Alois Alzheimer

The following events occurred in November 1901:

== November 1, 1901 (Friday) ==
- Prince George, heir apparent to the British throne (and future King George V), the Duke of Cornwall and York, returned to the United Kingdom with his wife, disembarking at Portsmouth after a worldwide tour of the British Empire.
- The Sigma Phi Epsilon fraternity was founded, in Richmond, Virginia.

== November 2, 1901 (Saturday) ==
- The Pan-American Exposition, marred by the assassination of U.S. President William McKinley and inadequate revenues, closed in Buffalo, New York. "At midnight," the press reported, "President John G. Milburn pressed an electric button and the lights in the famous electric tower grew dim for the last time. Slowly one by one, the lights on the post and pinnace and tower faded away. A corps of buglers standing in the tower sounded 'taps' and one of the greatest glories of the exposition, the electric illumination, passed and away and the exposition was ended." During its six-month run, the Exposition's losses were estimated at three million dollars.
- An assassin attempted to kill China's Dowager Empress, Tzu Hsi, as she and her entourage were making their journey through the Henan Province back to Beijing. One of the Empress's attendants killed the attacker with a spear, and the party continued onward the next day.
- The town of Elk Horn, Iowa, home of the Museum of Danish America and a center of American settlers from Denmark, was founded.
- Born: Magda Trocmé, Italian-born French humanitarian who, along with her husband Pastor André Trocmé, saved 3,500 Jewish refugees in Nazi-occupied France during World War II and one of the designated Righteous Among the Nations; in Firenze, as Magda Grilli di Cortona (d. 1971)

== November 3, 1901 (Sunday) ==
- Motorcycle racing was introduced in Japan, with an event on an oval track at Ueno Park.
- The Columbus Panhandles professional football team, which would later be one of the founding members of the National Football League, played its first recorded game, losing to the Columbus Barracks, a team of local soldiers. The Panhandles lost, 6–2.
- Born:
- Leopold III of Belgium, son of King Albert and Queen Elisabeth of Belgium; in Brussels (d. 1983)
- André Malraux, French novelist and France's first Minister of Culture; in Créteil, Val-de-Marne département (d. 1976)
- Lionel Hitchman, Canadian ice hockey star; in Toronto (d. 1969)
- Akimoto Fujio, Japanese haiku poet, in Yokohama (d. 1977)

== November 4, 1901 (Monday) ==
- The Philippine Commission, composed of five American officials and three Filipino members who served as the lawmaking body of the American occupied Philippine Islands, passed the Philippine Sedition Act, making it a crime to "utter seditious words or speeches, write, publish or circulate scurrilous libels" against the occupation government or the United States government. American author Mark Twain was one of the critics of the strict law, and wrote, "What is treason in one part of our States... is doubtless law everywhere under the flag," and added, "On these terms, I would rather be a traitor than an archangel."
- The Wandervogel, described by one historian as "the first independent youth movement", was founded in Germany by Karl Fischer and nine other young men, at a meeting in the basement of the Town Hall in Steglitz, a suburb of Berlin. The full name of the association was Wandervogel, Ausschuß für Schülerfahrten (Association for Student Excursions); the word Wandervogel itself literally means "wandering birds".
- The committee of the Aéro-Club de France, faced with a public outcry for denying the Deutsch Prize to Alberto Santos-Dumont, voted 12 to 9 to award him the prize of 100,000 francs for navigating an airship from Longchamps to the Eiffel Tower and back within 30 minutes. In October, Santos-Dumont had been denied the prize because he had arrived 30 minutes and 40 seconds after he departed.
- France's Chamber of Deputies voted, 305–77, to authorize the nation's navy to take action in pressing demands against the Ottoman Empire.
- King Edward of the United Kingdom was given a new title, Edward VII. Dei Gratia Britannorum et Terrarum Transarinarum Quae in Dicione Sunt Britannica Rex. Fidel Defensor. Indiae Imperator ("Edward the Seventh, by the grace of God, of the United Kingdom of Great Britain and Ireland and of the British dominions beyond the sea, King, defender of the faith, and Emperor of India").
- Born:
  - Max Wagner, Mexican-American film actor, in Torreón, state of Coahuila (d. 1975)
  - Yi Bangja, the wife of former Crown Prince Uimin of Korea, pretender to the Korean throne; as Japanese Princess Masako Nashimoto, in Tokyo (d. 1989)

== November 5, 1901 (Tuesday) ==
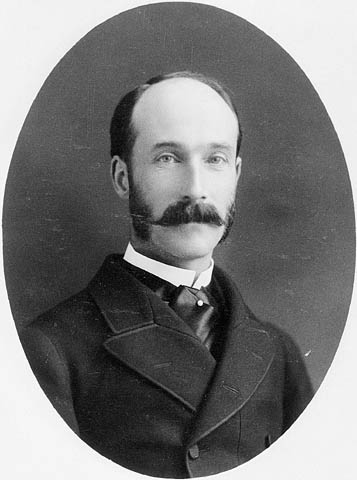
British Foreign Secretary Lansdowne

- The British Cabinet voted in favor of the proposal by the Foreign Secretary, Lord Lansdowne, for an alliance between the United Kingdom and Japan.
- Poland's National Philharmonic Orchestra performed its first concert, with a program of music by Polish composers.
- Seth Low, the President of Columbia University was elected as the second Mayor of New York City as a reform candidate, defeating Mayor Robert Van Wyck, who had been the first executive of the consolidated boroughs in 1898. With the defeat of Van Wyck, Democratic party boss Richard Croker announced his resignation as the leader of Tammany Hall control of city politics.
- Importing an event that was popular in Europe, the Automobile Club of New Jersey conducted the first automotive hill climb in the United States. The Eagle Rock Hill Climb took place in West Orange, New Jersey, with a race up the steep Eagle Rock Avenue.
- Nikola Tesla was granted U.S. Patent No. 685,957 for his invention, "Apparatus for the Utilization of Radiant Energy", which he described as a machine that could convert the sun's energy and turn it into electricity.
- The French Navy's Mediterranean Fleet seized three ports on the Turkish island of Midilli (now the Greek island of Lesbos), to be held until the government of the Ottoman Empire satisfied French debts.
- Police in St. Louis arrested American outlaw Ben Kilpatrick, a member of Butch Cassidy's Wild Bunch gang, for passing stolen bank notes. Because Kilpatrick initially refused to identify himself, the police thought at first that they had captured Harry Longabaugh, alias of the Sundance Kid.
- Voters in Berwyn and Oak Park, now both suburbs of Chicago, voted to separate from Cicero Township and to become independent cities. The vote in Berwyn was 1,237 to 298 in favor of separation, and was 1,357 to 250 in Oak Park.
- Born:
  - Etta Moten Barnett, African-American contralto vocalist known for her portrayal of Bess in Porgy and Bess; in Weimar, Texas (d. 2004)
  - Victor C. Twitty, American embryologist and biologist; near Loogootee, Indiana (d. 1967)

== November 6, 1901 (Wednesday) ==
- The United Kingdom and Brazil signed a treaty agreeing to arbitration to establish the boundary between northern Brazil and British Guiana (now Guyana). The King of Italy, Victor Emmanuel III, would render his decision on June 6, 1904, and, after agreeing to correct inaccuracies in the award, the nations would sign a treaty on April 22, 1926, to set the boundary along Essequibo River and the Courantyne River.
- At the Pan-American Conference, Guatemala introduced its draft plan for an international Court of Claims for the nations of the Western Hemisphere.
- The municipality of Norris City, Illinois, was incorporated.
- Born:
  - Richard Aaron, Welsh philosopher; in Seven Sisters (Blaendulais), West Glamorgan, Wales (d. 1987)
  - Juanita Hall, American stage and film actress known for her Tony Award-winning performance in South Pacific; in Keyport, New Jersey (d. 1968)
- Died: Kate Greenaway, 55, English illustrator of children's books, died of breast cancer (b. 1846)

== November 7, 1901 (Thursday) ==
- Twenty-six federal inmates, who had been working on construction of the new prison at Leavenworth, Kansas, overpowered their guards and escaped. Correctional Officer Joseph B. Waldrupe of the Federal Bureau of Prisons was shot and mortally wounded during the escape. He would die of his injuries on November 16.
- Mexico introduced a proposed arbitration treaty at the Pan-American Conference, modeled after the Hague Treaty signed by European states.
- Born: Norah McGuinness, Irish painter and illustrator; in County Londonderry (d. 1980)
- Died: Li Hongzhang, 78, Chinese general (b. 1823)

== November 8, 1901 (Friday) ==
- The Ottoman Empire government yielded on French demands, prompting the French Navy to withdraw from blockading Turkish ports.
- Born:
  - Gheorghe Gheorghiu-Dej, General Secretary of the Romanian Communist Party (1955–1965), President of Romania (1961–1965), and Prime Minister (1952–1955); in Bârlad (d. 1965)
  - Field Marshal Xu Xiangqian, Chinese military leader, Chief of Staff of the People's Liberation Army who served as Minister of National Defense of China (1978–1981); in Wutai, Shanxi Province (d. 1990)
  - Mark Oliphant, Australian nuclear physicist who later served as Governor of South Australia (1971–1976), in Kent Town, South Australia (d. 2000)
  - Albert Streckeisen, Swiss-born Romanian geologist; in Basel (d. 1998)
- Died:
  - Mary Ann Bickerdyke, 84, American nurse, veterans advocate and humanitarian who established hundreds of field hospitals for Union Army soldiers during the American Civil War (b. 1817)

== November 9, 1901 (Saturday) ==
- Prince George, Duke of York, son of King Edward and heir apparent to the British throne, was named Prince of Wales and received the additional designation of Earl of Chester. He would become King George V on May 6, 1910, upon the death of his father.
- A division of French Army troops was killed in Africa while attempting to attack the Senussi village of Bir 'Alali in what is now the Republic of Chad. The French would return in greater force and capture the area on January 20, 1902.
- The Glasgow Exhibition closed in Scotland.
- Sergei Rachmaninoff's Piano Concerto No. 2 in C minor, Op. 18 was performed for the first time, played by him in Moscow, and "fully restored his belief in himself" after a five-year absence from classical music that had followed the poor reception given to his First Symphony in 1897.
- Thomas Edison completed a newsreel showing a re-enactment of the execution of presidential assassin Leon Czolgosz in the electric chair at Auburn State Prison in October, after being denied a request to film the actual event. Edwin S. Porter and George S. Fleming had taken a movie of the outside of the prison, then recreated the scene using actors posing as prison guards and technicians, and one portraying Czolgosz himself. "As depicted by Edison's men," an author would later note, "the apparent painlessness of Czolgosz's death promoted the belief that electrocution was indeed a kindly method of dispatch," and cinema audiences enjoyed the recreated death scene.

== November 10, 1901 (Sunday) ==
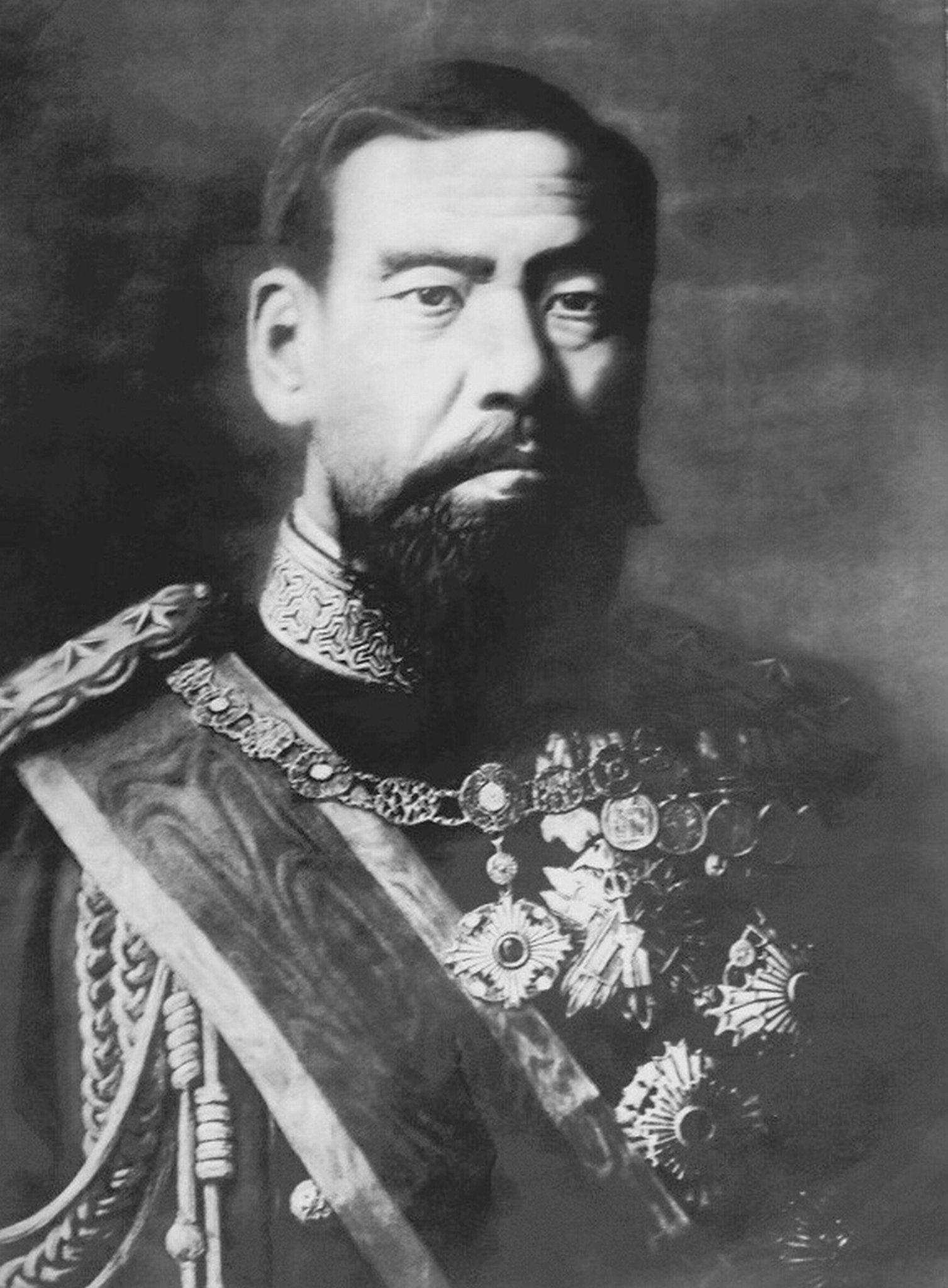
Japan's Emperor Meiji

- The train on which Japan's Emperor Meiji was riding was almost involved in a collision with another train that stalled on the same track, when the Traffic Section Chief at the Semine Station allowed the Imperial Train to depart. The near miss involving the Imperial Train would be used by the Nippon Railway Company as the basis for the dissolution of the recently formed labor union of engine drivers, the Kyoseikai.
- The Gulf Refining Company, forerunner of the major oil conglomerate Gulf Oil, was chartered in Texas.
- On his way home after a Saturday night state dinner on the occasion of King Edward's birthday, Ottawa Mayor W. D. Morris committed a minor criminal offense that would lead to his resignation only a week later. Morris, who had been inaugurated as the Canadian capital's mayor at the beginning of the year, was with two friends and the group stopped by the Russell House hotel for drinks. When he bought more drinks for himself and his friends after the bar closed at midnight, he was charged by the Ottawa Chief of Police with violating the provincial law against "buying liquor during prohibited hours". Under Ontario's municipalities law at the time, a violator of provincial acts was disqualified from voting or holding public office for a period of two years, and Mayor Morris pled guilty on November 16, then resigned.
- Seven men aboard the British battleship HMS Royal Sovereign were killed, and 14 injured, including Commander Robert Keith Arbuthnot, when a 12-inch gun exploded while being fired during maneuvers in the Aegean Sea. As Rear Admiral of the Royal Navy, Arbuthnot would die along with 900 members of his crew in the sinking of HMS Defence during the Battle of Jutland during World War I.

== November 11, 1901 (Monday) ==
- Voters in Alabama approved a new state constitution that disenfranchised African Americans (taking away their right to vote), favoring it by a margin of 108,613 to 81,734. Many of the votes in favor had come from African Americans who were unaware of the provisions that would ultimately remove their power to cast ballots. During the years from 1901 to 1908, the number of registered African American voters in Alabama would decline from 79,000 to fewer than 4,000, and the Alabama model would be followed by other states in the Deep South.
- Ioseb "Koba" Jughashvili, who would become the absolute ruler of the Soviet Union as Joseph Stalin, went on trial before his fellow Marxists of the Tiflis (now Tbilisi) branch of the Russian Social Democratic Labour Party, to investigate slander against party leaders. The local Party committee voted unanimously to expel him from membership, describing him to be "a slanderer and an intriguer", and he left the Georgian capital to move to Batumi, Georgia.
- After his New York Journal morning newspaper suffered a decline of readership because of its continued criticism of President William McKinley prior to his assassination, publisher William Randolph Hearst rebranded the daily as the New York Journal and American, as a prelude to selling it as the New York American in 1902.
- France and the Ottoman Empire resumed diplomatic relations.
- Born:
  - Sam Spiegel, Austrian-American film producer, three-time Academy Award winner (for On the Waterfront, The Bridge on the River Kwai, and Lawrence of Arabia); in Jaroslau, Austria-Hungary (now Jarosław, Poland) (d. 1985)
  - Dorothy Whitelock, English historian and specialist on the medieval history of Great Britain; in Leeds, Yorkshire (d. 1982)
  - Magda Goebbels, German wife of Propaganda Minister Joseph Goebbels; as Johanna Magdalena Ritschel in Berlin. She and her husband poisoned their six children before committing suicide on May 1, 1945.

== November 12, 1901 (Tuesday) ==
- The Northern Securities Company was chartered, with starting capital of $400,000,000, to serve as a holding company for James J. Hill's 76% share of Northern Pacific Railway and 96% share of Great Northern Railway, along with E. H. Harriman's interests in Union Pacific Railroad and Southern Pacific Railroad, and J. P. Morgan's share of Chicago, Burlington and Quincy Railroad, with Hill serving as Northern Securities' President. The combine, which controlled rail travel in almost all of the states west of the Mississippi River, would eventually be broken up by an antitrust lawsuit filed by the U.S. Department of Justice, which would be finally resolved by the U.S. Supreme Court on March 14, 1904, in the landmark decision of Northern Securities Co. v. United States.
- The most powerful recorded storm in British history, up to that time, struck southern Ireland, Wales, the Midlands, Lincolnshire and into the English Channel, killing more than 200 people over 48 hours. Winds averaging nearly 70 miles an hour, with gusts up to 100 mph, sank ships in the Channel and at the Southwest Approaches. Among the ships that went down were the revenue cutter Active, with the captain and 19 of its crew of 24 being drowned at the Granton breakwater; an unidentified French ship with 19 aboard wrecked at Sunderland; seven people on the Swedish barque Trio; and 16 crewmen on the Norwegian barque Inga.
- The United States government warned the government of Bulgaria not to interfere with American negotiations to free hostage Ellen Stone, and the Bulgarian government would be held responsible if she were killed.
- Born: James Luther Adams, American Unitarian theologian and philosopher; in Ritzville, Washington (d. 1994)
- Died: Sister Julia McGroarty, 74, founder of the prestigious all-female Trinity College (now Trinity Washington University).

== November 13, 1901 (Wednesday) ==
- In one of the more prominent disasters from the Great Storm that struck the British Isles, the rescue boat Beauchamp was capsized along with its crew after setting off from Caister-on-Sea in an attempt to save a vessel sinking in the North Sea. Only three of the 14 rescuers on board, who had continued to row into the storm despite the heavy surf, survived.
- Born:
  - Arturo Jauretche, Argentine writer, politician, and philosopher; in Lincoln, Argentina (d. 1974)
  - Heinrich Hertel, German aeronautical engineer; in Düsseldorf (d. 1982)
  - Werner Bachmann, American chemist; in Detroit (d. 1951)

== November 14, 1901 (Thursday) ==
- In a letter to explorer Fridtjof Nansen, Swedish oceanographer Vagn Walfrid Ekman first demonstrated the mathematical explanation of what is now referred to as the Ekman spiral to predict the direction of ocean flow based on wind conditions, prevailing currents, and the Coriolis force produced by the steady rotation of the Earth.
- Roughly 200 square miles of the Arizona Territory was added to the existing Navajo Indian Reservation by executive order of U.S. President Theodore Roosevelt. The addition, which includes the town of Leupp, Arizona (named for Bureau of Indian Affairs official, and later Commissioner, Francis E. Leupp, and referred to in the Navajo language as Tsiizizii) is referred to as the "Leupp Extension".
- Born: Morton Downey, American popular singer nicknamed "The Irish Nightingale"; in Wallingford, Connecticut (d. 1985)
- Died: James Henry Mapleson, 71, English opera impresario and producer (b. 1830)

== November 15, 1901 (Friday) ==
- Inventor Miller Reese Hutchison of New York City applied for two patents for the components of what would become the first battery-powered hearing aid, which he marketed under the brand name "Acousticon". U.S. Patent 707,699-A for the battery and charging apparatus would be granted on August 26, 1902, and 718,204-A for the electrical amplifier on January 13, 1903. The device would be used by Queen Alexandra of the United Kingdom at the coronation ceremony for her husband, King Edward, on August 9, 1902, and she would present Hutchinson with a medal in appreciation of his invention. Hutchinson also invented the extremely loud klaxon, leading Mark Twain to remark, "You invented the Klaxon horn to make people deaft, so they'd have to use your acoustic device in order to make them hear again!"
- At the Sandy Hook Proving Ground in New Jersey, the United States Army unveiled its new 12-inch (300 mm) diameter cannon in a competition against the 18-inch (460 mm) "dynamite shell" cannon invented by Louis Gathmann. The army cannon proved to be a weapon powerful enough to sink enemy ships, in that it "not only fired a shell completely through the armor but exploded the shell on the inside, wrecking the target and absolutely destroying the steel construction representing the cofferdam structure of the modern big battleship". A reporter noted that "This feat of sending an armor piercing shell through a thick piece of armor and then exploding it has never before been accomplished in the world." As for Gathmann's weapon, which he had claimed "would reduce an armorplate to powder", "the largest gun in the world proved to be a disastrous failure... barely denting the big armor plate against which it was fired at point blank range."
- The Alpha Sigma Alpha sorority was founded by five students at Virginia State Female Normal School (now Longwood University) in Farmville, Virginia. It now has chapters at 91 universities and colleges, with a chartered purpose "to cultivate friendship among its members, and in every way to create pure and elevating sentiments, to perform such deeds and to mold such opinions as will tend to elevate and ennoble womanhood in the world."

== November 16, 1901 (Saturday) ==
- The first automobile race in Argentina was held in Buenos Aires, at a horse racing track in Hipódromo Argentino de Palermo. Juan Cassoulet won the first event, rounding the 1 kilometre (0.62 mi) dirt track in 49 seconds at a speed of 73.46 kilometres per hour (45.65 mph).
- At least 25 crewmen on the Norwegian steamer Ella were killed when a gale caused their vessel to wreck on the north coast of Newfoundland, near Belle Isle, with the loss of all hands. The Ella was making its last scheduled trip of the year when it departed Montreal the day before carrying cargo to St. John's.
- The Isthmian Canal Commission, led by U.S. Navy Rear Admiral John G. Walker, filed its recommendations with President Theodore Roosevelt, advising that the canal linking the Atlantic and Pacific Oceans should be built across Nicaragua, rather than across the Colombian department of Panama.
- An American automobile record was set by the first car to achieve the speed of "a mile a minute" (60 miles per hour (97 km/h)). The occasion was a race sponsored by the Long Island Automobile Club and held on the Ocean Parkway in Brooklyn, New York.
- Born:
  - Ernest Nagel, Austrian-American philosopher and author of numerous books about logic; in Vágújhely, Austria-Hungary (now Nové Mesto, Slovakia) (d. 1985)
  - Jesse Stone, American rhythms and blues musician; in Atchison, Kansas (d. 1999)
  - Wilhelm Stuckart, Nazi German war criminal, in Wiesbaden; (d. 1953 in an automobile accident)
- Died: Dr. William Manley, 69, British Army war hero and the only person to be awarded both the Victoria Cross and Germany's Iron Cross (b. 1831)

== November 17, 1901 (Sunday) ==
- U.S. Marine Captain David Dixon Porter led several columns of soldiers in an invasion of the island of Samar in the Philippines that included climbing makeshift bamboo ladders to reach enemy fortifications 200 feet (61 m) above his men. For his gallantry in battle, Porter would be awarded the Medal of Honor more than three decades later, in 1934.
- Mehmed Said Pasha was appointed as the Grand Vizier of the Ottoman Empire for a second time, succeeding Halil Rifat Pasha.
- The "Dance of the Forty-One" scandal (El baile de los cuarenta y uno) began when police in Mexico City carried out a raid on a transvestite ballroom dance and arrested 41 young men from Mexico's wealthy families, who "were found dancing with each other, half of them dressed and made up as women". Although the men were neither charged nor tried before a court, the Governor of the Federal District found the 41 men guilty of depravity and sentenced them to hard labor or the choice of serving in the Mexican Army.
- Ten workmen were killed and 28 injured on the Great Northern Railway when their train was struck by a freight train near Culbertson, Montana.
- Born:
  - Irene Baker, U.S. Representative for Tennessee in 1964 when she filled the unexpired term of her late husband, Congressman Howard Baker Sr.; as Edith Irene Bailey in Sevierville, Tennessee (d. 1994)
  - Walter Hallstein, West German diplomat who served as the first President of the European Commission, from 1958 until 1967; in Mainz (d. 1982)
  - Lee Strasberg, Austrian-American actor, director and producer; as Israel Strassberg in Budzanów, Austria-Hungary (now Budaniv, Ukraine) (d. 1982)
  - Joyce Wethered (Lady Heathcoat-Amory) British female golfer, English Ladies' champion from 1920 through 1925; in New Malden, London (d. 1997)

== November 18, 1901 (Monday) ==
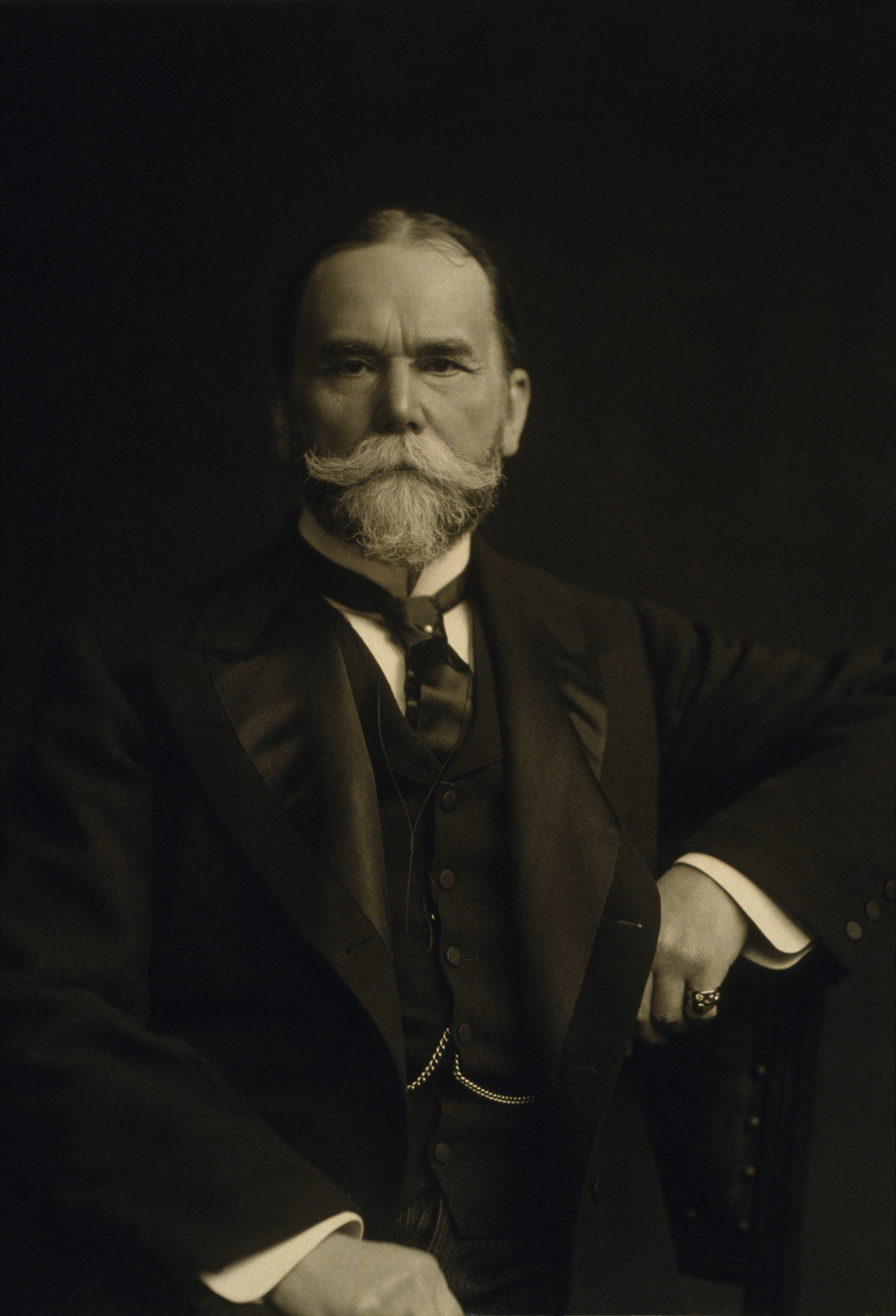
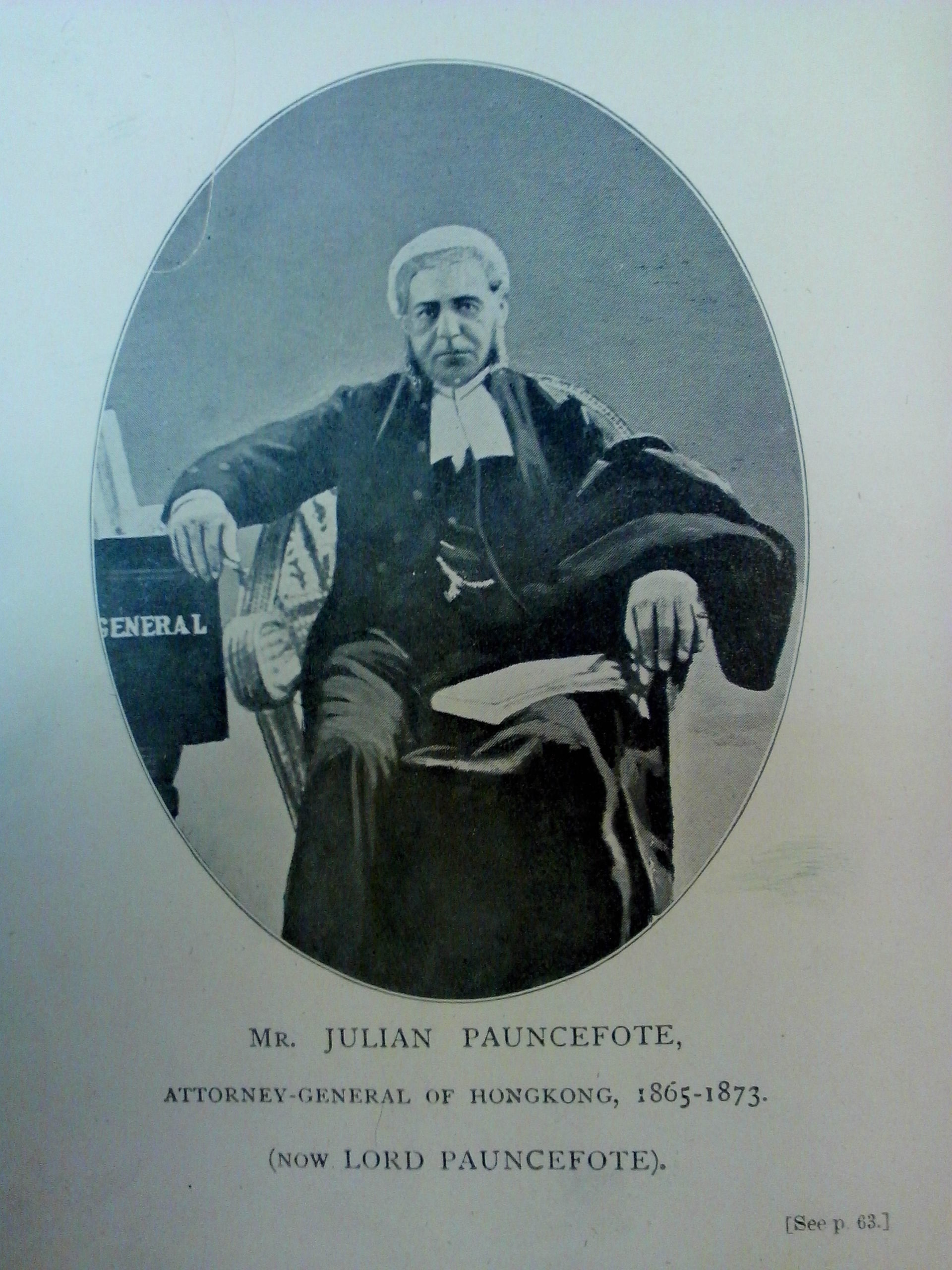
Secretary Hay and Ambassador Pauncefote
- The Hay–Pauncefote Treaty, acknowledging neutrality and partial American control of the proposed Isthmian Canal across Nicaragua, was signed in Washington, D.C. by United States Secretary of State John Hay, and the British Ambassador to the United States, Lord Julian Pauncefote. The new pact, ratified on February 21, 1902, superseded the Clayton–Bulwer Treaty of 1850 and let the United States the right to construct, operate and defend (with fortifications) a canal, in return for guaranteeing that the ships of all nations would be allowed to use it and that the tolls would be equal and fair for users. By agreement of the two nations, the text of the treaty was required to remain a secret until the United States Senate could act upon it. Lord Pauncefote had been sick for several days, and was not expected to sign as scheduled, but had recovered enough to be driven to the United States Department of State for the private signing ceremony.
- Born:
  - George Gallup, American statistician and opinion pollster; in Jefferson, Iowa (d. 1984)
  - V. Shantaram (Shantaram Rajaram Vankudre), Indian film producer and director; in Kolhapur, Bombay Province (now the state of Maharashtra), British India (d. 1990)

== November 19, 1901 (Tuesday) ==
- Inventor David T. Kenney applied for the first patent for a central vacuum cleaning system for an apartment or office building, relying upon a vacuum pump installed in the basement with outlets in every room to which a hose could be connected. U.S. Patent 847,947 would be granted to him on March 19, 1907.
- Henry Pierrepoint performed his first execution as an assistant hangman, assisting London's principal executioner, James Billington in the hanging of Marcel Faugeron at Newgate Prison. Pierrepoint would become Britain's chief hangman in 1905.
- The city of Garner, Iowa, the county seat for Hancock County, was incorporated, 31 years after its founding in 1870.
- Born:
  - Mečislovas Gedvilas, Lithuanian politician who cooperated with the Soviet Union to become the first Premier of the Lithuanian Soviet Socialist Republic, serving from 1940 to 1956; in Bubiai, Lithuania (d. 1981)
  - George P. Larrick, American administrator who served as the Commissioner of the Food and Drug Administration from 1954 to 1965; in Springfield, Ohio (d. 1968)
- Died: Thomas Meehan, 75, British-American botanist nicknamed the "Dean of American Horticulture" (b. 1826)

== November 20, 1901 (Wednesday) ==
- The European Arbitration Court at The Hague ruled that it had no jurisdiction to recognize requests by the two Boer nations (the South African Republic and the Orange Free State) to seek an intervention in the war with the British Empire.
- Near Telluride, Colorado, 30 employees of the Smuggler-Union Coal Company Mine died from smoke inhalation produced by a fire in an outlying building. Because of wind conditions and lower air pressure inside the mine, the smoke was pulled into the mine tunnels, where 100 men had been working.
- Almost 33 centuries after his death in 1397 BC, the tomb of the Egyptian pharaoh Amenhotep II was pilfered by grave robbers. Archaeologist Howard Carter had kept the king's sarcophagus and a display of objects behind a locked iron gate, which the burglars were able to pick. Police would track footprints from the Valley of the Kings at Biban el Moluk to the village of Goorneh (Qena) and arrest three men, albeit without recovering any stolen items.
- Following a two-day trial in Palatka, Florida, J. B. Brown, a black railroad employee was convicted of an October 17 murder, and a death warrant was issued the same day by the Putnam County court. On the day of the hanging, the death warrant would be read aloud as Brown stood on the gallows with the rope around his neck "but to the great astonishment of all... it ordered the execution of the foreman of the jury which had found Brown guilty," as Yale University law professor Edwin Borchard would note later, adding "It is perhaps needless to remark that no one was hanged on that warrant." The state governor would commute Brown's death sentence to life imprisonment, but Brown would be freed in 1913 after the verified deathbed confession of the real killer, who exonerated Brown. After almost 12 years incarceration, Governor Park Trammell would pardon Brown at the urging of the judge and the prosecuting attorney.
- Born: P. R. Stephensen, Australian publisher and political activist who changed his orientation from the leftist Communist Party of Australia to the rightist Australia First Movement during his career; in Maryborough, Queensland; (d. 1965)

== November 21, 1901 (Thursday) ==
- Richard Strauss's opera Feuersnot (Lack of Fire) had its premiere performance, at the Royal Opera House in Dresden.
- Colonel Arthur Lynch of the Irish Transvaal Brigade of the Boer Army, who had taken arms against the British Army in the ongoing Second Boer War, was elected to the British House of Commons in absentia by voters in the Galway Borough, defeating his Unionist Party opponent, Horace Plunkett, by a margin of 1,247 to 473. Lynch, who was in exile in Paris, was warned that "he will be arrested on the charge of high treason the moment he steps foot on British soil."

== November 22, 1901 (Friday) ==
- With the Ottoman Empire treasury empty, the ministerial council at Constantinople voted to borrow 40,000 pounds from the Sacred Caravan.
- Prokopios, the Metropolitan of Greece and spiritual leader of the Greek Orthodox Church, resigned after student protests over the translation of the New Testament from classical Greek into the modern Greek language. The Commissioner of the Greek Police and the prefect resigned as well.
- Diplomats from the United Kingdom and Italy signed an agreement at Rome to discuss the boundary of the frontier between Anglo-Egyptian Sudan and the Italian colony of Eritrea.
- President Cipriano Castro of Venezuela ordered the arrest of his Minister of War, Ramon Guerra.
- The government of Colombia informed the United States that its government could not guarantee protection from rebels for American transit across the Isthmus of Panama, at that time still a part of Colombia. In response, USS Iowa landed a battalion of men on the Pacific coast as a show of force.
- Florida Agricultural College, which would become the University of Florida in 1903 and relocate from Lake City, Florida, to a new campus in Gainesville in 1905, played its first-ever college football game (and the first college football game in Florida), traveling to Jacksonville to play against Stetson University. Stetson took a 6–0 lead and held on to it after a tree stump in the middle of the field blocked the FAC Aggies' drive. When the teams were relocated to face the other end zone, the Florida drive lost its momentum and was halted. Although FAC was the predecessor to the University of Florida, the 1901 game (FAC's only game that year) is not considered by the university to be part of its official scores, and the first Florida Gators football game is recorded as a 16–6 win over the Gainesville Athletic Club on October 13, 1906.
- Born: Joaquín Rodrigo, Spanish composer and pianist; in Sagunto (d. 1999)

== November 23, 1901 (Saturday) ==
- Harvard University (11–0–0) and Yale University (11–0–1), both unbeaten, met each other for the unofficial national championship of college football on the Harvard campus at Cambridge, Massachusetts. The game was no contest (Walter Camp would write that "It was Harvard's day from start to finish") and Harvard won, 22–0, in front of a crowd of 37,000 people. The University of Michigan, which would also go unbeaten, is recognized as well by the NCAA as the 1901 champion.
- Troops of the British Army made the first of four raids on rebel Mahsud tribesmen in the Waziristan section of what is now Pakistan, but was part of British India at the time. The first engagement lasted about four days and successfully drove the rebels out of the Khaisara valley; the Mahsuds would finally comply with the British government on March 10, 1902.
- Albert Einstein submitted his first doctoral dissertation to Switzerland's Federal Institute of Technology (Eidgenössische Technische Hochschule) in Zürich, under the supervision of Alfred Kleiner of the University of Zurich. At Dr. Kleiner's suggestion, Einstein would withdraw the dissertation on February 2 because its criticism of physicist Ludwig Boltzmann was too harsh.
- The Broadway theatre district of Manhattan acquired its nickname of "The Great White Way", conferred by New York Morning Telegram columnist Shep Friedman. "By sheer coincidence," a writer would note later, "when people woke up that morning to read the Telegram, the city had been blanketed by snow and Broadway was, indeed, a "great white way".
- Popular American singer and comedian Len Spencer recorded one of the first novelty songs available for a record player, preserving his comic skit set to the tune of The Arkansas Traveler, providing the voices for the two speakers, an inquisitive stranger traveling through Arkansas, and a fiddle-playing bumpkin who gives sarcastic answers.
- The office of British Colonial Secretary Joseph Chamberlain gave its formal approval for the October 17, 1900, concessions between His Majesty's Government and King Lewanika of Barotseland in southern Africa.
- A campaign to create a national soccer football league in Paraguay was commenced with a match in Asunción, the capital of the South American nation. The impetus came from a physical education teacher from the Netherlands, Willem Paats, who would field the first major team, Club Olimpia, on July 25, 1902.
- Born: Marieluise Fleißer, German author and playwright; at Ingolstadt (d. 1974)

== November 24, 1901 (Sunday) ==
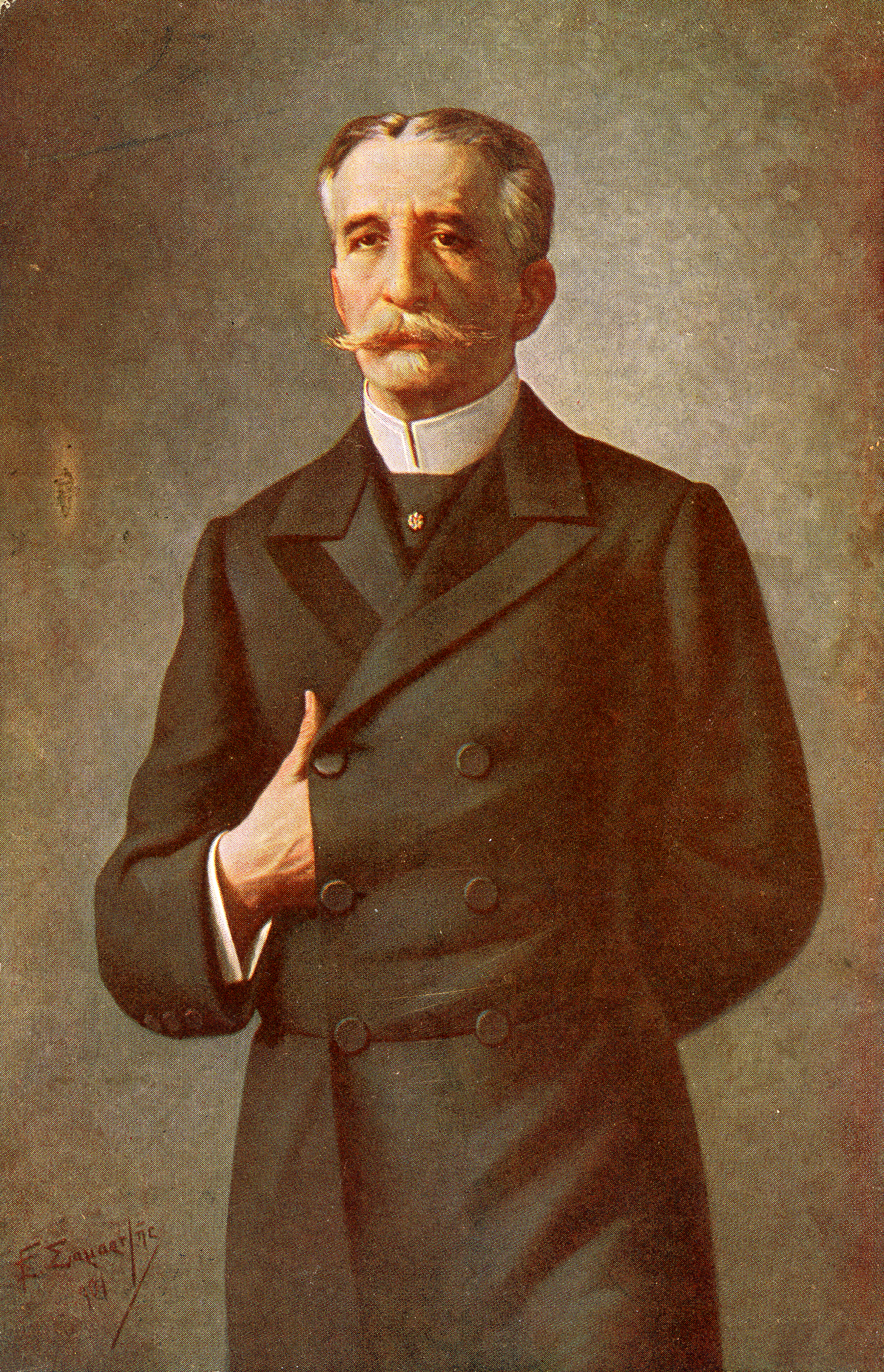
Prime Minister Theotokis

- Georgios Theotokis, the Prime Minister of Greece resigned along with his entire cabinet as riots over the Gospel translation continued, and Alexandros Zaimis was appointed as the new Premier.
- The American Holland submarine Fulton set a new record by remaining undersea for 15 consecutive hours, resurfacing off of the coast of Greenport, New York, at 10:30 in the morning, after submerging at 7:30 the previous evening. The six people on board (Engineer Frank Cable, U.S. Navy Lieutenant Arthur MacArthur III, retired Rear Admiral John Lowe, machinist John Wilson, engineer John Saunder, and electrician Henry Morrel) "were alive and well and as fresh as if they had been sealed up in a boat only a few minutes instead of many hours."
- Born:
  - André Tchelistcheff, Russian-American winemaker; in Moscow (d. 1994)
  - Gavin Gordon, Scottish ballet composer; in Ayr, Ayrshire (d. 1970)
  - Stanley Barrent, American circus performer who was billed as "Sealo the Seal Boy" as a sideshow attraction in freak shows because of his congenital condition of phocomelia that gave him "seal-like arms"; in Pittsburgh (d. 1980)
  - William McCulloch, American Congressman and civil rights activist who represented Ohio for 25 years from 1947 to 1973; near Holmesville, Ohio (d. 1980)
  - William Henry Vanderbilt III, American financier, Governor of Rhode Island 1939 to 1941; in New York City (d. 1981)

== November 25, 1901 (Monday) ==
- Gustav Mahler's Fourth Symphony was performed for the first time, with Mahler himself conducting the Kaim Orchestra in Munich.
- Prince Itō Hirobumi, the former Prime Minister of Japan and envoy of Prime Minister Katsura Tarō, arrived in Saint Petersburg, Russia, to begin meetings with Russian Foreign Minister Vladimir Lamsdorf to negotiate with the Russians regarding their use of the Korean peninsula. Ito, who had visited the United States in October, was presented with the Order of St. Alexander Nevsky by Tsar Nicholas.
- A regiment of the U.S. Marines arrived at Colombia's Panamanian Isthmus on the battleship USS Iowa, in order to re-establish railroad transit across the isthmus.
- France's Chamber of Deputies voted 295 to 249 to compromise its indemnity from China for Boxer Rebellion reparations, settling on the amount of 265 million French francs, worth 53 million American dollars at the time.
- Born:
  - Rudolf Höss, German war criminal and commandant of the Auschwitz concentration camp; in Baden-Baden (d. 1947, executed)
  - Tibor Serly, Hungarian-American composer and violinist; in Losonc, Austria-Hungary (now Lučenec, Slovakia) (d. 1978)

== November 26, 1901 (Tuesday) ==
- Dr. Alois Alzheimer, a German psychiatrist at the Hospital for the Mentally Ill and Epileptics in Frankfurt, had his first meeting with the patient who would become the first person to be diagnosed with Alzheimer's disease. Auguste Deter, the 51-year-old wife of an office clerk, had been admitted to the hospital the day before, after having gradually deteriorated over eight months that had started with delusions and memory loss in March. After her death on April 8, 1906, Alzheimer would examine samples of her brain taken at autopsy, and publish his findings about "Auguste D." in a paper titled On a Peculiar, Severe Disease Process of the Cerebral Cortex.
- Firefighter Thomas Jellef of the Cincinnati Fire Department in Ohio died on duty of a heart attack.
- Twenty-seven employees of the Penberthy Injector Company in Detroit were killed by the explosion of a boiler. The blast, which happened at the company's factory at Abbott Street and Brooklyn Avenue, happened at 9:30 in the morning and leveled the three-story-high manufacturing building.

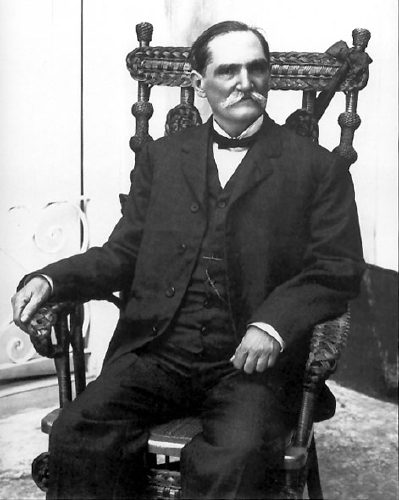
Former U.S. citizen Estrada

- Cuban native Tomás Estrada Palma, who had been a U.S. citizen for more than 20 years and had served as a schoolmaster in New York state, renounced his American citizenship so that he could run for President of Cuba. He would win the election and take office as Cuba's first President on May 20, 1902.
- Born: William "Deak" Parsons, U.S. Navy officer and ordnance expert who served as the weaponeer who armed the atomic bomb dropped on Hiroshima in 1945; in Evanston, Illinois (d. 1953). Captain Parsons traveled with the nuclear weapon on the airplane Enola Gay and inserted the powder charge and detonator as the plane approached its target. He was promoted to rear admiral after the end of World War II.

== November 27, 1901 (Wednesday) ==
- Seventy-five people were killed in the collision of two express trains on the Wabash Railroad, near Seneca Township, Michigan. Wabash No. 13 from Detroit was westbound, bringing several coaches of passengers, most of them contract workers from Italy. The "Continental Limited", Wabash's No. 4 train, was eastbound on the same track, and its engineer had an order which he had misread as "Pass at Sand Creek", when it actually said "Pass at Seneca", a few miles closer, meaning that he was to pull over at Seneca to give a pass to oncoming trains. Instead, the engineer took the train past Seneca and, shortly after 7:00 in the evening, the crew of the Continental found itself on a collision course with the No. 13.
- The United States Army War College was ordered created by General Order 155 from United States Secretary of War Elihu Root, and would admit its first students in 1904. Initially opened in Washington, D.C., it would be relocated 50 years later to Carlisle, Pennsylvania.
- Led by Matti Kurrika and Matti Halminen of Finland, the Kalevan Kansa Colonization Company leased Malcolm Island from the provincial government of British Columbia in order to found a colony that they named Sointula, from the Finnish word for a musical chord, sointu. Within less than a year, Kurrika would resign from the company and depart the island with about half of the colonists and attempt to set up a new utopian community in another part of the province.
- Born: Ted Husing, pioneering American sports broadcaster; in The Bronx, New York City (d. 1962)
- Died: Clement Studebaker, 70, American blacksmith who created the world's largest manufacturer of horse-drawn wagons and carriages (b. 1831). At the time of his death, he and his family were working upon making the transition to manufacturing motor vehicles, and the first Studebaker automobile would be produced in 1902.

== November 28, 1901 (Thursday) ==
- The British Army commenced an attack on the slave trading Aro tribesmen with an assault on their stronghold of Aro Chukwu in Nigeria, subduing the area by December 24. Within five months, the British were able to take control of the 6,000 square mile African kingdom.
- Sultan Mubarak Al-Sabah of Kuwait was given an ultimatum by the Ottoman Empire, by way of the naqib al-ashraf of Basra, directed to report to Constantinople for an "honorable retirement", or be removed by an invasion force. Mubarak appealed to the Royal Navy of Britain for assistance and was able to keep his throne.
- The University of Michigan (9–0–0) closed out its football schedule with a 50–0 win over the University of Iowa (6–2–0), playing before 10,000 people at West Side Park in Chicago, the stadium for the Chicago Cubs baseball team. On the same day in Chicago, the University of Wisconsin (8–0–0) closed out its season against the University of Chicago (8–5–2), with a 35–0 win. Michigan and Wisconsin were both members of what would become the Big Ten Conference but were not scheduled to meet; Michigan was considered the conference champion because it had played four conference games while Wisconsin had played only two. With their win, the Michigan Wolverines finished unbeaten, untied, and unscored upon (501 points against a combined zero for their opponents), and qualified to be invited to the first postseason college football game, the 1902 Rose Bowl (which they would win, 49–0).
- The new Constitution of Alabama went into effect, along with a disenfranchisement provision that required voters in the state to pass a literacy test in order to qualify to vote. However, people who had an ancestor who fought in the American Civil War were exempted, effectively requiring most African Americans to pass the test to the satisfaction of the voting registrar.
- Featherweight boxing champion "Terrible Terry" McGovern lost his title to Young Corbett II (William J. Rothwell) in the second round of a bout in Hartford, Connecticut. The two would fight a rematch in San Francisco on March 23, 1902, and McGovern would lose again.
- Born:
  - Carl Agar, pioneering Canadian helicopter pilot who developed techniques to airlift heavy loads to high altitude locations; in Lion's Head, Ontario (d. 1968)
  - Major General Roy Urquhart, British Army officer known for his role in the Battle of Arnhem, in Shepperton, Surrey (d. 1988)
  - Óscar Diego Gestido, who was elected President of Uruguay in 1967, but who served for only nine months before dying in office; in Montevideo (d. 1967)
  - Edwina Mountbatten, Countess Mountbatten of Burma, the last Vicereine of British India (as wife of the Viceroy, Lord Mountbatten); as Edwina Ashley near Romsey, Hampshire(d. 1960)
  - Walter Havighurst, American novelist and social historian; in Appleton, Wisconsin (d. 1994)
- Died:
  - Moses Dickson, 77, African-American abolitionist who organized the Knights of Liberty paramilitary organization prior to the American Civil War, and the International Order of Twelve of Knights and Daughters of Tabor self-help organization afterward (b. 1824)
  - Brigadier General William Hugh Young, 63, Confederate States Army officer who was captured as a prisoner of war at the Battle of Allatoona, later serving as editor of the San Antonio Express (b. 1838)

== November 29, 1901 (Friday) ==
- John Francis Queeny, a chemist in St. Louis, filed the paperwork to incorporate the Monsanto Chemical Works, Inc. as a manufacturer of food additives. During the 20th century, Monsanto would become one of the world's largest chemical and biotechnology corporations.
- The Colombian (now Panamanian) city of Colón was peacefully transferred to the control of Colombian Government Forces under the command of General Alban, after foreign warships arrived at the port.
- Led by Thomas J. Hickey, baseball team owners met at the Leland Hotel in Chicago and founded the American Association, a minor baseball league that would be independent of the minor league organization because it "considers itself out of the minor class, although admittedly not on a par in playing strength with the National or American Leagues." The new AA took three of the cities of the Western League that had been created in 1901 by the National League, with Minneapolis and Saint Paul, Minnesota; Kansas City, Missouri, as well as moving into Milwaukee, which had recently been vacated by the American League, and added new franchises in Columbus and Toledo, Ohio; Indianapolis, and Louisville. Those eight cities would remain in the AA from 1902 until the end of the 1952 season. The old Western League would reorganize with six teams in Denver and Colorado Springs, Colorado; Des Moines and Sioux City, Iowa; St. Joseph, Missouri; and Lincoln, Nebraska.
- Russian playwright Zinaida Gippius and her husband, novelist Dmitry Merezhkovsky, held the first meeting of the "Religious-Philosophical Society" (Religiozno-Filosofskie Sobraniya) in Saint Petersburg, convening at the Ministry of Public Education building after being granted permission by Russian Orthodox Church Procurator Konstantin Pobedonostsev and after the Metropolitan Bishop of Petersburg gave his assent for clerical participation. The Society, "which sought to bring about a rapprochement between the intelligentsia and the church" would hold 22 meetings between members of the clergy and university scholars, before Pobedonostsev ordered it closed on April 5, 1903.
- Born: Mildred Harris, American actress; in Cheyenne, Wyoming (d. 1944)
- Died: Francesc Pi i Maragall, 77, President of the First Spanish Republic for five weeks in 1873 (b. 1824)

== November 30, 1901 (Saturday) ==
- In order to capitalize on Henry Ford's recent fame as the winner of an auto race on October 10, investors reorganized the Detroit Automobile Company and incorporated it as the Henry Ford Company, giving Ford a one-sixth share of ownership in return for the use of his name. Despite the use of the Ford name, the Henry Ford Company was not an early name for the Ford Motor Company; instead, it was the ancestor of the luxury car division of General Motors, which would rebrand itself in 1902 as the Cadillac Motor Company after Henry Ford's parting of ways with his co-investors.
- Lord Tennyson, the Governor of South Australia, ordered that the dry lakebed of Lake Callabonna be put off limits to the general public, in order to protect the rich Pleistocene era fossils that had been unearthed for nearly ten years.
- U.S. President Theodore Roosevelt fired Oklahoma Territory Governor William M. Jenkins, writing that "Governor Jenkins of Oklahoma is hereby removed because of his improper connection with a contract between the Territory and the Oklahoma Sanitarium Company," a deal which had included a reservation of $10,000 worth of company stock for Jenkins to own. Thompson B. Ferguson was appointed as the new Governor.
- Seminary student Angelo Roncalli, who would become Pope John XXIII more than 50 years later, was inducted into the Italian Army as a private, reporting to the Umberto Barracks in Bergamo for compulsory military service. His diocese would pay a 1,200 lire fee to have his term in the army reduced, but Private Roncalli, who would later describe 1902 as "my year of the Babylonian Captivity", still had to serve for twelve months,
- Died: Edward John Eyre, 86, English explorer (b. 1815)
