= Harvard Union =

- U.S. National Register of Historic Places
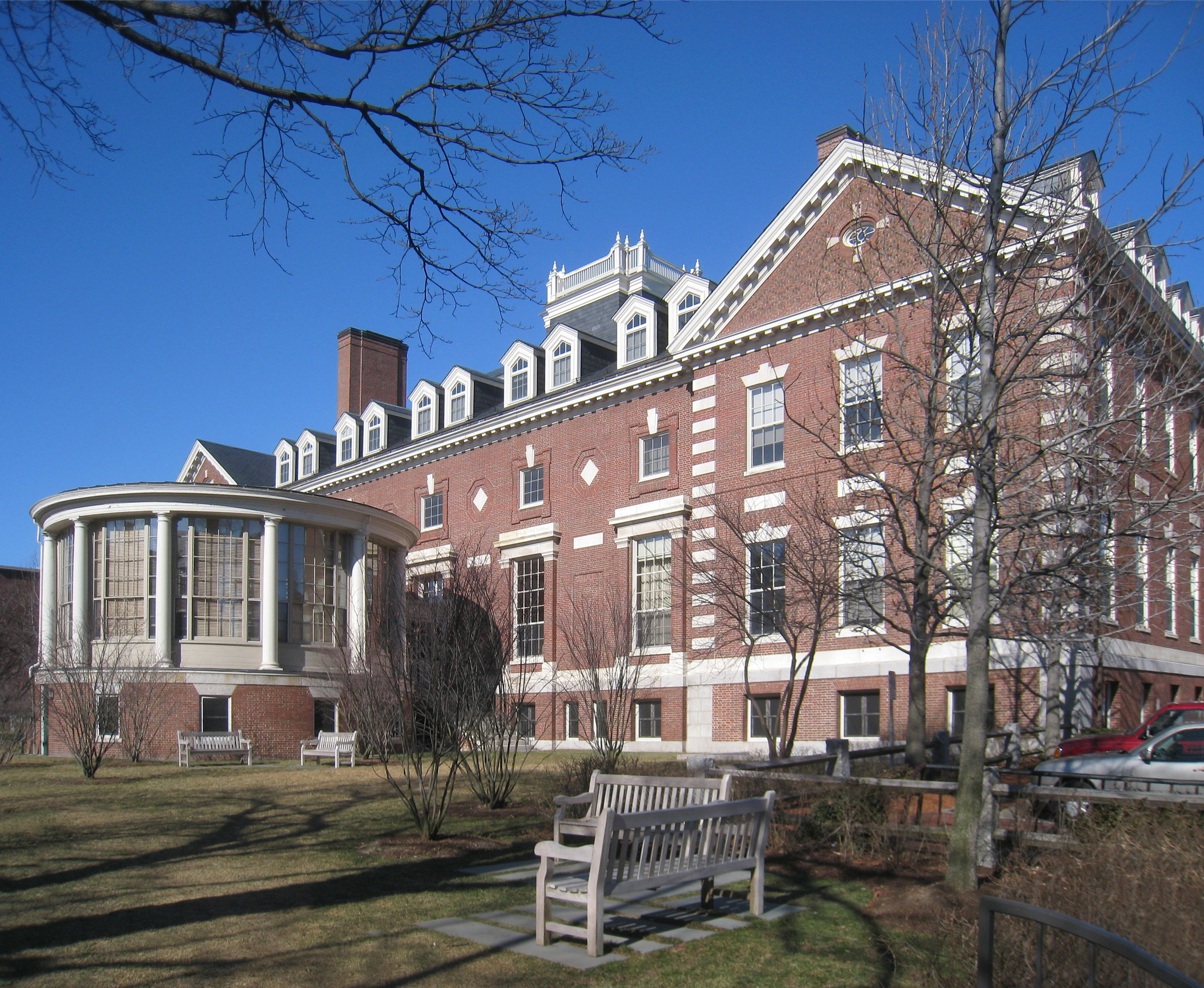

- Location within Massachusetts Location within the United States
- Location: Cambridge, Massachusetts
- Coordinates: 42°22′21.3″N 71°06′52.4″W
- Built: 1900
- Architect: McKim, Mead & White
- Architectural style: Colonial Revival
- MPS: Cambridge MRA
- NRHP reference No.: 87000500
- Added to NRHP: January 26, 1987

Harvard Union, now known as the Barker Center and once known as the Freshman Union, is a historic building on Quincy and Harvard Streets in Cambridge, Massachusetts.

== History ==
The union was designed McKim, Mead & White and built in 1900; it was their first commission on the Harvard University campus. It is a large 2-1/2 story brick building, with neo-Georgian styling that is more reminiscent of English Georgian architecture than that found in North America. The building was sensitively enlarged in 1911 (to design by Thomas Mott Shaw) to include the Varsity Club.

The concept of the union was to provide a social space to students otherwise not members of the university's more exclusive final clubs. It was "made possible by the gift of Mr. Henry Lee Higginson, who was the donor also of Soldier's Field, and is a club which every member of the university may join; the annual dues are ten dollars. It has a very large and fine building, with a magnificent hall, comfortable reading-rooms, pleasant dining-rooms, and a good library. But its very size and comprehensiveness prevent it from fulfilling one of the most important functions of a club, the promotion of friendships. It serves many useful purposes, it makes a convenient rallying-point, but there is in it no club feeling or life."

For some fifty years it was the freshman dining hall. Its interior was mostly demolished when it was converted into the Barker Center for Humanities in the 1990s. The Union was added to the National Register of Historic Places in 1987.

== See also ==
- National Register of Historic Places listings in Cambridge, Massachusetts
