= Pierce City Fire Station, Courthouse and Jail =

- U.S. National Register of Historic Places
- Location within Missouri Location within the United States
- Location: Walnut St., Pierce City, Missouri
- Coordinates: 36°56′44″N 94°0′11″W
- Area: less than one acre
- Built: 1886
- Architectural style: Italianate
- NRHP reference No.: 98001108
- Added to NRHP: August 28, 1998

Pierce City Fire Station, Courthouse and Jail is a historic multipurpose fire station, courthouse, and jail building located at Pierce City, Lawrence County, Missouri. It was built in 1886, and is a two-story, Italianate style brick building. It measures 25 feet by 75 feet. It features a distinctive square, hipped roof bell tower and tall vertically oriented windows topped by rectangular topped hoods. The building was the focal point of a race riot August 18–20, 1901, which received national attention and, in part, inspired Mark Twains essay "The United States of Lyncherdom".

It was listed on the National Register of Historic Places in 1998.
