= Thomas Beloat =

American sheriff (1855–1946)

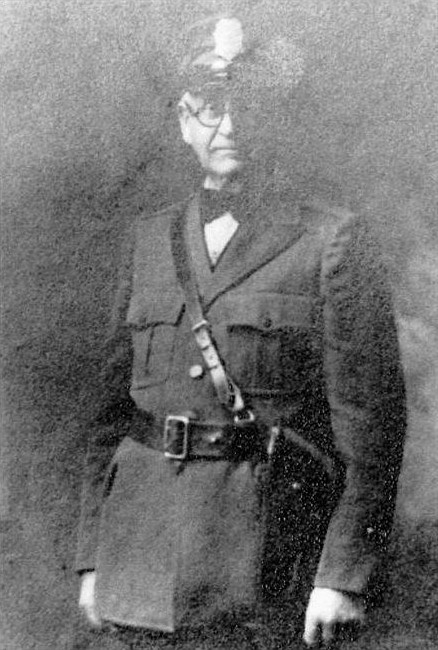
- Born: Thomas Beloat; February 6, 1855 near Fort Branch, Indiana, U.S.
- Died: February 23, 1946 (aged 91); Princeton, Indiana, U.S.
- Known for: Stopping a lynching in Princeton, Indiana
- Police career
- Allegiance: United States
- Department: Gibson County Sheriff's Office
- Service years: 1901–1904 (as sheriff)
- Rank: Sheriff
- Other work: Deputy fish and game warden

Thomas Beloat (February 6, 1855 – February 23, 1946) was an American sheriff of Gibson County, Indiana at the turn of the 20th century noted for stopping a lynching in the county seat of Princeton. He was the subject of a June 10, 1901 article in the New York Tribune. Beloat was one of two law enforcement officials whose bravery in preventing lynchings in early 20th-century America was noted by Mark Twain in his 1901 essay The United States of Lyncherdom.

Beloat was born on February 6, 1855, near Fort Branch, Indiana.

A Republican, he served as sheriff from January 1, 1901, to December 31, 1904. He was a charter member of the Gibson County Sons of Veterans organization.

On June 11, 1901, Beloat prevented the lynching of Henry Reynolds. Reynolds, a 19-year-old white man, was accused of raping a 14-year-old white girl named Lydia Case. Twain credited Beloat for taking precautions to prevent Reynolds from being lynched after his arrest in Mount Carmel, Illinois. After learning that a group of 50 men were coming to lynch Reynolds, his preliminary hearing was halted and he was transferred to the custody of Beloat, who placed him under armed guard. Reynolds went on trial on August 14, 1901. At his trial, he admitted to having sex with Lydia, but claimed that she'd submitted to his advances and he thought she was a woman. However, Lydia had previously stated that Reynolds had raped her at gunpoint. The following day, Reynolds was convicted of rape and sentenced to 1 to 21 years in prison.

In 1919, Beloat was named as deputy fish and game warden for the first congressional district of Indiana, serving in this capacity for fifteen years.

Beloat died in Princeton on February 23, 1946, at the age of 91.
