= September 1901 =

Month in 1901

| << | September 1901 | | | | | >> |
| Su | Mo | Tu | We | Th | Fr | Sa |
| 1 | 2 | 3 | 4 | 5 | 6 | 7 |
| 8 | 9 | 10 | 11 | 12 | 13 | 14 |
| 15 | 16 | 17 | 18 | 19 | 20 | 21 |
| 22 | 23 | 24 | 25 | 26 | 27 | 28 |
| 29 | 30 |

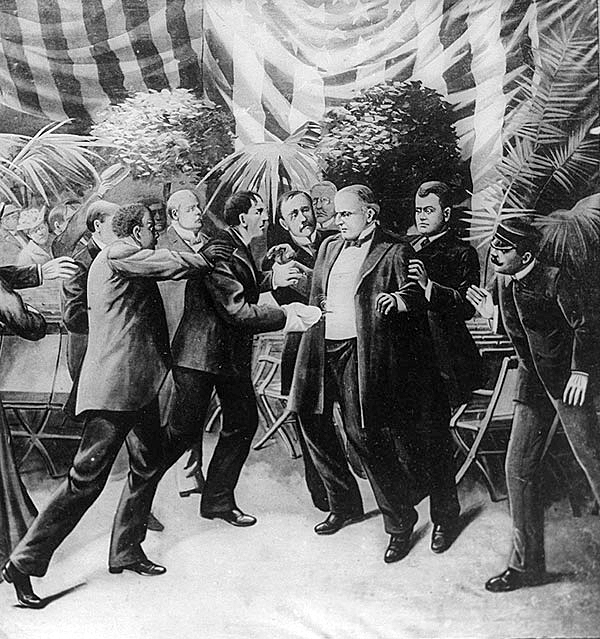
September 6, 1901: U.S. President William McKinley fatally wounded by fair visitor

The following events occurred in September 1901:

== September 1, 1901 (Sunday) ==
- The Philippine Commission, composed of Governor William Howard Taft and four other Americans, added its first native Filipino members to have a vote on creating new laws for the American-occupied Philippine Islands. Benito Legarda, Trinidad Pardo de Tavera and Jose du Luzuriaga increased the size of the legislative body to eight people.
- The first section of the Hejaz railway, intended to connect Istanbul to the holy city of Mecca in the Kingdom of Hejaz (now part of Saudi Arabia), was completed, with a short section in Syria, running from Muzayrib to Daraa.
- Four missionaries of the Church of Jesus Christ of Latter-day Saints became the first to bring the Mormon religion to Japan. Heber J. Grant, who would later become the 7th President of the Church, was joined by Louis A. Kelsch, Horace S. Ensign and Alma O. Taylor. "However, much like the myriad Western faiths that have attempted to convert the Japanese people to their brand of spirituality," an author would later note, "the LDS Church has found only limited success in Japan."
- Floods in Cleveland caused $500,000 worth of damage, equivalent to $13 million in 2016 dollars.
- Born: Arthur Edward Murphy, American philosopher; in Ithaca, New York (d. 1962)

== September 2, 1901 (Monday) ==
- Lord Curzon, the British Viceroy of India, convened a group of educational officers at Simla to discuss a reform of the higher education system. Those present were members of the Executive Council, the colonial Director of Public Instruction, the Vice-Chancellors of the universities in Bombay and Madras, and the principals of the Deccan College and the Madras School of Arts, all Britons, and not a single Indian. Starting with the premise that university education in India had "suffered... by a too slavish imitation of English models", including an over-reliance on entrance examinations, Curzon oversaw 16 days of meetings and drafted 150 resolutions for reform.
- Dr. William A. Pusey of the University of Illinois began the first experiments with radiation treatment for cancer, using x-rays in an attempt to combat sarcoma in 11 patients. Pusey described the patient as a "man, aged twenty-four" who had had a tumor removed from his neck two weeks earlier and was found to have round-celled sarcoma. "He was given vigorous x-ray exposures and the tumor mass began to subside immediately," Dr. Pusey wrote later, adding "At the end of four weeks... the tumor had entirely disappeared."
- Vice President of the United States Theodore Roosevelt became identified with the words, "Speak softly and carry a big stick" at the Minnesota State Fair in Minneapolis. The phrase was not his own invention, as he told his audience that "A good many of you are probably acquainted with the old proverb, 'Speak softly and carry a big stick— and you will go far.'" He added that "If a man continually blusters, if he lacks civility, a big stick will not save him from trouble; and neither will speaking softly avail, if back of the softness there does not lie strength, power ... if the boaster is not prepared to back up his words, his position becomes absolutely contemptible. So it is with the nation. It is both foolish and undignified to indulge in undue self-glorification, and, above all, in loose-tongued denunciation of other peoples. Let us make it evident that we intend to do justice. Then let us make it equally evident that we will not tolerate injustice in return." The phrase had been used by Roosevelt (as Governor of New York) in a 1900 newspaper interview, and he attributed it at time to being a motto "taken from the South African people".
- Born:
  - Adolph Rupp, American college basketball coach; in Halstead, Kansas (d. 1977)
  - Franz Karmasin, ethnic German native of Austria-Hungary who administered the Slovak State created from the German annexation of Czechoslovakia; in Olmütz (now Olomouc, Czech Republic) (d. 1970)

== September 3, 1901 (Tuesday) ==
- The Board of Judges of the competition to design the new Australian Flag announced in Melbourne that it had selected five finalists from 32,823 proposals. The day before, the Board report noted that the members had concluded that any design should have the British "Union Jack on a blue or red ground", "A six-pointed star, representing the six federated States of Australia, immediately underneath the Union Jack and pointing direct to the centre of the Saint George's Cross, of a size to occupy the major portion of one quarter of the flag"; and the Southern Cross constellation. The finalists were artist Annie Dorrington of Perth; ships officer William Stevens of Auckland, New Zealand; a teenaged optician's apprentice, Leslie Hawkins of Sydney; architect Egbert John Nuttall of Melbourne; and 14-year old schoolboy Ivor Evans of Melbourne.
- The "Miss Stone Affair", sometimes described as "America's first hostage crisis" began when an American missionary, Miss Ellen Stone, was kidnapped by terrorists who demanded a ransom from the Ottoman Empire. Miss Stone and her pregnant Bulgarian colleague, Katerina Stefanova Cilka, were traveling through Bulgaria on horseback with a party of ten other students and teachers. At a point between Bansko and Gorna Dzhumaya (now Blagoevgrad), the group was surrounded by about 30 masked men, who took Miss Stone and Mrs. Cilka away while leaving the others unharmed. The United States would eventually agree to pay the ransom on January 13, 1902, and Stone, Cilka, and Mrs. Cilka's child would be freed on February 10.
- Responding to Lord Kitchener's proclamation of August 7 directing that Boer troops surrender by September 15 or be deported from South Africa to other British territory, Boer General Christiaan de Wet issued a proclamation that all British troops found in the Orange River Colony after September 15 would be shot. On the same day, Jan Smuts, the Assistant Commandant General of the Transvaal Army, crossed into the British Cape Colony and prepared for a major invasion to divert British troops.
- Three men, James Outram and his guides, Christian Bohren and Christian Hasler, became the first people to climb to the top of Mount Assiniboine, an 11,870 foot (3,620 m) peak in the Canadian Rockies. After reaching the top, Outram would write later, "One at a time— the other two securely anchored— we crawled with utmost caution to the actual highest point and peeped over the edge of the huge, overhanging crest, down the sheer wall to a great, shining glacier 6,000 feet or more below."

== September 4, 1901 (Wednesday) ==
- Kaiser Wilhelm met with Prince Zaifeng, the 18-year-old brother of the Emperor of China, at Potsdam. As demanded by Germany and made one of the 11 conditions of the Boxer Protocol, an imperial prince delivered his message of his nation's atonement for the murder of Germany's ambassador, Baron von Ketteler, in 1900 during the Boxer Rebellion. After the Kaiser accepted China's regrets, Zaifeng toured Germany and the rest of Europe for three weeks, and participated in several military reviews as a guest of the German royal family. Earlier in the week, the Kaiser agreed to waive the normal procedure where visitors had to make a deep bow to the German Emperor, a humbling gesture which would have added to the humiliation of China's capitulation to the German.
- U.S. President William McKinley arrived in Buffalo, New York, by train for a three-day visit to the Pan-American Exposition. As the Presidential Special passed the United States Army post at Fort Porter, three cannons fired a 21-gun salute in the President's honor. "Unfortunately the guns had been placed far too close to the tracks," a historian would write later, "and as the train reached the spot, a booming report shattered all seven windows on the right side of the first car." The presidential party was in the second car, however, and the only two people in the damaged coach were a newspaper reporter and an official of the Lake Shore and Michigan Southern Railway, neither of whom was injured.

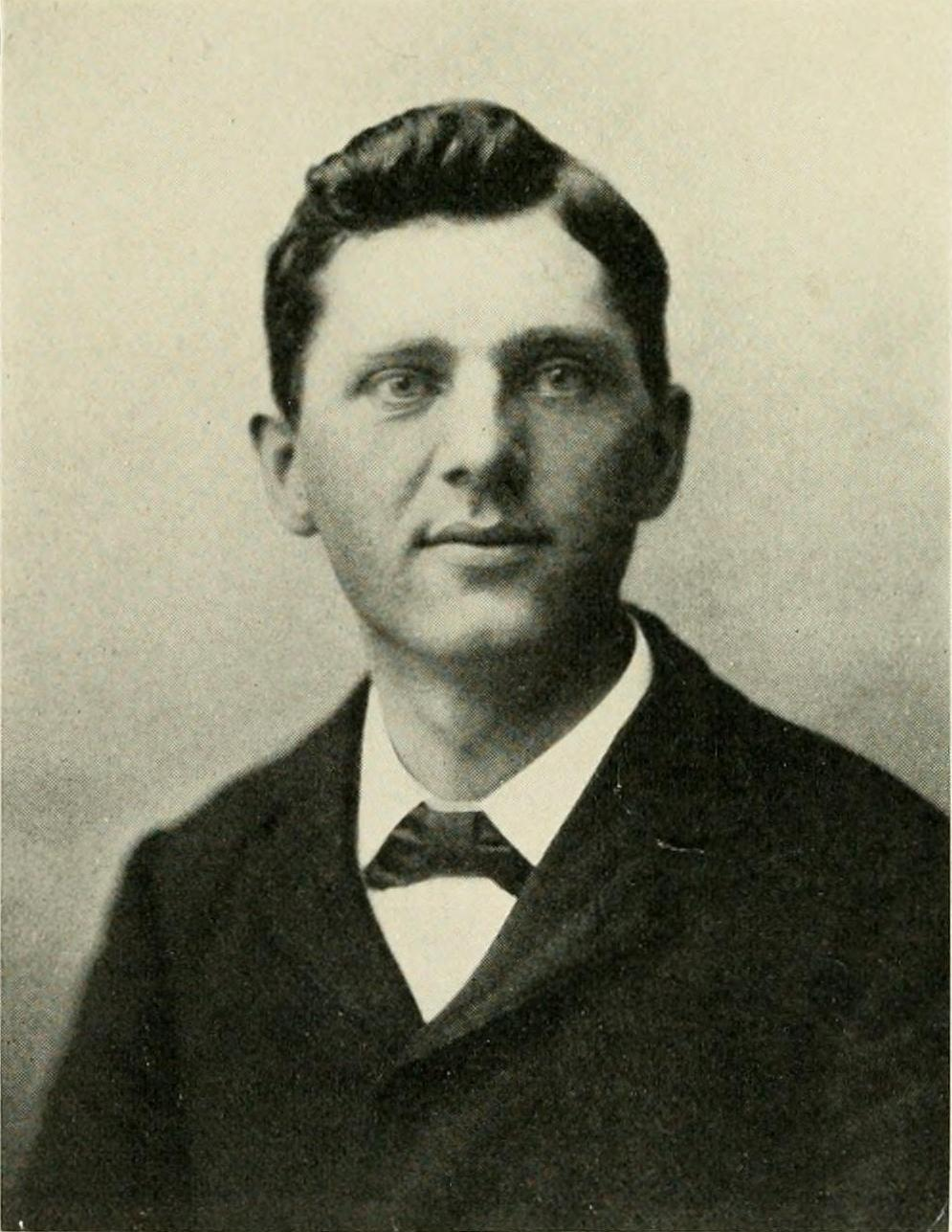
Leon Czolgosz

- On the morning of McKinley's arrival, Leon Czolgosz made up his mind to shoot President William McKinley, and purchased a .32 caliber revolver. According to the statement he would make to the police days later, he said that the resolution "was in my heart; there was no escape for me. I could not have conquered it had my life been at stake," and said that he was standing "near the railroad gate when the Presidential party arrived" and that the police forced him and everyone else back "so that the great ruler could pass." Czolgosz, who was confused about what day of the week McKinley arrived and spoke, claimed that when the President made his speech, he "stood right near the President, right under him near the stand from which he spoke."

== September 5, 1901 (Thursday) ==
- The National Association of Professional Baseball Leagues was formed in Chicago by seven minor baseball leagues: the International League (at the time named the Eastern League), the Western League, the Illinois–Indiana–Iowa League (commonly referred to as the Three-I League), the Pacific Northwest League, the Western Association, the New England League and the New York State League.
- The American yacht Columbia was selected over the Constitution to defend the America's Cup against the British yacht Shamrock II, beginning on September 21.
- On "President's Day" at the Pan-American Exposition, U.S. President William McKinley spoke on the way that modern communications technology had transformed the planet, remarking "After all, how near one to the other is every part of the world! Modern inventions have brought into close relation widely separated peoples and made them better acquainted." Looking toward the future, he commented "God and man have linked the nations together. No nation can longer be indifferent to any other." The speech, which was overshadowed by the events of the following day, "marked significant change in McKinley's policy toward free trade" as the U.S. president suggested an end to America's policy of isolationism in favor of reciprocal trade agreements negotiated by the United States in its new role as a major world power.
- Walter Hampden, who would become one of the most celebrated stage actors of his day, made his professional acting debut, in a production of Henry V at the Theatre Royal, Brighton, delivering three lines in portraying the Duke of Gloucester.

== September 6, 1901 (Friday) ==
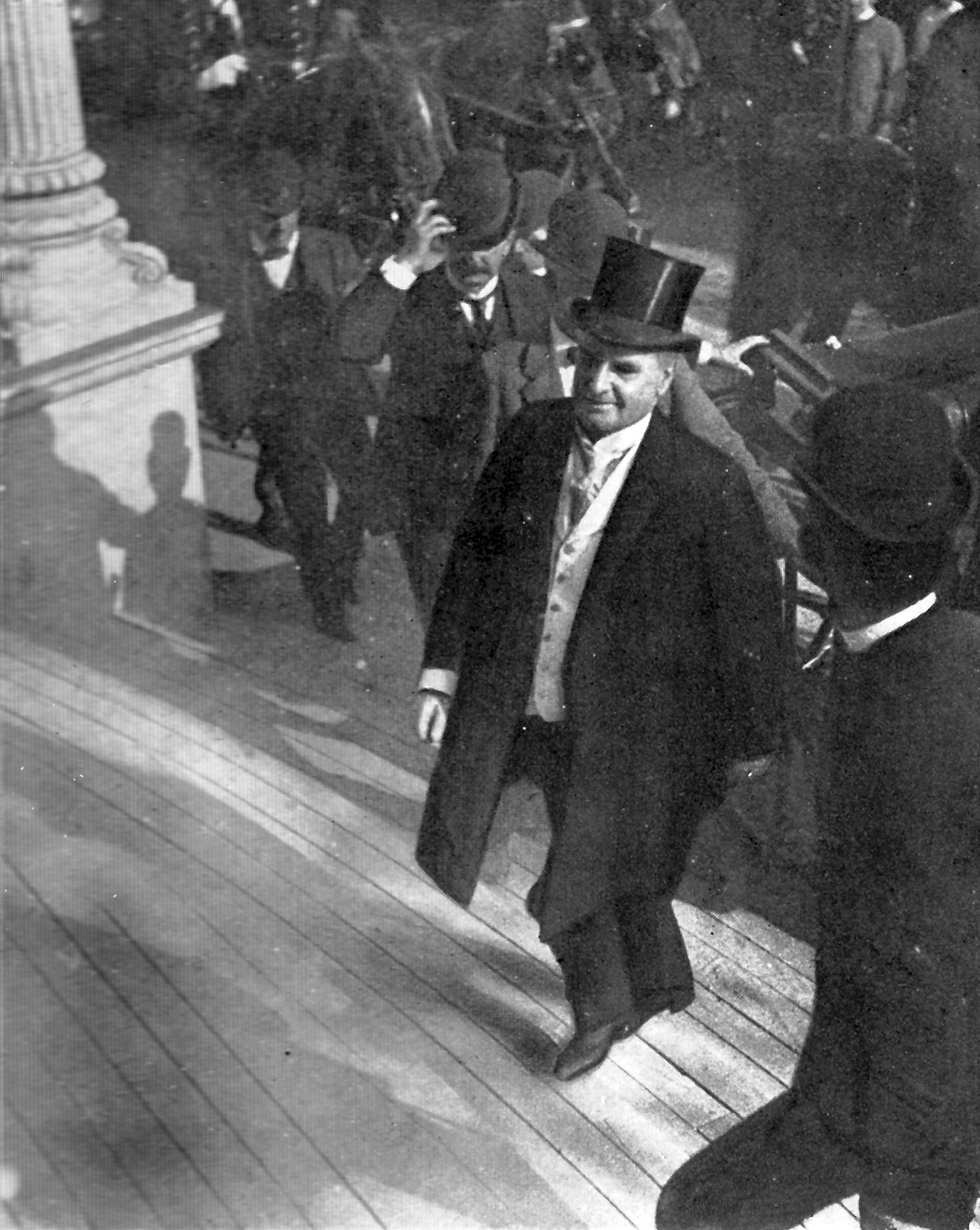
U.S. President William McKinley entering Temple of Music

- U.S. President William McKinley was shot and fatally wounded at 4:12 in the afternoon by Leon Czolgosz, an American anarchist who had been standing in line at the Pan-American Exposition in Buffalo, New York. McKinley would die from complications of his abdominal injury eight days later. Earlier in the day, he and Mrs. McKinley rode the inclined train to Niagara Falls (where he had an aide mark the midway point on the International Bridge so that he would not inadvertently cross from the United States into Canada), and he told of his plans to spend the following week in Cleveland with his friend, Senator Mark Hanna. At 3:30 the train brought him back to the Exposition fairgrounds, and he and his party rode by carriage to the Temple of Music for the scheduled public reception where 20,000 people were waiting in line to shake his hand. His Secret Service guard, Officer Ireland, stood opposite McKinley instead of by his side. As recounted later, the last people whom McKinley met were a woman and a little girl, "a tall, powerful negro" named Jim Parker, and a young man whose right hand was bound up tight in a handkerchief, Czolgosz. As McKinley extended his hand, Czolgosz fired two shots from a gun concealed beneath the bandage. James Benjamin Parker knocked Czolgosz down before a third shot could be fired and was initially applauded for saving the President's life. The President was transported to the first-aid station at the Exposition grounds 23 minutes after being shot, and at 5:30, the best available surgeon, obstetrician Dr. Matthew D. Mann of the University at Buffalo, began operating in poor lighting, but the bullet (which had passed through the walls of the President's stomach) could not be located. Dr. Mann patched the hole in McKinley's stomach, but stitched up the President without draining the wound. After the President awoke from surgery, he was transported to the home of John G. Milburn, the President of the Pan-American Exposition.
  - McKinley's personal secretary, George B. Cortelyou, had urged McKinley to cancel the event at the Temple of Music and had even removed it twice from the announced agenda, restoring it each time at the insistence of the President.
  - Vice President Theodore Roosevelt was at the home of former Vermont Lieutenant Governor Nelson W. Fisk on Isle La Motte, where a luncheon was being held for the Vermont Fish and Game League. Fisk received a phone call and brought the Vice President inside to hear the news from Buffalo.
  - Early news bulletins reported that President William McKinley had died at the scene, including one telegraphed at 4:30 p.m. local time that said, "The president died shortly after the shooting. Particulars later." and another that reported that "He died at 4:05 o'clock at the service hospital building."
- Ottoman Sultan Abdul Hamid II ordered the Muslim terrorists to release American missionary Ellen Stone, who had been kidnapped on August 21, but there was no compliance.

== September 7, 1901 (Saturday) ==
- The Boxer Rebellion in China was formally ended with the signing of the Boxer Protocol between Li Hongzhang and Yikuang (Prince Qing) for the Chinese Empire, and as representatives of 11 nations whose embassies had been besieged during the 1900 rebellion. There were 11 terms, including apologies to Germany and Japan for the murders of their diplomats, a monument to Baron von Ketteler, punishment of the rebels, reparations payable over a 39-year period, compensation to individual foreigners, a ban against importing weapons, fortification of the diplomatic quarter, the tearing down of the Taku Forts and installation of foreign military bases, a death penalty for creators of anti-foreign organizations, and the end of the Chinese practice of the kowtow, the deep bowing that offended many of the foreign representatives.
- The Venezuelan Navy bombarded the port of Rio Hacha in Colombia.
- Dr. Ramón Barros Luco was appointed as the President of Chile.
- Maude Willard attempted to become the first person to successfully go over Niagara Falls in a barrel, but did not survive the trip because she took along her pet dog "but was unmindful of the fact that the air in the barrel was insufficient for the two to live on any length of time." It was speculated that the dog, terrified by being sealed in the barrel, pressed its nose against the only air hole.
- Died: Johann Ludwig Wilhelm Thudichum, 82, German-British physician who pioneered the study of brain chemistry (b. 1829)

== September 8, 1901 (Sunday) ==
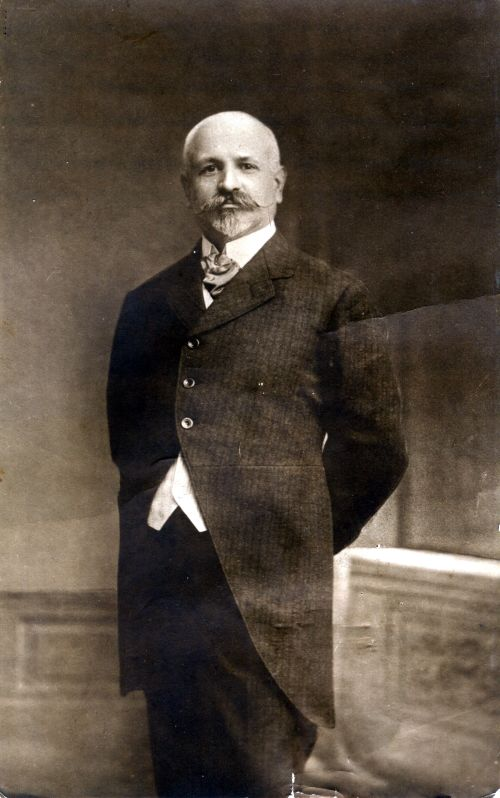
Ferrer

- Spanish educator and anarchist Francisco Ferrer founded the Modern School movement by opening the first school embodying his philosophy, the Escuela Moderna, in Barcelona. The new school was opened with a sizable donation from a former pupil, Ernestine Meunie, and the first class had 30 pupils (18 boys and 12 girls) from a variety of social groups. Among the innovations was the teaching of boys and girls together, a departure from the norms in Spain, and Ferrer emphasized practical education with "as much firsthand experience as possible, rather than the 'wearisome' practice of getting knowledge from books." In the second year, there were 70 pupils, and by the fifth year, 126. After Ferrer's execution in 1909, the Modern School movement would spread to the United States and other nations.
- The ill-fated Russian Navy battleship Borodino was launched from the New Admiralty shipyard at Saint Petersburg. On May 27, 1905, during the Battle of Tsushima against the Imperial Japanese Army, the Borodino would be sunk in the Pacific Ocean, losing all but one of its crew of 855.
- U.S. President William McKinley's secretary, George B. Cortelyou, and his physicians, Dr. Herman Mynter and Dr. Rixey, began issuing regular statements of the President's vital signs to the national press, starting with the report that at 3:20 in the morning, his temperature was 102.4°, pulse 122 and respiration 24.
- Born: Hendrik Verwoerd, Dutch-born Prime Minister of South Africa and apartheid advocate, from 1958 until his assassination in 1966; in Amsterdam
- Died: Johannes von Miquel, 72, German Minister of Finance from 1890 to 1901 (b. 1828)

== September 9, 1901 (Monday) ==
- The Ottoman Empire and the British Empire signed a preliminary agreement that ended their conflict over the Emirate of Kuwait, located between the Turkish-controlled Basra Province (now part of Iraq) and the Turkish-ruled territory in what is now Saudi Arabia. The two Empires agreed that Turkey would respect the British use of Kuwait as long as the Britons did not attempt to annex Kuwait as a colony nor establish a protectorate over it.
- Born:
  - James Blades, English percussionist; in Peterborough, Northamptonshire (d. 1999)
  - Louise Thompson Patterson, African-American social activist; in Chicago (d. 1999)
  - Granville Hicks, American Marxist activist; in Exeter, New Hampshire (d. 1982)
- Died: Henri de Toulouse-Lautrec, 36, French Post-Impressionist painter, died of complications of syphilis and alcoholism (b. 1864)

== September 10, 1901 (Tuesday) ==
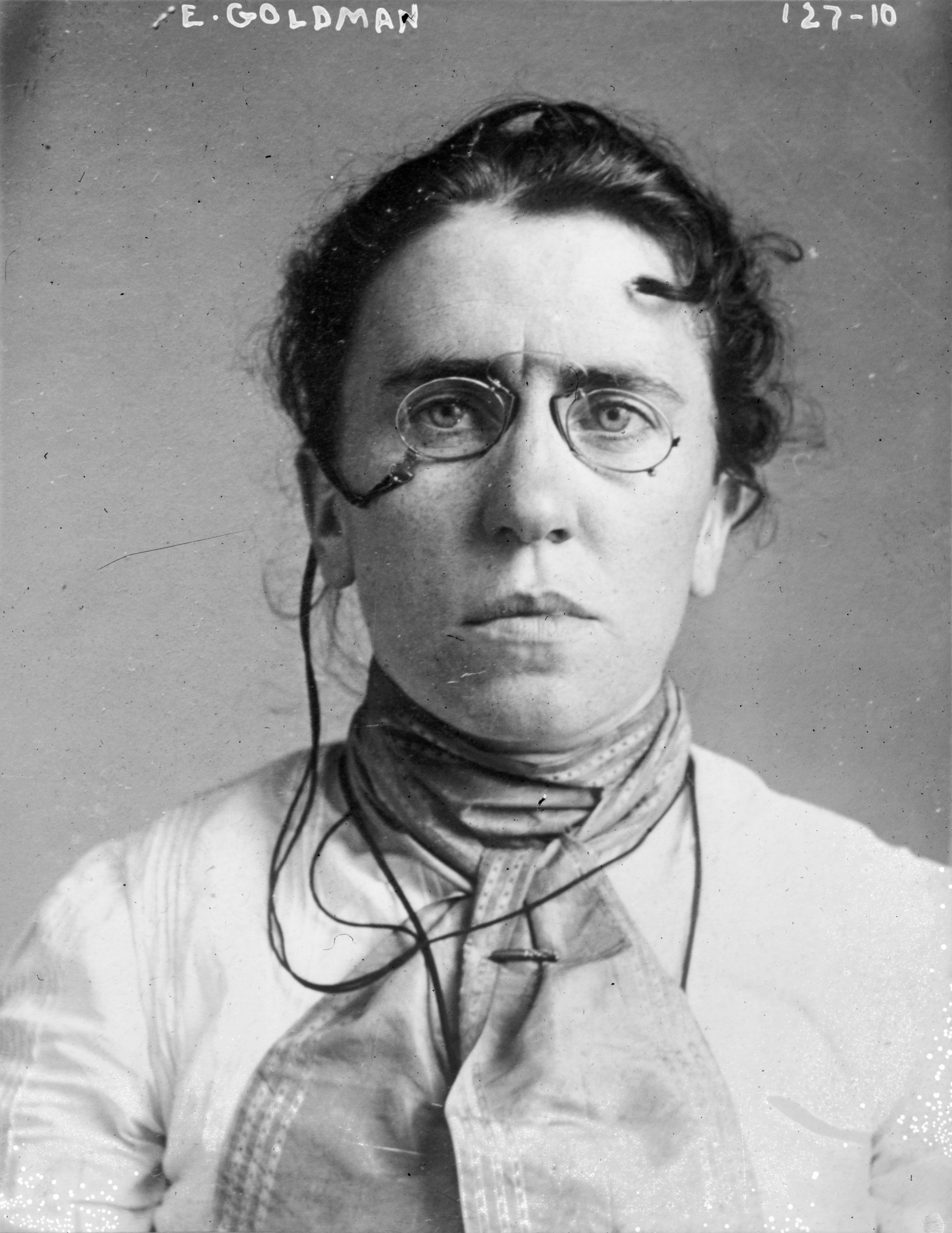
Emma Goldman

- Emma Goldman and other anarchists were arrested in a nationwide roundup of suspected terrorists after presidential assassin Leon Czolgosz told investigators that he had been inspired by Goldman, and had met her in Cleveland two months earlier. Goldman, who had been in hiding, was arrested in a Chicago apartment. After initially denying her identity to police, "she acknowledged that she was anarchy's high priestess" and went to City Hall for interrogation. Regarding McKinley, she reportedly said, "I consider him too insignificant a man for the purpose of assassination." Goldman remained in jail until September 23 and then was released after prosecutors in Chicago announced that there was no evidence against them.
- The monarchs of the United Kingdom, Russia, Greece and Denmark, along with 30 other members of royalty, rode together on a train from Fredensborg to Copenhagen as Tsar Nicholas completed his visit to Denmark. Present at the Tsar's farewell luncheon on board the Russian imperial yacht Standari were Denmark's King Christian, King George of Greece, and Britain's King Edward, who had arrived at Helsingør the day before on his yacht, HMY Osborne.
- Dr. Charles McBurney, leader of the team of doctors overseeing President William McKinley's recovery, announced that the President's condition had improved to the point that he could begin to consume liquid nourishment, starting with beef broth. Accordingly, newspapers reported the next day that "There is not the slightest doubt that President McKinley has made a wonderful step toward recovery, and danger to his life seems to have disappeared." Vice President Theodore Roosevelt and several members of the presidential cabinet departed Buffalo, New York and it was speculated that McKinley would be able to return to his duties by October 1. At 9:00 in the morning, McKinley's fever had broken and his temperature was 99.8°. The announcement came after the second day of good news from Buffalo.
- U.S. Treasury Secretary Lyman J. Gage announced that his cabinet department would buy back $20,000,000 worth of United States Bonds in order to put some of the surplus budget money back into circulation.
- The Lowie Museum of Anthropology (now the Phoebe A. Hearst Museum of Anthropology) was founded by vote of the University of California Board of Regents in Berkeley.
- Born: Ho Feng-Shan, Chinese diplomat who issued exit visas to thousands of Jews in Austria from 1938 to 1940 after the 1938 Nazi German annexation; in Yiyang, Hunan province (d. 1997)

== September 11, 1901 (Wednesday) ==
- Plans were made across the United States to celebrate U.S. President William McKinley's recovery from the assassination attempt of five days earlier. The Director-General of the Pan-American Exposition announced plans for "a day of special thanksgiving, a day of national jubilee over the escape of President McKinley from death" and said that provisional arrangements were being made for a series of events for September 21. Clergymen attending a national conference in Chicago agreed that the idea of a second Thanksgiving Day would be appropriate for 1901.
- President William McKinley's physicians provided the most encouraging news bulletin released after he had been shot five days earlier, as Dr. Herman Mynter told reporters, "Good news, good news, nothing but good news. We have washed and fed the President, and moved him to another bed." Asked if McKinley was still improving, Dr. Mynter said, "He is; and to prove it I desire to say that a count of his blood shows that it is in a normal condition, and we feel that we can announce definitely that there is not the least indication of blood poisoning."
- Kaiser Wilhelm of Germany and Tsar Nicholas of Russia met on the Kaiser's personal yacht, SMY Hohenzollern, which made a rendezvous with the Tsar's yacht, the Standart, on the Baltic Sea, with both anchored beyond sight of the German coast. Count Plateau, the Kaiser's aide, went on board the Standart and escorted the Russian Emperor over to the Hohenzollern. The two monarchs then went to the quarterdeck, engaged "in animated conversation", then ate together at a luncheon that included Russian Foreign Minister Vladimir Lamsdorf and German Chancellor Bernhard von Bülow. The New York Tribune would write that "As a result of the meeting between the Czar and the Kaiser one feels confident that the peace of Europe is assured as long as the Czar lives."
- The U.S. Circuit Court for New York ordered a refund of $490,139.09 from the federal government to the American Sugar Refining Company for the improper charge of foreign import duties on sugar brought to the U.S. mainland from Puerto Rico, in accordance with the May 27 decision of the U.S. Supreme Court in one of the "Insular Cases".
- Born:
  - Theodore "Ted" Bates, American advertising executive who founded the agency Ted Bates, Inc.; in New Haven, Connecticut (d. 1972)
  - Alexander Brunschwig, American cancer specialist; in El Paso, Texas (d. 1969)

== September 12, 1901 (Thursday) ==
- New Zealand became the first nation to require the registration and regulation of nurses, with the passage of the Nurses Registration Act 1901.
- After being permitted to eat solid food in the morning, U.S. President William McKinley began to experience a steady decline in his recovery, and by 8:30 p.m., began to show signs of heart failure. By the next morning, it was clear that he was dying.
- Born:
  - Ben Blue, Canadian comedian and actor; in Montreal (d. 1975)
  - Shmuel Horowitz, Russian-born Israeli agronomist; in Minsk (d. 1999)
  - Wilhelm Meise, German ornithologist, in Essen (d. 2002)

== September 13, 1901 (Friday) ==
- With his health continuing to worsen, President William McKinley spoke for the last time to his wife, and at 8:00 in the evening, uttered his last words, which Dr. Matthew D. Mann wrote down as "Goodbye, all. Goodbye. It is God's way. His will be done." According to Mrs. McKinley, however, her husband drew her close and whispered the words to his favorite hymn, "Nearer, My God, to Thee". Afterward, he was unconscious and never woke up.
- Earlier in the day, Vice President Theodore Roosevelt had been camping in the Adirondack Mountains in upstate New York, and had traveled with a group to the summit of Mount Marcy, the highest point in the state. Shortly before noon, two telegrams were brought to a lodge at Tahawus, New York, near the mountains. Harrison Hall, a 50-year old mountain guide, was given the task of locating the Vice President and bringing him back down. After more than three hours and a hike of 14 miles, Hall found Roosevelt near the summit by the shore of Lake Tear of the Clouds. The second of the two bulletins from Roosevelt's secretary, William Loeb Jr., said, "The President is critically ill. His condition is grave. Oxygen is being given. Absolutely no hope." Arriving at Tahawus, Roosevelt got a third telegram that said "The President appears to be dying and members of the Cabinet in Buffalo think you should lose no time coming." Deciding to rest rather than departing the Adirondacks in the dark, Roosevelt went to bed at 9:00.

== September 14, 1901 (Saturday) ==
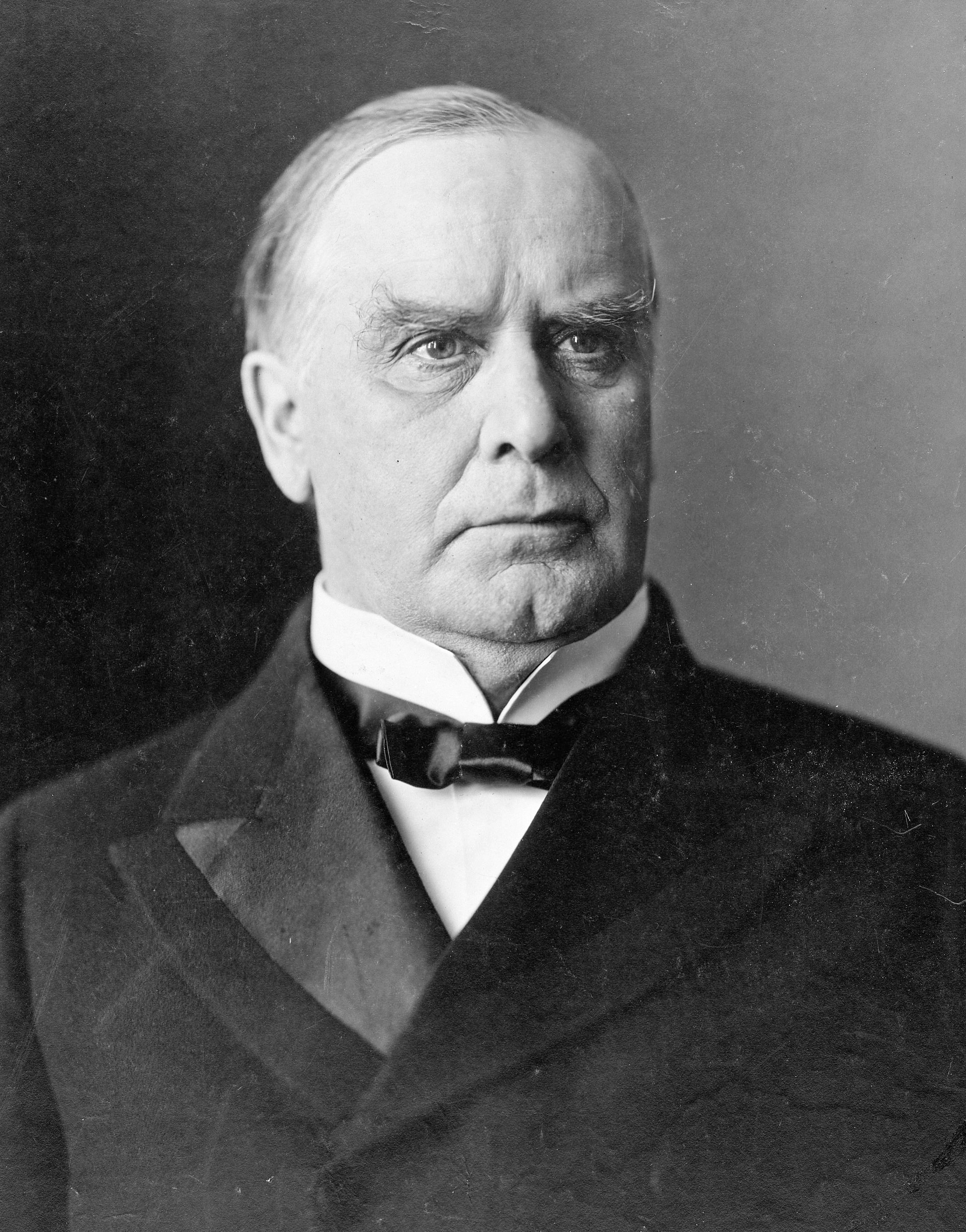
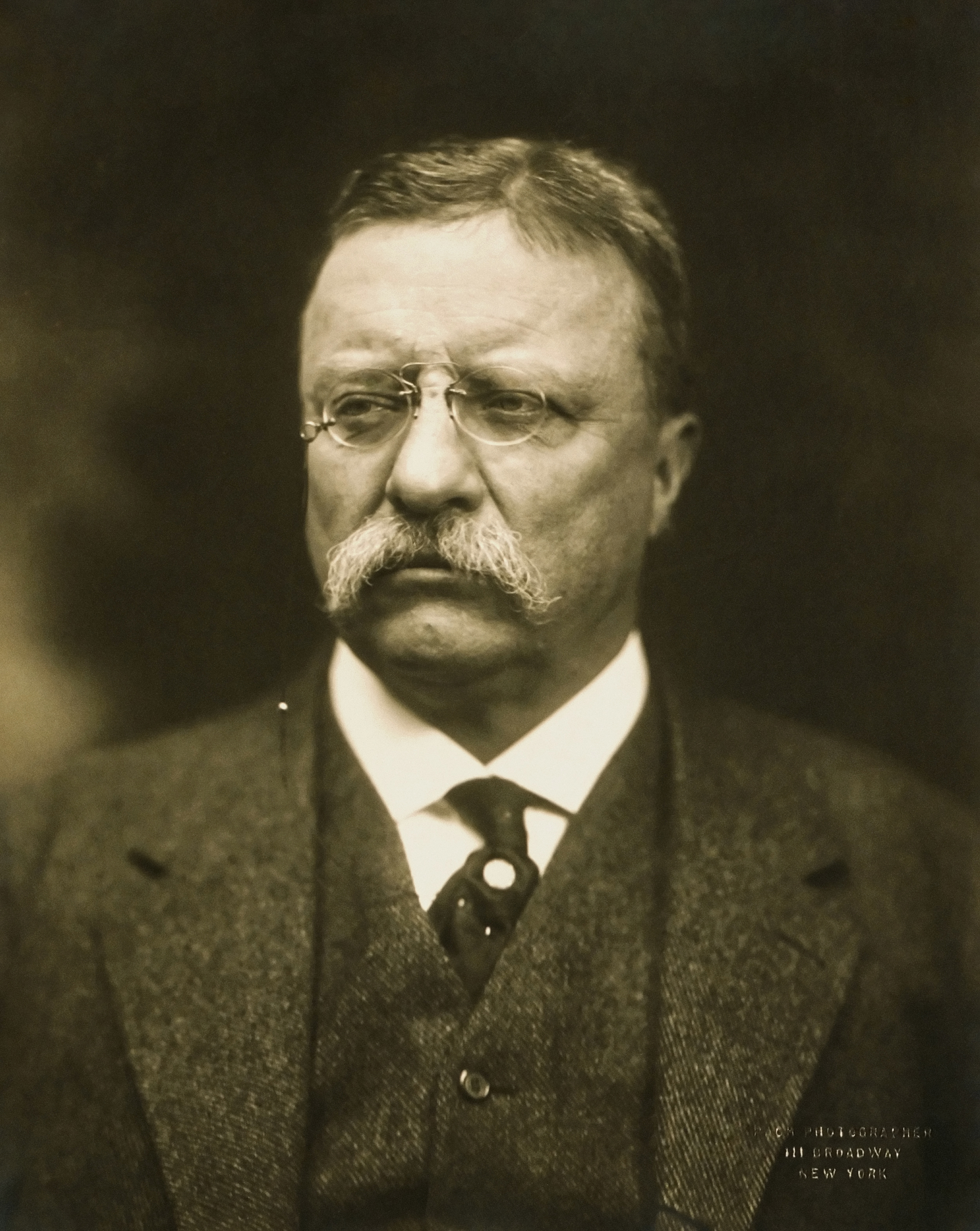
McKinley and Roosevelt
- William McKinley, 58, the 25th President of the United States, died of gangrene poisoning from his injuries at 2:15 in the morning, at the home of his friend John G. Milburn, at 1168 Delaware Avenue in Buffalo, New York. All of the members of his Cabinet, with the exception of the Secretary of State and the Secretary of the Treasury, were present when he died. The postmortem report listed the cause of death as "Gangrene of both walls of stomach and pancreas following the gunshot wound."
- In a remote area of New York state, Vice President Theodore Roosevelt had been woken up shortly after midnight with two more telegrams and, at 12:30 in the morning, rode on a horse-drawn buckboard wagon driven by David Hunter, the superintendent of the Tarawas Club, ten miles downhill toward the nearest telephone, in the lower clubhouse, and called the railroad station at North Creek, New York, where Mr. Loeb was waiting, and departed on the second leg of his journey at 2:10 in the morning in a wagon driven by Orrin Kellogg. "They had not made ten strides," a reporter would write later, before Theodore Roosevelt became President of the United States by the death of William McKinley. A third driver, Mike Cronin, met him at the Alden Lair Lodge at 3:05 and took him on the dangerous road on the 16 mile trip to North Creek, arriving at 4:48, where Roosevelt was informed (by William Loeb) that he was now the President. They boarded the special train to Albany and then to Buffalo. The train arrived at Buffalo by 2:00 in the afternoon and, after offering his condolences to McKinley's family, Roosevelt went to the home of his friend, Ansley Wilcox, at 641 Delaware Avenue, where he was sworn in as the 26th President of the United States by U.S. District Judge John R. Hazel at 3:25. At the age of 42, Roosevelt became the youngest man to ever serve as the U.S. president.
- In China, the Imperial Court issued an edict directing that the academies in all of the Empire's provincial capitals were to be converted to colleges, and to offer both Confucian studies and a Western-world education.
- What is believed to have been the first bodybuilding competition in history was presented by German athlete Eugen Sandow, before 15,000 people at Royal Albert Hall in London. The "Great Competition" was judged by Sandow, Sir Arthur Conan Doyle, and Sir Charles Bennett Lawes.

== September 15, 1901 (Sunday) ==
- Memorial services were observed across the United States for President William McKinley and at the home of John G. Milburn, with President Theodore Roosevelt, members of the cabinet, and McKinley's friends and family present. After the service, McKinley's body was transported to the City Hall in Buffalo, New York, to lie in state while mourners paid their respects.
- Born:
  - Donald Bailey, British civil engineer who invented the portable, pre-fabricated Bailey bridge used during World War II, in Rotherham, South Yorkshire (d. 1985)
  - Ernst von Salomon, Nazi German novelist, in Kiel, Germany (d. 1972)
- Died: Edith Simcox, 57, British feminist author (b. 1844)

== September 16, 1901 (Monday) ==
- The Duke of Cornwall and York, heir-apparent of the United Kingdom and the future King George V, arrived in Canada to make a five-week cross-country tour of the Dominion and its provinces, as his yacht docked in Quebec City.
- The winning choice for the Flag of Australia was first raised, although the winning design would not be officially announced until February 18. At the opening of the new Town Hall in Townsville, Queensland, the Governor-General, Lord Hopetoun, presided as the banner created by Annie Dorrington was run up the flagpole.
- The Western Transit Company steamer Hudson foundered and sank in Lake Superior, drowning all 25 of its crew, in view of people on the beach at Eagle River, Michigan. A legend among local residents is that, on every September 16 since the disaster, "the ship's ghost rises from the bottom, only to sink once more."
- President Theodore Roosevelt and the cabinet members rode along with President William McKinley's casket on a train from Buffalo, New York, to Washington, D.C.
- Leon Czolgosz was indicted by the State of New York on murder charges for the assassination of President William McKinley. At the arraignment, he was assigned two former judges, Robert C. Titus and Lorain L. Lewis, who reluctantly agreed to represent him.
- William Henry Hunt was sworn in as the new American Governor of Puerto Rico. Elaborate ceremonies that had been planned for his inauguration were canceled in light of the death of President William McKinley, and Hunt was sworn into office with a simple oath. Afterward, he discarded his prepared inaugural address and delivered a brief eulogy for McKinley.
- The city of Tonka Bay, Minnesota, a resort named for nearby Lake Minnetonka, was incorporated. Tonka itself is the Sioux Indian language word for "large".
- Born: M. N. Kaul (Maheshwar Nath Kaul), Secretary-General of the Lok Sabha, the lower house of the Parliament of India, during its first 12 years (1952–1964); in Srinagar, Jammu and Kashmir princely state, British India (d. 1984)
- Died: Henry Benjamin Whipple, 79, Episcopal bishop in Minnesota, humanitarian, and advocate for the state's American Indian residents who were members of the Dakota Sioux and Ojibwe tribes (b. 1822)

== September 17, 1901 (Tuesday) ==
- Lieutenant Colonel Hubert Gough of the British Army underestimated his enemy, and led his 280-man Mounted Infantry force in a surprise attack on what he thought was a contingent of no more than 200 Boer soldiers, in the Battle of Blood River Poort. Without waiting to scout the area, Gough and his cavalrymen charged on horseback on a 1,000-yard (910 m) dash, and discovered that they had charged into the middle of a much larger Boer encampment. The 200 Boers that Gough had sighted began firing, and "500 enemy horsemen galloped out to Gough's right flank from which, almost at once, they began to envelop him." After a 20-minute battle, 23 of Gough's men were dead, 24 more wounded, and he and the remaining 235 were captured, along with two cannons, 180 rifles, 30,000 rounds of ammunition and 200 ponies. Gough and his men escaped or were disarmed and released over the next few days.
- Plans by Guglielmo Marconi to send the first wireless transmission from Europe to North America were dealt a setback when a powerful storm wrecked the nearly-completed antenna array at his transmitting station at Poldhu, located in the westernmost area of Great Britain at Cornwall. As he was making repairs at Poldhu, a gale would take down his North American receiving station at Cape Cod, Massachusetts, on November 26. He would be able to rebuild before the end of the year, and the first trans-Atlantic wireless transmission would happen on December 12.
- Hundreds of mourners were trampled, and several hospitalized, after the doors to the United States Capitol rotunda opened to admit people who had gathered in Washington, D.C., to pay their last respects to President William McKinley. The poorly controlled crowd of 40,000 people had been waiting outside the Capitol, and when the mass pushed forward, a panic set in. Those who had the misfortune of falling down were stepped upon "by those around them and by the horses of three mounted policemen". Nobody was killed, but "a number of persons sustained broken ribs and broken limbs" and many were taken to hospitals. In the evening, McKinley's body was placed on a special train back to be taken to his hometown of Canton, Ohio.
- Imperial Chinese troops returned to Beijing following the signing of the Boxer Protocol, and American and Japanese officers relinquished control of the Forbidden City quarter of China's capital.
- The Grand Canyon Railway delivered its first tourists to the Grand Canyon after departing from Williams, Arizona, at 7:00 in the morning with 30 passengers in a railroad car pulled by Locomotive 282 and driven by engineer Harry Schlee. The trip covered the 60-mile distance in three hours each way, but the $3.95 ticket for the round trip (equivalent to $106 in 2016) "was a bargain by comparison with the day-long $20 stage trip" by horse-drawn coach.
- Russian author Leonid Andreyev became an instant success with the publication of his first book, a collection of ten short stories.
- Born: Francis Chichester, English yachtsman sailor and navigator who made a solo trip around the world by sailboat in 1966 and 1967 in the Gipsy Moth IV; in Barnstaple, Devonshire (d. 1972)

== September 18, 1901 (Wednesday) ==
- The British torpedo boat HMS Cobra foundered in a storm and sank off the coast of Lincolnshire, drowning 67 of the 79 people on board. The Cobra was the second steam turbine propulsion ship to be wrecked in seven weeks; its sister vessel, HMS Viper, had been ruined beyond repair on August 3, but without loss of life. Although the new steam turbine technology was not found to be at fault in either disaster, the Royal Navy court-martial that tried the case against the survivors concluded that "the loss of the ship was due to structural weakness, and expressed regret that she was ever purchased for His Majesty's Fleet."
- Princeton University inaugurated its first graduate school, offering the master's degree program to students who had already obtained a bachelor's degree.
- Venezuelan troops occupied the Colombian city of Rio Hacha.
- The body of President William McKinley lay in state a third time, as mourners passed by it in Canton, Ohio.

== September 19, 1901 (Thursday) ==
- A final funeral service for President William McKinley was held in Canton, Ohio, during a day of national mourning, with business suspended throughout the United States. Memorial services were observed in the principal cities of the world. Present in Canton were the entire presidential cabinet, 67 U.S. Representatives and 30 U.S. Senators. Schools and many businesses were closed, and those businesses that continued to operate paused in the afternoon. At 3:30 p.m. Eastern Time (12:30 Pacific), church bells were tolled to coincide with the end of the funeral service in Canton, and people stopped what they were doing for five minutes, as streetcars and trains came to a stop, factories halted work, horse-drawn and motor vehicles paused in the streets. At the end of five minutes, the bells were rung again and work was resumed. The exception was the city of Boston, which "did not interrupt its customary traffic and holiday avocations". Nearly all sporting events were canceled, except for some scheduled races in Indiana.
- Leon Czolgosz consented to an interview with Frank A. Olozanowski, editor of a Buffalo newspaper read by the Polish-American community. Olozanowski would tell reporters later that the assassin "talked freely on every subject which I suggested, except his crime." Asked about the assassination, Czolgosz said, "What's the use of talking about that? I killed the President. I am an anarchist and simply did my duty, that's all I'll say."
- Born:
  - Ludwig von Bertalanffy, Austrian biologist and a founder of general systems theory; in Atzgersdorf, Austria-Hungary (d. 1972)
  - Clyde Connell, American abstract expressionist sculptor; near Belcher, Louisiana (d. 1998)

== September 20, 1901 (Friday) ==
- The 1,000th anniversary of the rule of King Alfred the Great of England was celebrated with the unveiling of a statue in his honor by Lord Roseberry at Winchester. "King Alfred wrought immortal work for us and our sister nation over the sea," Roseberry said, "which, in the supreme moment of stress and sorrow, is irresistibly joined to us across the centuries and across the seas." King Alfred's reign had actually ended with his death on October 26, 899, but a government committee relied on the traditional date from the Anglo-Saxon Chronicle of 900 AD, and chose to make the celebration from November 1900 to the end of October 1901. This came despite the dating discrepancies pointed out by historian W. H. Stevenson in 1898; the chroniclers "began the new year in September" starting with entries for the middle of the 9th century.
- Theodore Roosevelt held his first cabinet meeting as President of the United States and pledged to continue the policies of the McKinley administration.

== September 21, 1901 (Saturday) ==
- Anton Chekhov's play, Three Sisters (Tri sestry) was performed for the first time, making its debut at the Moscow Art Theatre.
- W. Scott Heywood began the first drilling for oil in the U.S. state of Louisiana, placing a well in Jefferson Davis Parish on the farm of Jules Clement, five miles north of the town of Jennings. Oil production and refining would soon become the most important part of the Louisiana economy.
- The Chicago White Stockings clinched the American League pennant despite a 10–4 loss to the fourth-place Philadelphia Athletics, because the trailing Boston Americans fell to Detroit, 3–1. The loss at home put Boston 8 1/2 games behind Chicago, which had won the 1900 title when the AL was a minor league, with only 8 games to play.
- The legislature of Argentina voted to require compulsory military service.
- The Chicago Orphans, later the Cubs, defeated the Boston Beaneaters, 1–0, in 17 innings, the longest major league baseball game since August 18, 1882, when the Providence Grays beat the Detroit Wolverines by the same score in 18 innings.
- Born:
  - Learie Constantine, Trinidad-born cricket star for the West Indies, Trinidad High Commissioner, and (as Baron Constantine) the first black member of the British House of Lords; in Diego Martin, Trinidad and Tobago (d. 1971)
  - Lee Alvin DuBridge, American physicist who served as the president of Caltech from 1946 to 1969; in Terre Haute, Indiana (d. 1994)

== September 22, 1901 (Sunday) ==
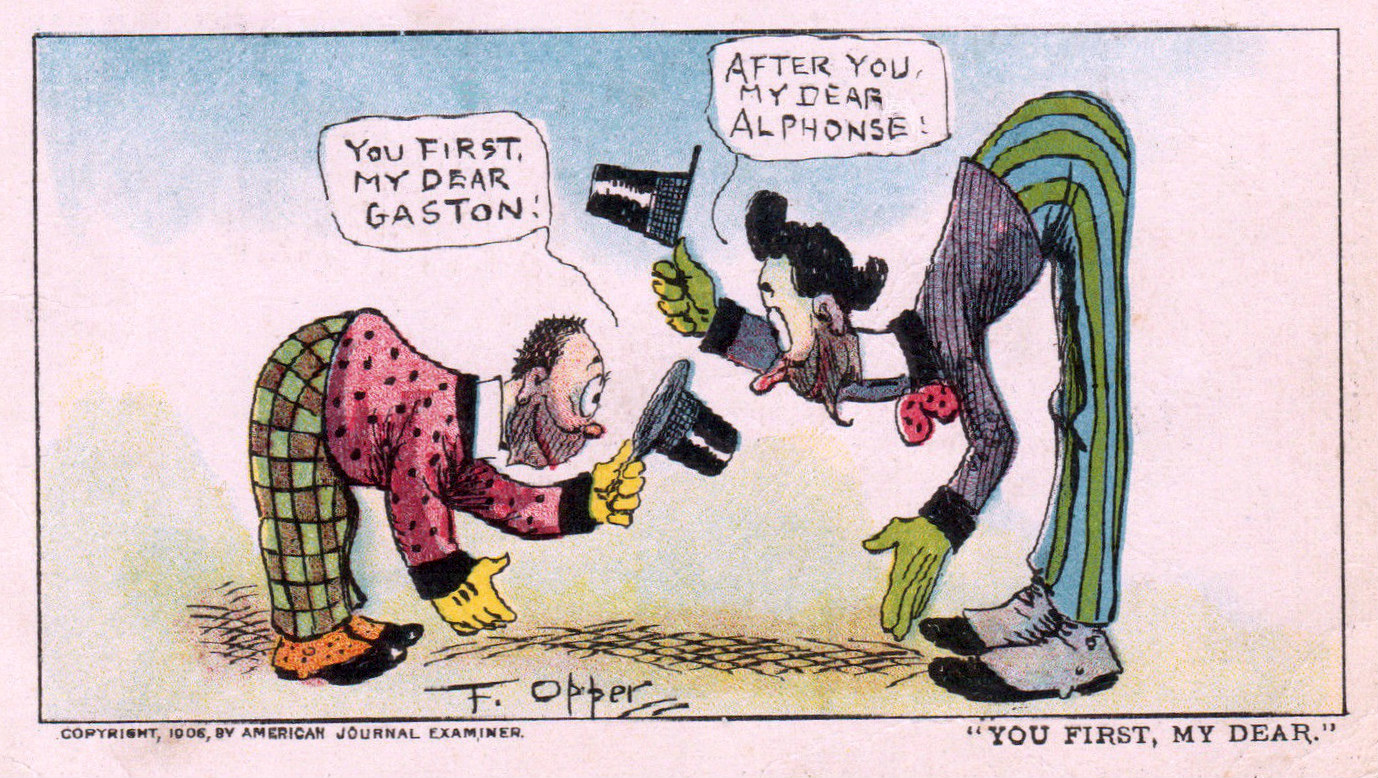
Alphonse and Gaston

- The comic strip "Alphonse and Gaston" made its debut, creating the catchphrase "After you, my dear Alphonse" to express the idea of letting somebody else do something first, and the "Alphonse-and-Gaston routine", where neither side will do anything constructive until the other one acts first. Created by Frederick Burr Opper for the Sunday New York Journal, the feature was based on the premise of two exceedingly polite Frenchmen.
- District Attorney Thomas Penney, leading the prosecution in the Czolgosz murder trial, announced in Buffalo, New York, that forensic tests had ruled out the theory that poisoned bullets had been used in the shooting of President William McKinley. The President's death from gangrene of the stomach had been the result of improper care of the wound, rather than a contaminant used by the assassin.
- Born:
  - Charles Brenton Huggins, Canadian-born cancer researcher, recipient of the 1966 Nobel Prize in Physiology or Medicine; in Halifax, Nova Scotia (d. 1997)
  - Nadezhda Alliluyeva, second wife of Joseph Stalin; in Baku (committed suicide, 1932)

== September 23, 1901 (Monday) ==
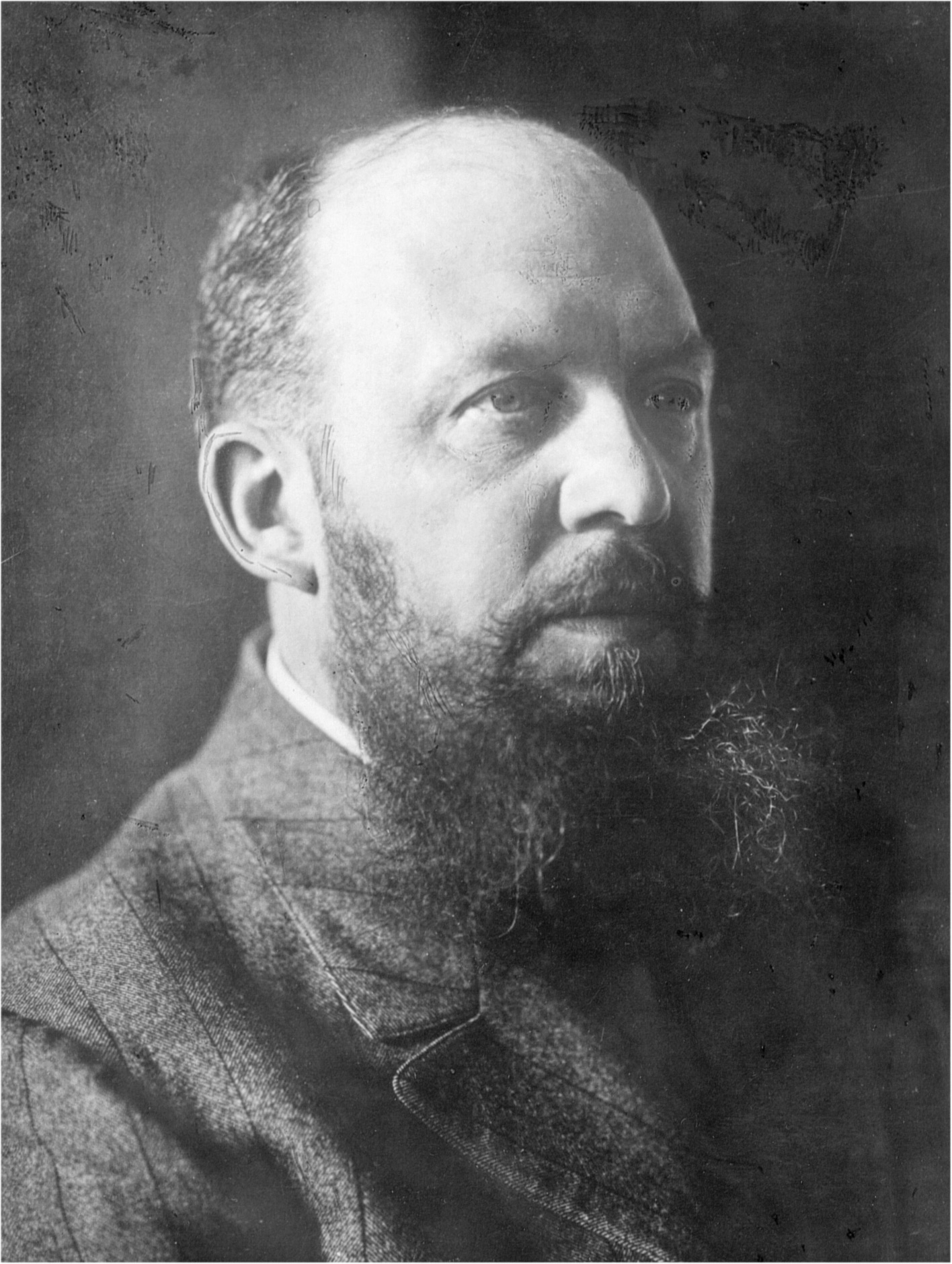
Dr. Kelling

- German gastroenterologist Georg Kelling introduced the minimally invasive diagnostic surgery and gave the first public demonstration of a modern laparoscopic procedure. Dr. Kelling appeared before a conference of naturalist scientists in Hamburg and, operating upon the abdomen of a live dog, combined two relatively new technologies. With two small incisions, he placed a cystoscope through one side to view the abdominal cavity, and a trocar from another side to blow filtered air to insufflate the cavity without damaging the dog's internal organs.
- President Theodore Roosevelt took up residence at the White House, eight days after President William McKinley's death and the shipment of the last of the McKinley family belongings back to Ohio. On his first evening, he invited his two sisters, Anna Roosevelt Cowles and Corinne Roosevelt Robinson, along with their husbands, to dine with him in celebration of the 70th birthday of their father, the late Theodore Roosevelt Sr., who had died in 1878.
- The murder trial of Leon Czolgosz began at 10:00 in the morning in Buffalo, New York, six days after his arraignment for the McKinley assassination. Testimony did not begin until 3:00, after a panel of 12 jurors was selected, and the first witness was former city engineer Samuel J. Fields, who presented a diagram of the Temple of Music and showed the position of the President. Four others testified before Judge Truman White adjourned court at 4:03.
- The Auctioneer, a three-act comedy written by Charles Klein and produced by David Belasco, premiered at the Bijou Theatre in Manhattan. Actor David Warfield performed what would become his signature role, as suddenly wealthy auctioneer Simon Levi.
- Emma Goldman and eight other anarchists in Chicago were released from jail after the city prosecutor admitted that no evidence had been found linking them to the McKinley assassination. They had been incarcerated since September 10 on charges of conspiracy.
- Born:
  - Jaroslav Seifert, Czech writer, and 1984 Nobel Prize laureate; in Žižkov, Austria-Hungary (now in the Czech Republic) (d. 1986)
  - Ruth Andreas-Friedrich, German social worker and partner with Leo Borchard in a covert campaign to rescue Jews from persecution; in Berlin. After her suicide in 1977, she would be posthumously named as one of the Righteous Among the Nations in Israel.
- Died:
  - Nathaniel Buchanan, 75, Irish-born pioneer of the Australian outback during the 19th century (b. 1826)
  - Doc McJames (Dr. James McCutchen James), 27, American major league baseball pitcher and physician who had appeared in a game for Brooklyn as recently as July 13, died of complications from injuries in a horse-drawn carriage accident (b. 1874)

== September 24, 1901 (Tuesday) ==
- Following a trial and deliberation that lasted a total of 8 hours and 26 minutes, Leon Czolgosz was found guilty of the murder of President William McKinley. The appointed defense attorneys called no witnesses, and Czolgosz refused to cooperate with them. At 3:52 p.m., the jury retired for deliberations, and the announcement that they had reached a verdict came 28 minutes later. Jury foreman Henry W. Wendt announced the verdict at 4:26. Two days later, Czolgosz would be sentenced to die in the electric chair, with the execution scheduled for the week of October 28.
- Born:
  - Joseph Schmid, German commander of the Luftwaffe intelligence branch during World War II; in Göggingen (d. 1956)
  - Gerald Warner Brace, American novelist who wrote about New England rural life; in Islip, New York (d. 1978)
  - John Faulkner, American novelist who wrote about Southern rural life; in Ripley, Mississippi (d. 1963)
- Died: John Logan Power, 67, Irish-born American journalist, Confederate government official, and Secretary of State of Mississippi since 1895

== September 25, 1901 (Wednesday) ==
- King Edward returned to the United Kingdom after more than a month away on a tour of the other European nations.
- An international college track and field competition was held, pitting Harvard and Yale of the United States against Oxford and Cambridge in the United Kingdom, and the American team won six of the nine events.
- During the war games of the United States Navy's North Atlantic squadron, the submarine USS Holland gave a dramatic demonstration of the vulnerability of surface ships to an underwater vessel. With his crew, U.S. Navy Lieutenant H. H. Caldwell, the first American submarine commander, guided the Holland past a simulated blockade of Rhode Island's Narragansett Bay, moved unobserved up to within 100 yards (91 m) of the lead battleship, the USS Kearsarge (even after flashing a warning signal), and made a simulated attack. When the sub surfaced, Lt. Caldwell climbed up to the conning tower, turned on a light and shouted "Hello Kearsarge, you are blown to atoms. This is the submarine boat, the Holland."
- Born:
  - Robert Bresson, French film director; in Puy-de-Dôme département; (d. 1999)
  - Gordon Coventry, Australian rules footballer, Hall of Famer and Victorian Football League scoring leader of the 1920s for the Collingwood Magpies, in Diamond Creek, Victoria (d. 1968)
- Died: Arthur Lyon Fremantle, 65, British military officer, Governor of Malta, and bestselling author who wrote contemporary accounts of his observations of the Confederate States Army during the American Civil War (b. 1835)

== September 26, 1901 (Thursday) ==
- The body of U.S. President Abraham Lincoln was re-interred beneath the Lincoln Tomb at the Oak Ridge Cemetery in Springfield, Illinois, after the remains had been properly identified. In order to protect against any future attempts at grave robbery, the tomb was protected by a layer of concrete that was several feet thick. Eighteen people were permitted to look at the body after Lincoln's casket was opened, and it was reported that the features were "extremely pallid... due to a film that has crept over the face", but that Lincoln's beard "could be plainly seen and the chin was prominent, while the hair had begun to fall out". Five of the 18 signed a statement saying that they had seen the remains the last time the casket had been opened (on April 14, 1887) and that "we again identify them as the same".
- A year after its victory over the Ashanti Empire in the War of the Golden Stool, the British government issued the Northern Territories Order in Council, declaring that "The territories in West Africa... heretofore known as Ashanti have been conquered by His Majesty's forces, and it has seemed expedient to His Majesty that the said territories should be annexed to and should henceforth form part of His Majesty's dominions." The area was administered by the Governor of the Gold Coast Colony and is now part of Ghana. In the Ashanti capital, Kumasi, a cannon was fired... at noon every day to remind its residents of Britain's occupation", while the sacred object of the war, the Golden Stool, remained hidden.
- Guglielmo Marconi secured a worldwide monopoly throughout the British Empire for his Wireless telegraphy system as the Marconi International Marine Communication Company signed a 14-year exclusive agreement with Lloyd's of London, which controlled most of the signaling of information to establish the location of merchant ships.
- Two days after being convicted of murder, Leon Czolgosz was informed that he would be executed in the electric chair at Auburn State Prison during the week of October 28. Czolgosz was reported to be terrified after showing no emotion during the trial; one of his defense attorneys, Judge Titus, asked the Court to allow Czolgosz the chance to make a statement, stating that "it seems to me, in order that the innocent should not suffer by this defendant's crime, the court should permit him to exculpate at least his father, brother and sisters." In a feeble voice, Czolgosz said, "There was no one else but me. No one else told me to do it, and no one paid me to do it. I was not told anything about that crime, and I never thought anything about murder until a couple of days before I committed the crime." At 2:26, Judge White told Czolgosz, "In taking the life of our beloved President you committed a crime which shocked and outraged the moral sense of the civilized world," and then signed the death warrant directing the state prison "to pass through the body of said Leon F. Czolgosz a current of electricity of sufficient intensity to cause death, and that the application of the said current of electricity be continued until he, the said Leon F. Czolgosz, be dead." Czolgosz was placed in a special railroad car at 9:45 that evening and sent to Auburn, New York.
- A report from South Africa was published, showing that 1,268 Boer civilians had died in British internment camps in the Transvaal, and 1,052 in those in the Orange River Colony. The overwhelming majority of the deaths were those of children.
- Born:
  - George Raft, American film actor; as George Ranft in New York City (d. 1980)
  - Ted Weems, American jazz musician bandleader; as Wilford Theodore Wemyes in Pitcairn, Pennsylvania (d. 1963)
  - Gordon McGregor, Canadian air ace for the RCAF and businessman who was the first president of Air Canada; in Montreal (d. 1971)
- Died: John George Nicolay, 70, private secretary and adviser to President Abraham Lincoln (b. 1832)

== September 27, 1901 (Friday) ==
- Escorted by Sheriff Samuel Caldwell and Jailer George M. Mitchell of Erie County, New York, and deputies of both officials, convicted assassin Leon Czolgosz arrived in Auburn, New York, at 3:13 in the morning and found an angry mob of several hundred people waiting for him outside the gates of the Auburn State Prison, across the street from the railroad station. "There was a mad rush for the prisoner as he was led from the car," a reporter for the New York Sun noted the next day. "The deputies were assailed on all sides. They drew their revolvers and billies and tried to drive back the crowd ... Blows were aimed at the murderer and Jailer Mitchell was struck twice in the abdomen." The officers finally got their captive through the prison gate, and Czolgosz "was led in, under a black bordered portrait of his victim which hung over the entrance" and placed in cell number five on the prison's Death Row.
- President Theodore Roosevelt's wife Edith, and six children (who ranged in age from 3 years old to 17), moved into the White House.
- The Pittsburgh Pirates clinched the National League pennant with eight games left to play, beating third-place Brooklyn 5–4, while second place Philadelphia Phillies lost in St. Louis, 9–0. The Pirates win gave them an 86–45 record, 9 1/2 games ahead of the 77–55 Phillies, who were mathematically eliminated even if they won all their remaining contests and Pittsburgh lost all of its last games. Hall of Famer Honus Wagner hit a single in the 8th inning that tied the game, 4–4, and then crossed the plate for the winning run.
- Born:
  - John Sung (Sung Shang-chieh), Chinese Christian evangelist who was influential in spreading the Christian religion in mainland China, Taiwan and much of Southeast Asia; in Fujian Province (d. 1944 of tuberculosis)
  - Roy Simmons Jr., American lacrosse player and coach, and National Lacrosse Hall of Fame member; in Philadelphia (d. 1994)
  - Jean Berger, German-American composer and pianist, as Arthur Schlossberg, in Hamm (now in North Rhine-Westphalia), Germany (d. 2002)
  - Beasley Smith, American composer and big band leader; in McEwen, Tennessee (d. 1968)
  - Gero von Schulze-Gaevernitz, German-born American intelligence officer who assisted Allen Dulles in the U.S. Office of Strategic Services during World War II, and assisted as negotiator; in Freiburg im Breisgau (d. 1971)

== September 28, 1901 (Saturday) ==
- Filipino guerrillas killed 48 members of Company C of the U.S. 9th Infantry Regiment, including Captain Thomas W. Connell and two other officers, in a surprise attack on the town of Balangiga on Samar Island, Philippines. Another 24 Americans, all but four of them injured, were able to flee to bring the news of the attack. In the week before the attack, Captain Connell had rounded up 143 male residents and forced them to clean up the town, following an altercation between two U.S. soldiers and the brothers of a local girl; Balangiga police chief Valeriano Abanador plotted revenge and was assisted by two guerrilla officers. The day before the attack, Private Adolph Gamlin told his superiors that the women and children were leaving town; at the same time, nearly 700 men, many of them dressed as women, were assembling in town with bolo knives and axes. At 6:45 on the morning of the 28th, while the men of Company C were unarmed and having breakfast, Chief Abanador grabbed Private Gamlin's rifle, then shouted the command to begin the ringing of church bells, the signal to start the assault. Nearly all of the dead infantrymen were hacked to death, and their bodies were mutilated. U.S. Army General Jacob H. Smith would order a brutal retaliation against the people of Samar over the next five months, and would eventually be convicted in a court-martial for directing a "kill and burn" policy.
- King C. Gillette incorporated the American Safety Razor Company, which would be renamed the Gillette Safety Razor Company in 1904, a year after manufacturing its first safety razor.
- A Royal Navy warship arrived at tiny (2.3 square miles (6.0 km^{2})) Banaba Island, raised the British flag, and announced to the locals that the reef had become part of the protectorate of the Gilbert and Ellice Islands.
- The Municipal Theater of Kiev began operations, with the performance of the opera A Life for the Tsar.
- Sir Joseph Dimsdale was elected Lord Mayor of London.
- Born:
  - William S. Paley, American businessman who presided over the transformation of the small (16 stations) CBS radio network into a television and radio broadcasting conglomerate; in Chicago (d. 1990)
  - Ed Sullivan, American newspaper columnist who created the longest running television variety show in American history, in Harlem, New York City (d. 1974)
  - Kurt Otto Friedrichs, German-born American mathematician; in Kiel (d. 1983)
- Died: J. H. Haverly, 80, American theater producer who entertained Americans in the 19th century with his innovative minstrel shows, and created the popular blackface troupe Haverly's United Mastodon Minstrels (b. 1837)

== September 29, 1901 (Sunday) ==
- An attempt to introduce automobiles into the sport of bullfighting proved to be "a grotesque fiasco" in the city of Baiona (Bayonne) in Spain, and "spectators were first amused by the scene, but afterward became enraged" when the car ran over one of the bull's hooves. The picadors, who normally rode on horseback, drove about in a 12-horsepower electric car that was protected by a steel cage, while the matador stood in the usual fashion.
- The vellum parchment pages of the Constitution of the United States document produced in 1787 were transferred from the U.S. Department of State offices on Pennsylvania Avenue, to the Library of Congress building on Independence Avenue. The three-mile distance was made by car in a U.S. mail wagon, and the steel case housing the document would be kept in a safe at the library until it could be safely placed on public display.
- President Theodore Roosevelt conferred with Booker T. Washington at the White House and outlined his plan on how he would improve the lives of African Americans. At the close of the meeting, Roosevelt invited Washington to dine with the First Family on October 16.
- Born:
  - Enrico Fermi, Italian theoretical atomic physicist, and 1938 Nobel Prize laureate; in the Castro Pretorio district of Rome (d. 1954)
  - Lanza del Vasto, Italian philosopher, poet and activist, in San Vito dei Normanni (d. 1981)

== September 30, 1901 (Monday) ==
- Twelve coal miners in Nanaimo, British Columbia, were killed after they went back into a burning coal mine to extinguish a fire that had been started by a pit lamp. They and the other members of the crew had safely escaped when flames had first been spotted in the number 2 mine.
- The U.S. Treasury issued a check for the pro-rated portion of President William McKinley's presidential salary, payable to the McKinley estate, in the amount of $1,856.88. The figure was based on the annual presidential salary of $50,000 which was paid at $4,166.66 for September, based on $12,500 per quarter and the extra penny paid for the third month of each quarter. Given that Theodore Roosevelt had been president for the last 17 days of September running from September 14 to September 30, the Auditor's office calculated that Roosevelt was due 17/92 of the $12,500 payable during the 92-day quarter ($2,309.79) and that McKinley would receive the remainder.
