= August 1901 =

Month in 1901

<<	August 1901					>>
Su	Mo	Tu	We	Th	Fr	Sa
				1	2	3
4	5	6	7	8	9	10
11	12	13	14	15	16	17
18	19	20	21	22	23	24
25	26	27	28	29	30	31

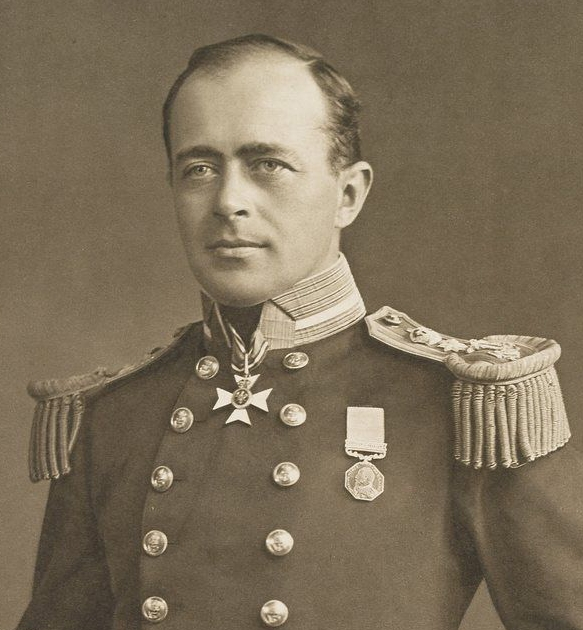
August 6, 1901: Scott leads RRS Discovery on the British Antarctic Expedition

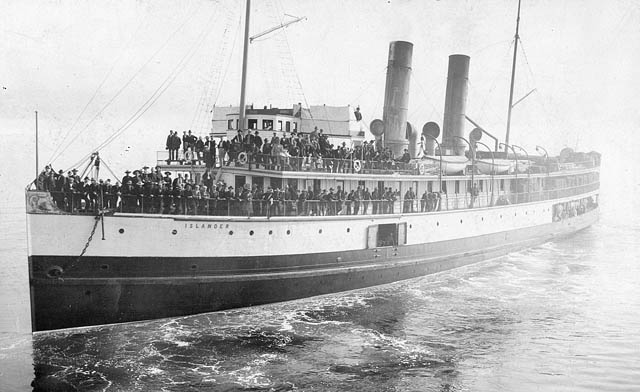
August 15, 1901: SS Islander sinks in Alaskan waters

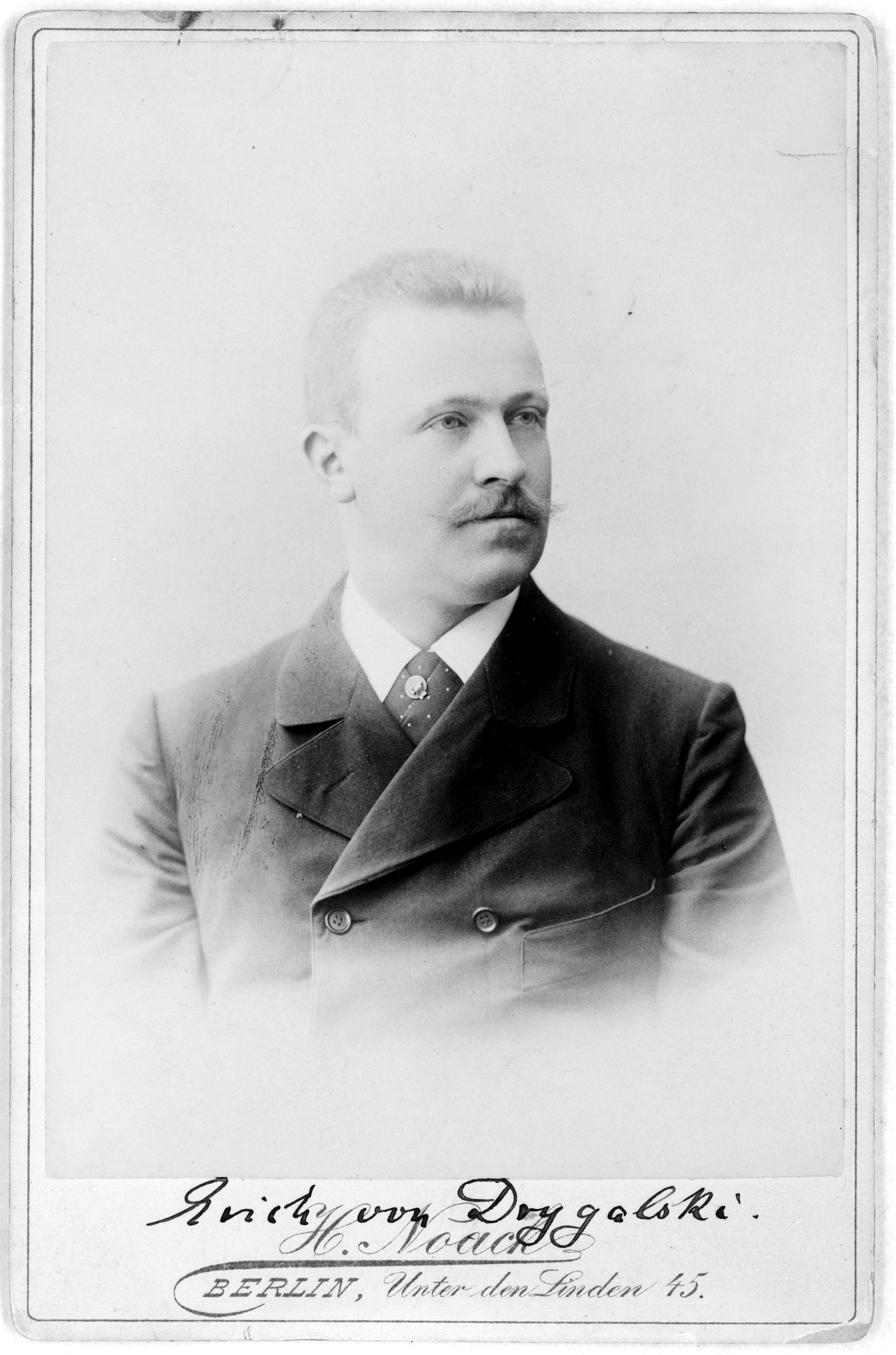
August 11, 1901: Drygalski leads the Gauss on the German Antarctic Expedition

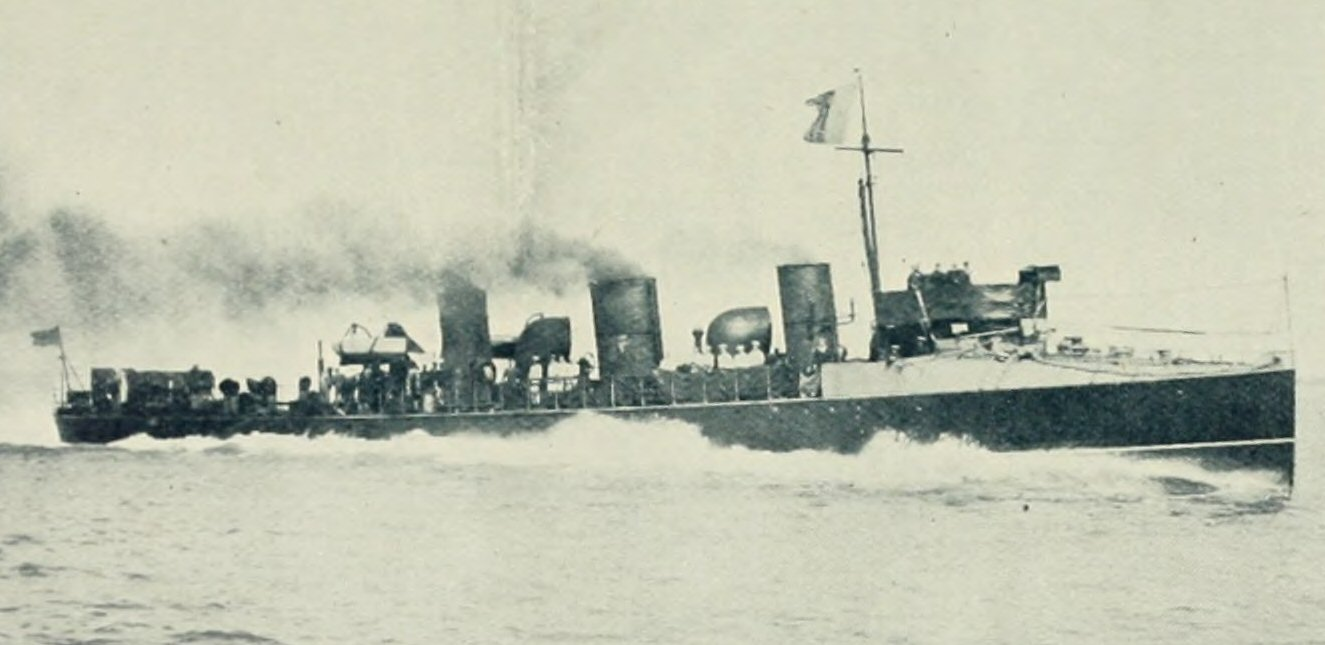
August 3, 1901: World's fastest ship, HMS Viper, wrecked

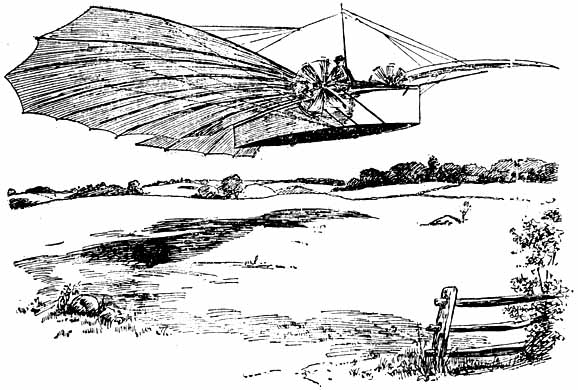
August 14, 1901: The alleged flight of the Condor 21

The following events occurred in August 1901:

== August 1, 1901 (Thursday) ==
- A constitutional change that disenfranchised most African-American voters was approved in Maryland.
- W. F. Wright, a farmer and a former official with the Nebraska Department of Agriculture, ended his experiment at bring a rainfall by firing cannons at a clear sky after two days. Starting the previous afternoon, Wright and his assistants lined up 24 mortars at his farm near Lincoln, Nebraska, loaded them with gunpowder, and fired them once a minute until his supply of several thousand pounds of gunpowder was exhausted, to test Wright's own theory of "special vibration". Wright explained his theory that clouds were not formed from evaporation of water and that hydrogen and oxygen in the atmosphere could only combine to form water if "outside force is brought to bear upon them", and that the force was atmospheric electricity. The concussion from firing a cannon, Wright told reporters, created friction that would produce the atmospheric electricity necessary to form water. The next day, the area around Lincoln steadily cooled off and temperatures dropped 41 degrees over a period of 38 hours, and on August 3, heavy rain came down "throughout the northern portion of Nebraska, southern South Dakota and the northern portion of Iowa", and Wright declared that he had been the person responsible.
- Born: Francisco Guilledo, Filipino professional boxer who competed under the name "Pancho Villa" and was the one-time world flyweight boxing champion; in Ilog, Negros Occidental (d. 1925)

== August 2, 1901 (Friday) ==
- The British government established colonial governments for Boer territory captured from the Orange Free State and the South African Republic, creating the Orange River Colony and the Transvaal Colony.
- Joseph Chamberlain, Secretary of State for the Colonies for the United Kingdom, stated in the House of Commons that the British concentration camps in South Africa were "the only humane alternative to leaving the women and general on the 'desert veld'.
- Born: Ignatius Kung Pin-Mei, Archbishop of Shanghai (and later a Roman Catholic Cardinal) who was imprisoned by the People's Republic of China from 1955 until 1988; in Shanghai (d. 2000)

== August 3, 1901 (Saturday) ==
- HMS Viper, the first navy ship ever to be powered by steam turbine propulsion and described as the "fastest vessel in the world", was wrecked beyond repair during Royal Navy maneuvers near the Channel Islands. Operating in poor weather, the lightweight Viper struck a reef near the island of Alderney, ripping out the bottom of its hull. Its sister ship, HMS Cobra, would be wrecked less than seven weeks later.
- Three explorers made the first ascent of Canada's 11,870-foot (3,620 m) Mount Assiniboine, described as "one of the classic mountaineering peaks of the world".
- Born:
  - Pavel Mif, Soviet Comintern organizer who guided the development of the Chinese Communist Party during the 1920s and 1930s, and oversaw the indoctrination of Chinese leaders at Moscow's Sun Yat-sen University; as Mikhail Fortus in Kherson, Ukraine (executed 1938)
  - John C. Stennis, U.S. Senator for Mississippi from 1947 to 1989; near De Kalb, Mississippi (d. 1995)
- Died: William W.B. Beach, 74, British politician who had been the "Father of the House of Commons" (i.e., the oldest MP) since 1899

== August 4, 1901 (Sunday) ==
- Prime Minister Katsura Tarō of Japan convened a secret meeting of the genrō, the empire's group of elder statesmen, and discussed an alliance with the British Empire. Former prime minister Itō Hirobumi, who had advocated an alliance with the Russian Empire as a means of averting the conflict over the control of the Korean peninsula, agreed with the rest of the elders that an alliance with the United Kingdom would be in Japan's best interests. and volunteered to prepare a draft proposal for negotiating with the British. With the possibility of an agreement with Russia no longer under consideration, relations between the Japanese and Russian Empires would continue to deteriorate and the two would go to war within two and a half years.
- Born: Louis Armstrong, American jazz musician; in New Orleans (d. 1971). During his lifetime, Louis Armstrong believed that he had been born on July 4, 1900. In 1988, seventeen years after Armstrong's death, however, biographer Gary Giddins located the record of the musician's 1901 baptism at the Sacred Heart of Jesus Church and found the true birthdate.

== August 5, 1901 (Monday) ==
- Peter O'Connor of Ireland set a new world record for the long jump, leaping almost 25 feet to 24'11¾" and gaining recognition from the International Association of Athletics Federations. O'Connor's mark would stand for 20 years.
- King Edward and Queen Alexandra came aboard RRS Discovery on the eve of its departure. Dr. Edward Wilson, the ship's surgeon, noted in his diary that "The King shook hands with us all round when he came on board, and again when he left. The Queen also. The King gave the Victorian Order of the Fourth Class to Captain Scott before leaving, having with great difficulty fished it out of his tail-coat pocket, which was a long way round on the wrong side of his stout figure."
- Robbers dug a tunnel underneath the vault of the Selby Smelting and Lead Company in Vallejo, California, and escaped with 1,200 pounds (540 kg) of gold, worth $280,000 at the time. The equivalent of $280,000 in 2016 would be over $7.5 million, but at more than $1,300 for an ounce of gold in 2016, the value of the haul would be more than $25 million. Most of the loot would be recovered four days later after a former employee confessed to the crime and led investigators to the hiding place.
- Died: Victoria, Empress of Germany, 60, the daughter of Queen Victoria of the United Kingdom, sister of Edward VII, wife of Friedrich III, and the mother of Wilhelm II of Germany.

== August 6, 1901 (Tuesday) ==
- Captain Robert Falcon Scott of the Royal Navy and the research ship RRS Discovery, set sail from the port of Cowes on the Isle of Wight and departed the United Kingdom to start the British National Antarctic Expedition. Besides Scott, the Discovery carried with it five scientists, eleven other Royal Navy officers, and a 36-man crew. The ship would reach Antarctica on January 8, and anchor at McMurdo Sound on February 3.
- The Monacan steam yacht Princess Alice II, owned by Prince Albert of Monaco and loaned out by him for scientific exploration, set a record for the greatest depth, up that time, at which bottom trawling had ever taken place, collecting plankton and other undersea life at a depth of 6,035 meters (19,800 ft), at a location southwest of the Cape Verde Islands. The depth would not be exceeded until 1947, when the Swedish vessel Albatross trawled in the Puerto Rico Trench.
- The town of Lawton, Oklahoma, came into being as the United States Land Office began auctioning lots divided from a 320-acre townsite located near the United States Army's Fort Sill. The auction "drew an overnight population of ten thousand. Mostly it was made up of men, with their families, who had failed to secure 160-acre homesteads in the lottery of August 1 and came to the townsite in the hope of bidding successfully at the sale of lots. By August 3, in anticipation of the sale, four hundred temporary business structures, nearly all tents, had been raised; a newspaper, the Lawton State Democrat, was being printed; and three streets had been laid out."

== August 7, 1901 (Wednesday) ==
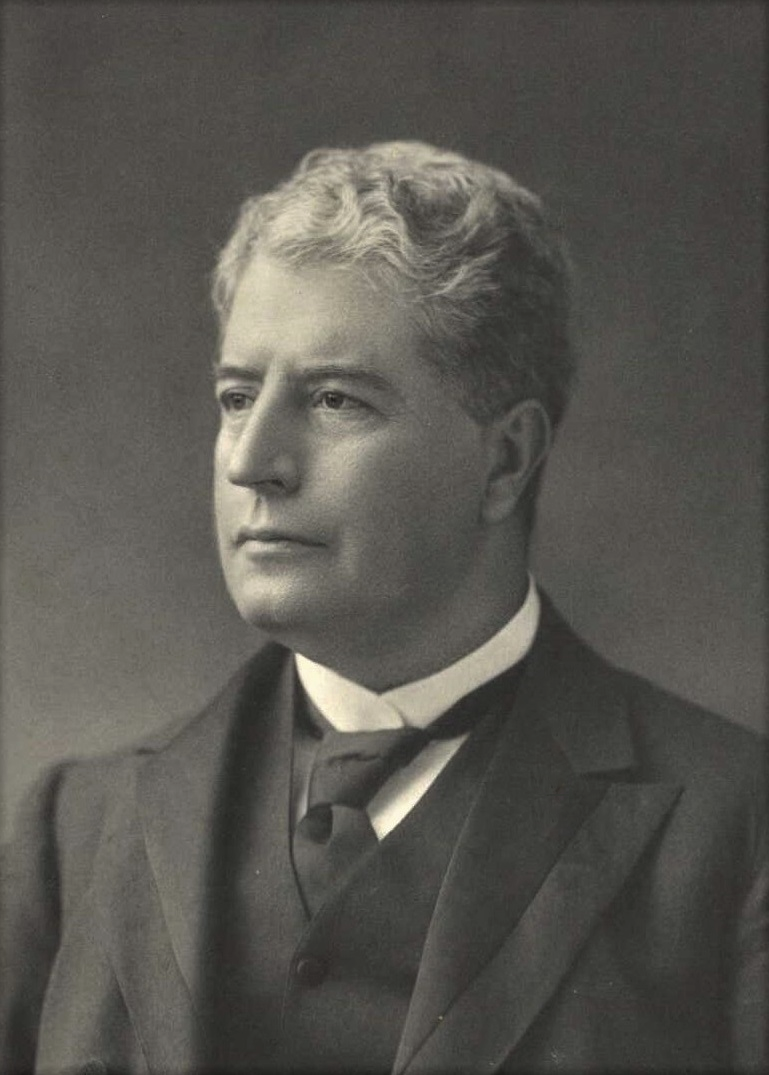
Barton

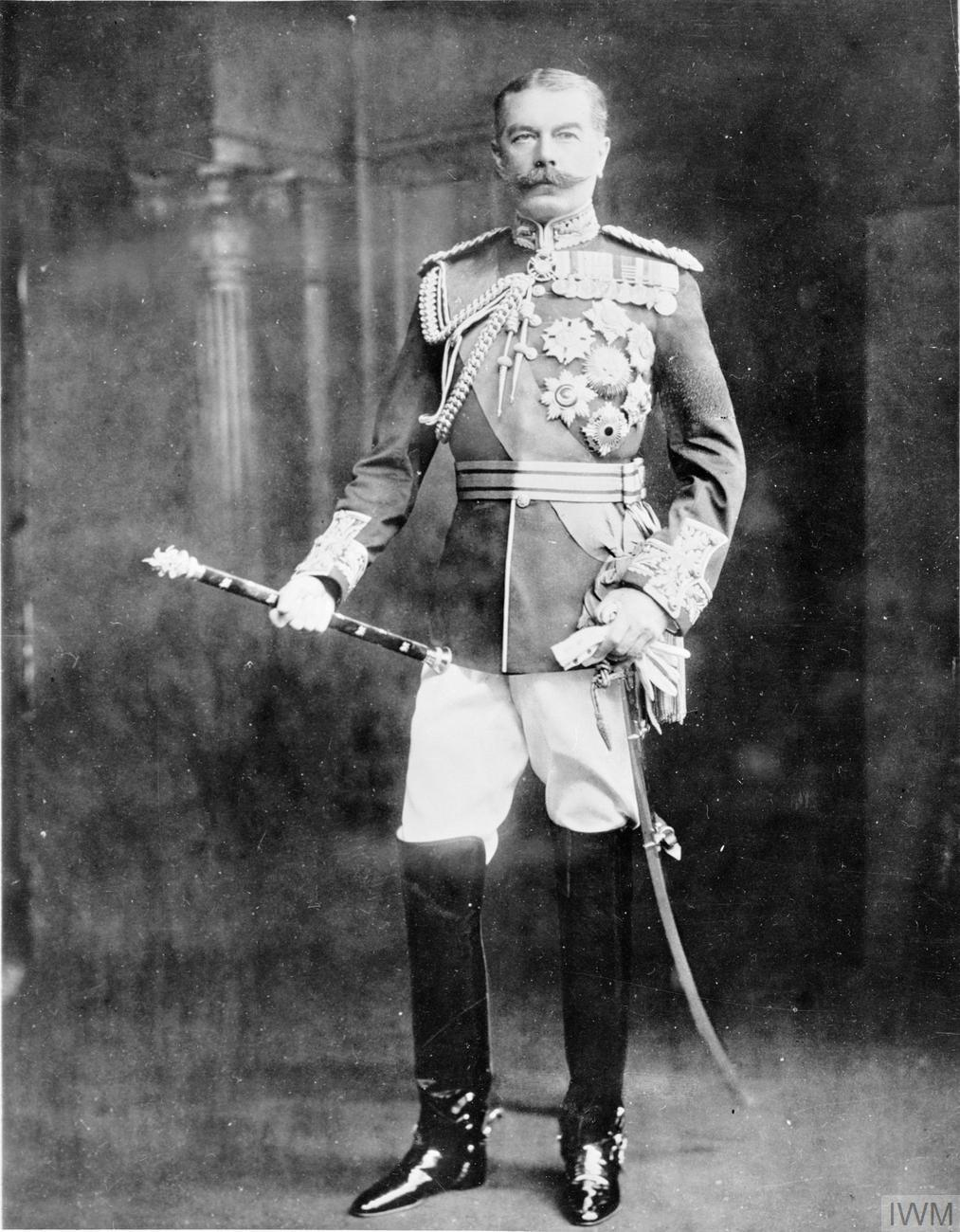
Kitchener

- Prime Minister Edmund Barton introduced the Immigration Restriction Act 1901 into the Australian House of Representatives as the Federation's first legislation to further the "White Australia policy". Barton informed his fellow MPs "We are guarding the last part of the world in which the higher races can live and increase freely for the higher civilization. I place before the House a measure of definite and high policy."
- Within Britain's Protectorate of Uganda, the Uganda Agreement was ratified by the Kingdom of Ankole and its King, the Omugabe Kahaya. The pact outlined Ankole's boundaries within southwest Uganda and defined British jurisdiction over its relations with the other kingdoms.
- Field Marshal Herbert Kitchener of the British Army issued a proclamation giving all Boer soldiers until September 15 to surrender, or to be exiled permanently from South Africa if captured and to have their property confiscated at war's end. "He was disappointed that it had no effect," an historian would write later, "for he was anxious to leave South Africa so that he could take up the post of Commander-in-Chief in India, an office that he had been promised by the Viceroy, Lord Curzon."
- The British House of Commons enacted an amendment to its cloture rule, reducing the number of votes necessary to end a filibuster against legislation. The rule was used the next day for the first time.
- The White Star ocean liner RMS Oceanic rammed and sank an Irish freight vessel, the Kincorn, off the coast of Tuskar Rock in Ireland. Seven of the Kincorn crew were drowned as the steamship went down, while 14 others were rescued.
- Future Baseball Hall of Fame inductee and Milwaukee Brewers manager Hugh Duffy punched an American League umpire, Al Mannassau, in the jaw after Mannassau's controversial call led to the team's 5–4 loss to the Cleveland Bluebirds. In the final inning, Milwaukee had a 4–3 lead when Cleveland's Jack Bracken (who was playing his first major league game) hit the ball deep into left field along the foul line. Duffy thought the ball was foul, and Mannassau ruled that it was fair, allowing two runs to come in and ending the game. Despite the magnitude of his offense, Duffy was suspended for 12 days rather than being banned for life from the American League, and would go on to a long career.
- The U.S. Navy gunboat Machias was dispatched to Colon on the isthmus of Panama, at that time still part of Colombia, in order to be on standby during the war between Colombia and Venezuela.
- Born: Ann Harding (stage name for Dorothy Walton Gatley), American stage and film actress; at Fort Sam Houston near San Antonio, Texas (d. 1981)
- Died:
  - General Oreste Baratieri, 61, who had commanded Italian troops in their defeat by Ethiopian soldiers in the Battle of Adwa (b. 1841)
  - Virchand Gandhi, 36, British Indian religious leader and promoter of Jainism, died from a lung hemorrhage (b. 1864)
  - Josiah Johnson Hawes, 94, called "the oldest photographer in the world". Sixty-eight years earlier, he and his business partner Albert Southworth had opened the Southworth & Hawes studio in Boston (b. 1808)

== August 8, 1901 (Thursday) ==
- Alberto Santos-Dumont was nearly killed on his third attempt at flying a dirigible around the Eiffel Tower to win the Deutsch Prize of 100,000 French francs. As before, his task was to depart the Longchamp Racecourse, fly to the Tower and circle it three times, then return to his starting point in less than half an hour. Departing at 6:12 in the morning, he reached the Tower and completed the circuits within nine minutes but then lost control of the airship on his way back. The balloon deflated, and several of the wires connecting the framework and Santos-Dumont were severed by the turning screw that propelled the ship forward, sending the Brazilian-born aviator skimming over rooftops before wrecking on the roof of the Exposition Trocadro hotel. A team of firemen rescued him after the frame became wedged between two buildings. Asked what he would do now that his airship was wrecked, Santos-Dumont reportedly said, "Why begin again, of course. One has to have patience."
- Born: Ernest Lawrence, American physicist and 1939 Nobel Prize laureate for his invention of the cyclotron; in Canton, South Dakota (d. 1958)
- Died:
  - Prince Edmond de Polignac, 67, French classical music composer (b. 1834)
  - Jesse Jamison, Principal Chief of the Seneca Nation in western New York, was killed in a gunfight with another member of the Seneca tribe.

== August 9, 1901 (Friday) ==
- U.S. President William McKinley made arrangements to attend the Pan-American Exposition in Buffalo, New York on September 5, after meeting at his summer home in Canton, Ohio with the president and the director of the exposition, who designated the 5th as "President's Day". The original plan was for the presidential party to visit the event, then to "spend a day at Niagara Falls before returning to Cleveland" to attend an encampment of American Civil War veterans, the Grand Army of the Republic. Instead of returning home, however, the president would visit the Pan-American event a second day, and would be fatally wounded by anarchist Leon Czolgosz on September 6.
- The city of Rantoul, Illinois, which would later serve the nearby Chanute Air Force Base, was destroyed by a fire that had been ignited by an Illinois Central Railroad train passing through downtown. Hot cinders from the locomotive set fire to the contents of a grain elevator during a heat wave and drought, and strong winds spread the blaze through the business district, destroying 54 businesses and nine homes, at an estimated loss of $314,000 (equivalent to $8.4 million).

== August 10, 1901 (Saturday) ==
- France withdrew all of its forces from China, with the exception of the legation guard that protected the French diplomatic mission in Beijing.
- The "Moberly–Jourdain incident" gave rise to one of the more famous "ghost stories" of the early 20th century, which Charlotte Anne Moberly and Eleanor Jourdain would recount a decade later in their bestselling book An Adventure. Both of them were administrators at St Hugh's College, a women's college associated with the University of Oxford. While in France visiting the Palace of Versailles, they walked into the Petit Trianon, a château on the grounds of the former French royal palace. According to the 1911 book, they not only saw the ghost of Marie Antoinette (who had been arrested at that location on August 10, 1792), but her companions as well. After researching the era, they would conclude that they had witnessed the area as it had looked exactly 109 years earlier, by experiencing the memories that two different people had had in 1792, with Jourdain seeing from the point of view of the doomed Queen of France, and Moberly watching through the eyes of one of the Queen's escorts.
- King Edward and Queen Alexandra departed the United Kingdom for six weeks, sailing to Germany, sailing on the yacht Victoria to attend the memorial service for the King's sister at Kronberg.
- Following his celebrated return visit to the United Kingdom, British colonial administrator Alfred Milner departed on a 17-day voyage back to South Africa, to begin his work as the governor of the new Orange River Colony and Transvaal Colony.
- Members of the Amalgamated Association of Iron, Steel, and Tin Workers began a strike against United States Steel Corporation after failing to reach a settlement of their demands, and 14,000 employees walked off the job.
- The United States Department of Agriculture announced that the drought of summer had destroyed at least half of the American corn crop for the year, a greater loss than the USDA had anticipated. Nationwide, food prices showed an unprecedented increase from the year before, with potatoes and corn more than doubled; tomatoes and onions tripled; and a sixfold increase in the price of peas, carrots, beets, cucumbers and radishes. Meat prices increased between 35 and 60 percent, as did many fruits, but the price of apples had tripled.
- Born: Franco Rasetti, Italian scientist; in Castiglione del Lago (d. 2001)

== August 11, 1901 (Sunday) ==
- The German Antarctic Expedition, led by Professor Erich von Drygalski, began with the departure of the ship Gauss from Kiel. Guided by Captain Hans Ruser, the ship had a crew of five officers, 27 crew, and Drygalski's five-member team. After reaching the previously-unexplored area of Antarctica between 60° E and 100° E, the ship would come within 46 miles (74 km) of the coast of what Drygalski would claim for Germany as Kaiser Wilhelm II Land, but would be trapped in an icefield on February 22, 1902, and be unable to depart for 14 months. After getting free, the Gauss would successfully return to Kiel on November 24, 1903.
- Venezuela and Colombia severed diplomatic relations following the second of two invasions from Colombia by Venezuelan exiles. Colombia authorized the American chargé d'affaires in Caracas to act on its behalf.

== August 12, 1901 (Monday) ==
- Cotton manufacturers in Fall River, Massachusetts, voted unanimously to enact a 14% cut in wages, effective September 3.
- Two men became the first people to take an automobile to the summit of Pikes Peak. Driver William B. Felker, Jr. and mechanic Charles A. Yont took a steam-powered Locomobile along a treacherous road used for horse-drawn carriages, and found the descent even more dangerous. There were no other attempts to ascend Pikes Peak until nearly 12 years later.
- Born: Robert Francis, American poet; in Upland, Pennsylvania (d. 1987)
- Died:
  - Francesco Crispi, 82, Prime Minister of Italy from 1893 to 1896 (b. 1818)
  - Adolf Erik Nordenskiöld, 60, Swedish naturalist and Arctic explorer; a group of islands, a portion of Sweden, a fjord in Greenland, and a crater on Mars were later named in his honor (b. 1832)
  - Ernest de Jonquières, 81, French mathematician (b. 1820)

== August 13, 1901 (Tuesday) ==
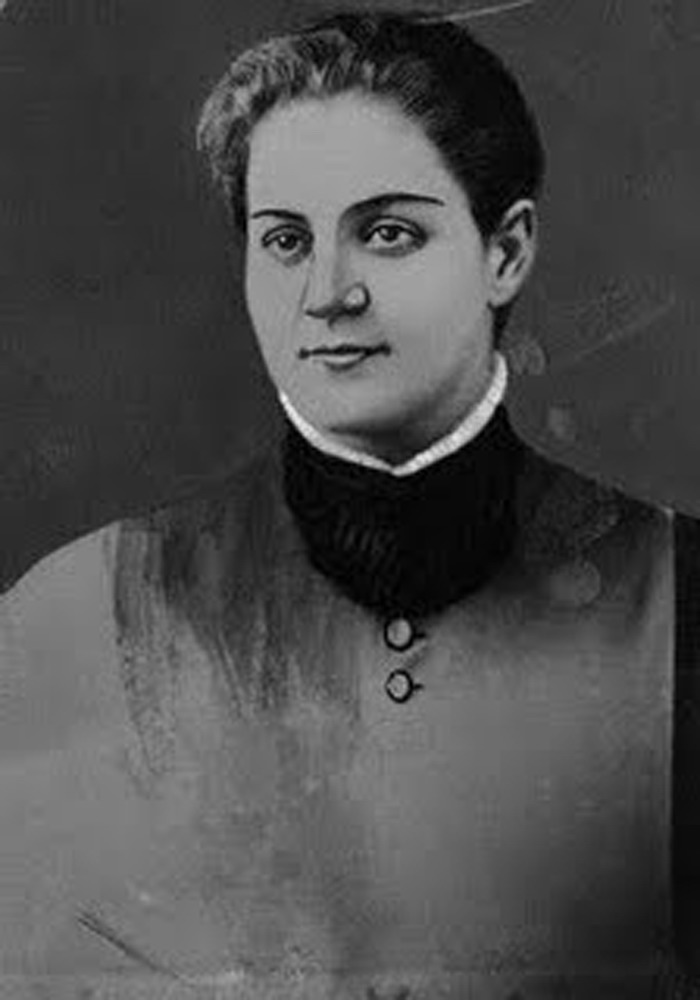
Jolly Jane Toppan

- Serial killer Jane Toppan claimed her last victim, with the death of Minnie Davis Gibbs. During the summer of 1901, the nurse nicknamed "Jolly Jane" because of her cheerful disposition had come to work for the Davis family in Boston, and within the space of six weeks, Minnie's mother, father and two sisters had died. When Minnie died, the cause of death was listed as "exhaustion", blamed on her grief from losing her family, but her father-in-law was suspicious and sought the help of Dr. Edward S. Wood of Harvard University's College of Medicine. Minnie's body would be exhumed for an autopsy, which would show high levels of arsenic, morphine and atropine, and Toppan would be arrested on October 29.

== August 14, 1901 (Wednesday) ==
- German-born American aviator Gustave Whitehead drove the Condor 21 along a road in Bridgeport, Connecticut, pulled its canvassed wings taut, and flew for fifty feet, banked sharply to avoid hitting a stand of chestnut trees, and continued "through the air for more than a mile" before landing again, according to his own account and that of a reporter for the Bridgeport Herald. However, no photograph was ever taken of the Condor 21 in flight, nor of even longer flights that the newspaper reported to have been made in the two years before the Wright brothers flew at Kitty Hawk, North Carolina. Reproductions of the Condor, constructed from Whitehead's blueprints, would be flown in 1986 and in 1997. More than 35 years after the event, on April 2, 1937, a person identified as a Whitehead assistant in the Herald articles, James Dickie, would write, "I believe the entire story in the Herald was imaginary, and grew out of comments of Whitehead in discussing what he hoped to get from his plane. I was not present and did not witness any airplane flight on August 14, 1901."
- Russia declared its right of suzerainty over the Chinese port of Nuzhuang (now Yingkou).

Clara Maass

- In Havana, American nurse Clara Maass, who had already survived allowing herself to be bitten by an infected mosquito on June 24 for the cause of discovering a vaccine against yellow fever, volunteered for the experiment a second time, "hoping to prove that her earlier case of yellow fever had immunized her against the disease." Instead, she would become even more severely ill, and die ten days later. The Las Animas Hospital would be renamed in her honor, and she would be honored decades later as a martyr to the cause of medicine, on postage stamps issued in Cuba in 1951, and in the United States in 1979.
- Born:
  - Muhammad Ayub Khuhro, Chief Minister of Pakistan's Province of Sindh when the nation became independent in 1947, and later Defense Minister of Pakistan; in Larkana, Bombay Presidency, British India (d. 1980)
  - Alice Rivaz, Swiss writer; in Rovray, Vaud canton (d. 1998)

== August 15, 1901 (Thursday) ==
- The sinking of the steamer SS Islander killed 65 of the 171 people on board, after the Canadian Pacific Navigation Company ship struck an iceberg near Douglas Island off of the coast of Juneau, Alaska. The ship had moved ahead in a heavy fog, and the collision tore an immense hole in the bow, causing water to come rushing in before the water-tight compartment doors could be closed. Compounding the disaster was that the engine room exploded as lifeboats were being lowered.
- L. C. R. Duncombe-Jewell founded the Celtic Cornish Society to work toward the revival of the Cornish language that had been spoken in Cornwall, the westernmost county in Great Britain, before declining in the 18th century.
- Born: Arnulfo Arias, President of Panama 1940–1941 and 1949–1951; in Penonomé, Colombia (now Panama) (d. 1988)

== August 16, 1901 (Friday) ==
- The population of Canada was announced as 5,338,883 people, an increase of ten percent in the previous decade.

== August 17, 1901 (Saturday) ==
- General Leónidas Plaza was declared to be the winner in the elections for President of Ecuador, two weeks before the scheduled August 31 election day.
- The crew of the General Slocum, a steamship which would be destroyed in 1904 in New York City's worst disaster of the 20th century, fought off an attempt by passengers to seize control of the vessel. The ill-fated Slocum could be rented for excursions, and was carrying a party of "nine hundred drunken anarchists" from Paterson, New Jersey, when a riot broke out. The crew of 22 was able to fight back against the mob, and steamed to the pier used by the boats of the New York City Police Department, where 17 of the instigators were arrested.
- The United States Navy sent a second gunboat, the USS Ranger, to the isthmus of Panama.
- Born:
  - Malcolm MacDonald, British Secretary of State for Dominion Affairs 1935–1939, and Secretary of State for the Colonies, 1938–1940; in Lossiemouth, Scotland (d. 1981)
  - Heðin Brú (pen name for Hans Jacob Jacobsen), Faroese language novelist and translator; in Skálavík, Faroe Islands, Denmark (d. 1987)

== August 18, 1901 (Sunday) ==
- In Pierce City, Missouri, all of the African-American residents were driven from town by a white mob following the murder of Gisella Wild, a 24-year-old white woman. The vigilantes invaded the black section of the segregated town, burned and looted houses, and ordered the more than 200 black citizens to get on a train and leave permanently, or risk being killed. Other rural towns and counties in southwestern Missouri would follow Pierce City's example, including neighboring Barry County, Monett and Neosho. Stroud, Oklahoma followed the Pierce City example two weeks later. Miss Wild's murderer was never convicted, but one black suspect was taken from jail by the mob and lynched, while another was tried and acquitted, and two others were released without being indicted. The 2010 census for Pierce City would show two African-American residents (0.22%) among its population of 1,292 people. Disgusted by the mob mentality in his home state of Missouri, author Mark Twain would write an essay, "The United States of Lyncherdom", commenting on "man's commonest weakness, his aversion to being unpleasantly conspicuous, pointed at, shunned, as being on the unpopular side. Its other name is Moral Cowardice, and is the commanding feature of the make-up of 9,999 men in the 10,000." He added that in the case of a lynching, most of the vast majority of people were "right-hearted and compassionate, and would be cruelly pained by such a spectacle— and would attend it, and let on to be pleased with it, if the public approval seemed to require it."
- Born:
  - Lucienne Boyer, French singer; in Paris (d. 1983)
  - Jean Guitton, French writer and philosopher; in Saint-Étienne, Loire département (d. 1999)
  - Wing-tsit Chan, Chinese-born American philosopher, in Kaiping, Guangdong province (d. 1994)
- Died: Edmond Audran, 61, French composer (b. 1840)

== August 19, 1901 (Monday) ==
- The U.S. steamship City of Golconda capsized in a storm as it was sailing down the Ohio River from Elizabethtown, Illinois to Paducah, Kentucky, killing 11 passengers and four crew.
- The Duke of Cornwall, who would become King George V in 1910, was welcomed at Cape Town, in Britain's Cape Colony in South Africa.
- Died: Shō Tai, 58, the last monarch of the Ryukyu Kingdom before the islands were formally annexed to Japan (b. 1843)

== August 20, 1901 (Tuesday) ==
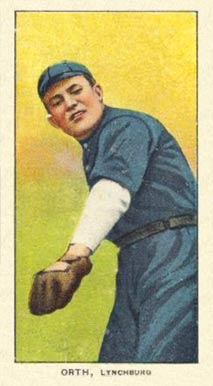
"Umpire" Al Orth

- In the years when only one umpire was provided for a major league baseball game, it was not unusual for players not in the lineup to handle the officiating if the regular umpire failed to show up, in which case the procedure was for the opposing managers to each select a player to handle officiating duties. Al Orth of the Philadelphia Phillies earned the distinction of umpiring and playing in the same game, when he was put in as a pinch hitter in the ninth inning, and hit a single to drive in a run in a 3–2 loss to the Brooklyn Dodgers. Orth's feat would later be described as "the first instance on record where an umpire was called to bat to win a game."
- The battleship USS Iowa was dispatched to the Pacific coast of the isthmus of Panama as the third U.S. Navy ship to monitor fighting between Colombia and Venezuela.
- The disenfranchisement of African-American voters in Alabama was made possible as the constitutional convention in Montgomery closed with the approval for a draft of the state's 1901 constitution, which would be ratified by the voters on November 21.
- Born: Salvatore Quasimodo, Italian poet, 1959 Nobel Prize in Literature laureate; in Modica, Sicily (d. 1968)

== August 21, 1901 (Wednesday) ==
- A group of 509 American schoolteachers (368 men and 141 women) arrived in Manila after being recruited to teach throughout the U.S. territory of the Philippines as employees of the Department of Public Instruction. Teaching Filipino students in English, preparing many of them for the prospect of attending college in the United States, and instructing all children in the American way of life, the new teachers and their successors would become known as "the Thomasites" because the 509 had arrived on the United States Army Transport Thomas.
- Representatives from Belgium, Denmark, Finland, France, Germany, Norway, Sweden and the United Kingdom met in Copenhagen and founded the International Federation of Trade Unions (IFTU), the oldest international organization of labor unions, originally called the International Secretariat of National Trade Union Centres.
- Gus Weyhing, the last major league baseball pitcher who refused to wear a baseball glove while on the mound pitched his final game, making his first (and last) appearance for the Cincinnati Reds in a 9–1 loss to the Chicago Cubs.
- France and the Ottoman Empire severed diplomatic relations after the French ambassador said that the Ottoman Sultan had broken his promise to settle disputed French claims. The French cruiser Cussard was dispatched to get Ambassador J.A.E. Constans, who would depart Constantinople on August 26.
- U.S. President William McKinley issued a proclamation inviting "all the Nations of the Earth" to participate in the Louisiana Purchase Exposition, scheduled to be held in St. Louis starting May 1, 1903, encouraging them to send exhibits "as will most fitly illustrate their resources, their industries and their progress in civilization."
- Died: Adolf Eugen Fick, 71, German-born Belgian physician and physiologist known for Fick's laws of diffusion and the Fick principle (b. 1829)

== August 22, 1901 (Thursday) ==
- Wilbur and Orville Wright departed from Kitty Hawk, North Carolina after the failure of their experiments with a glider that could be adapted to become a heavier-than-air flying machine. Their design for a wing provided only one-third of the lift that they had predicted from their calculations. Wilbur would recount later that on the train back to Dayton, Ohio, he told Orville, "Not within a thousand years will man ever fly!" Upon their arrival, however, they concluded that the problem lay in the data gathered by Otto Lilienthal and John Smeaton was incorrect and "they decided to recheck all the earlier data, taking nothing as proven until they proved it themselves."

== August 23, 1901 (Friday) ==
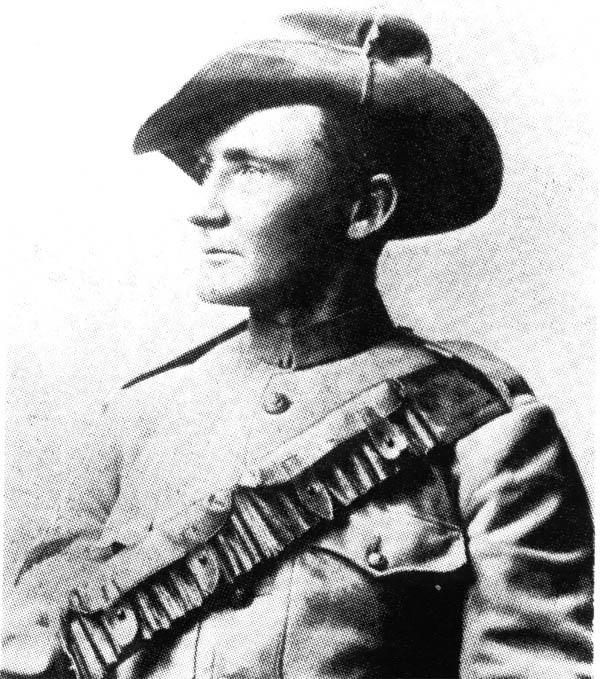
Morant

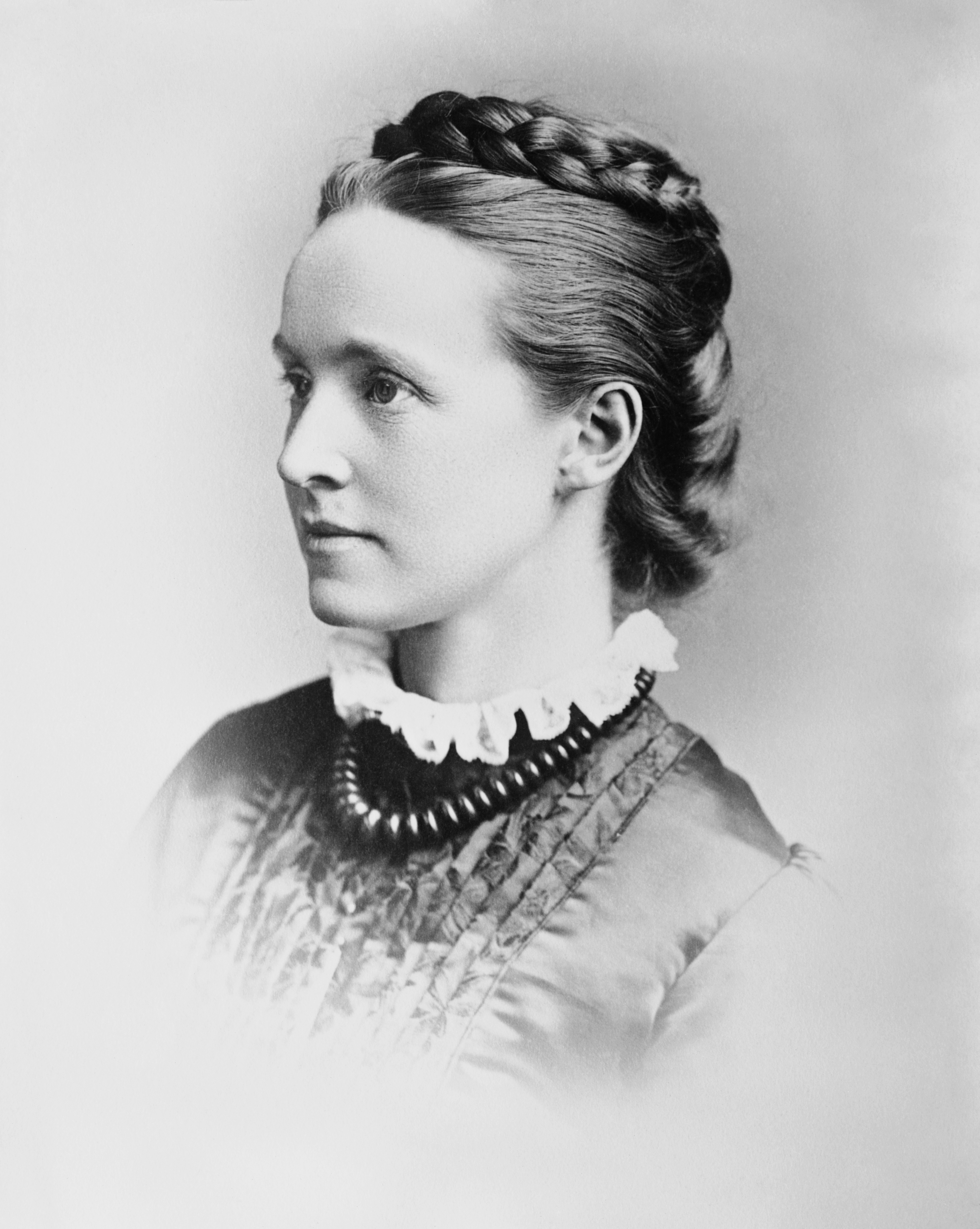
Fawcett

- Reverend Daniel Heese, a German missionary assigned by the Basel Mission, was shot to death along with a young black child, on orders of Lt. Harry "Breaker" Morant of the Bushveldt Carbineers, an Australian infantry division fighting on the British side of the Second Boer War. Heese had been working along with British missionaries in evangelical activities, and he and the child had been the only surviving witnesses to the Carbineers' murder the day before of four Boer schoolteachers and four Afrikaner soldiers. The missionary's murder would expose the atrocities that had been committed by British forces against civilians during the Boer War. Morant and Lt. Peter Handcock would be convicted of numerous murders in their court martial, and executed on February 27, 1902.
- Led by Millicent Fawcett, the "Ladies' Commission" appointed by the British government began its inspection tour of the civilian internment camps set up in South Africa by the British Army during the Second Boer War, starting with the one at Vryburg. On the first camp on the list, they noted that the majority of the 458 internees were living in tents without beds and that there was no school for the children, but concluded that the food and fuel rations were adequate, and advised the superintendent.
- Born:
  - John Sherman Cooper, U.S. Senator for Kentucky between 1946 and 1973, first United States Ambassador to East Germany (1974 to 1976) and member of the Warren Commission; in Somerset, Kentucky (d. 1991)
  - Karl Bechert, German theoretical physicist and political activist; in Nuremberg (d. 1981)

== August 24, 1901 (Saturday) ==
- A war between the Ottoman Empire and the British Empire seemed imminent after the Ottoman gunboat Zuhaf was turned back by a British warship as it attempted to enter the harbor of Kuwait City. Concerned that the Ottomans would attempt to take the port, the British government ordered the Royal Navy to prevent any Ottoman soldiers from debarking. The captain of the British ship warned the Zuhaf captain that any attempt to land men or supplies at Kuwait would be resisted by force, and the Ottoman captain misunderstood and telegraphed a report to Istanbul that the United Kingdom had conquered the Kuwaiti emirate as a colony. The German Empire, alarmed over the perceived change of the balance of power in the Middle East, would join the Ottomans in accusing the British Foreign Office of reneging on its previous pledges. In clearing up the misunderstanding the powers would come to a new agreement that Britain would permit the Kuwait's right to self-rule (suzerainty) but not to the extent that Kuwait would have control over its foreign relations (sovereignty).
- Died: Clara Maass, 25, American nurse who sacrificed her life in an attempt to contribute to a cure for yellow fever, died after deliberately infecting herself in an attempt to build an immunity to the virus (b. 1876)

== August 25, 1901 (Sunday) ==
- The diplomatic crisis between France and the Ottoman Empire appeared settled when the Turkish government agreed to pay 700,000 French francs (equivalent to 150,000 American dollars) to the Quays Company of France as compensation for a breach of contract. Two days later, however, came word that the Sultan had changed his mind, and Ambassador Costans left Constantinople, while Turkey's Ambassador to France, Munir Bey, was sent a request by the French Foreign Ministry to not return to Paris.
- Born:
  - Elmer W. Engstrom, American engineer and business executive who served as president and later chief executive officer for RCA; in Minneapolis (d. 1984)
  - Oliver Cox, Trinidadian-American sociologist; in Port of Spain (d. 1974)

== August 26, 1901 (Monday) ==
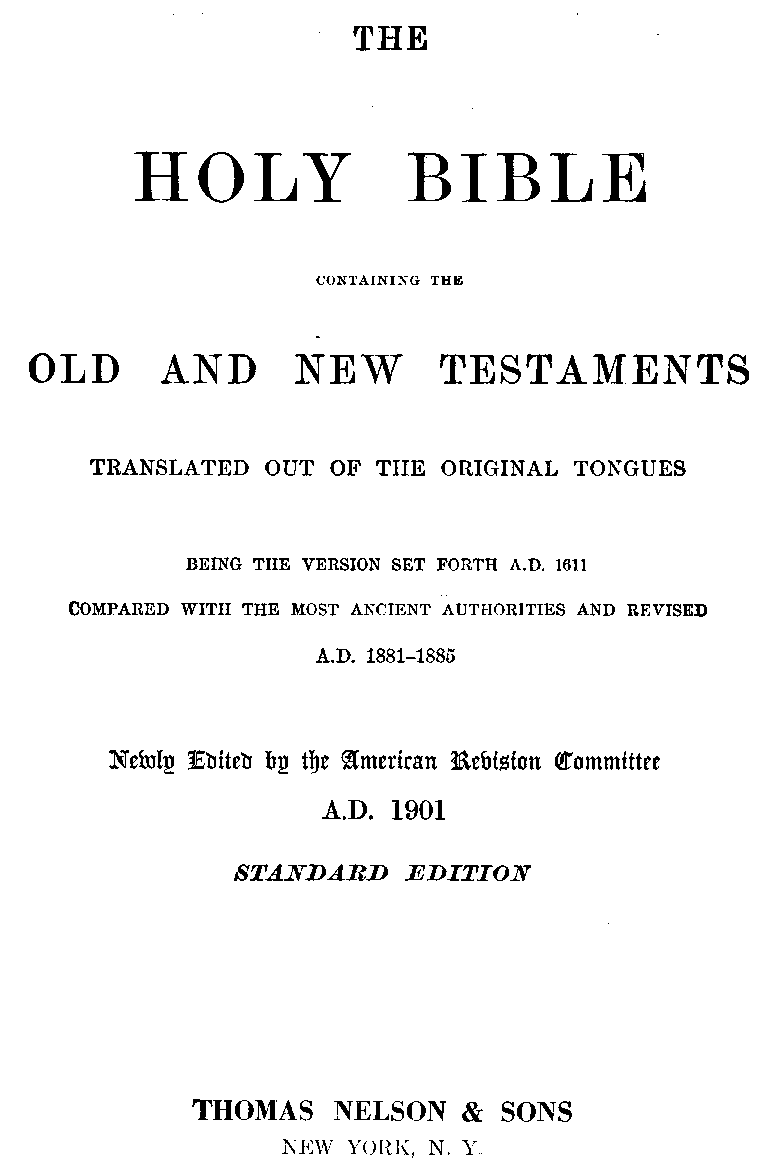
American version

- The American Standard Version of the Bible, a revision of the King James Version, was published by Thomas Nelson and Sons after translators had worked for decades "in hope of a revision that would more adequately represent the American scholars' insights and style of English language."
- The village of Hamtramck, Michigan (pronounced Ham-TRAM-ik) was incorporated. It would be incorporated as a city in 1922, by which time it had become a center for Polish-Americans. Hamtramck and a smaller city that borders it, Highland Park, are entirely surrounded by the city of Detroit.
- Born:
  - General Maxwell D. Taylor, American Chairman of the Joint Chiefs of Staff and later United States Ambassador to South Vietnam during the Vietnam War; in Keytesville, Missouri (d. 1987)
  - Marshal Chen Yi, Chinese general and Foreign Minister of the People's Republic of China from 1958 to 1972; in Sichuan province near Chengdu (d. 1972)
  - Jimmy Rushing, American blues musician; in Oklahoma City (d. 1972)
  - Eleanor Dark, Australian novelist; in Sydney (d. 1985)
  - Adhemar Gonzaga, Brazilian film producer; in Rio de Janeiro (d. 1978)
  - Jan de Quay, Prime Minister of the Netherlands, 1959 to 1963; in 's-Hertogenbosch (d. 1985)

== August 27, 1901 (Tuesday) ==
- In the Congo Free State, a column of Belgian and Congolese soldiers invaded the Kasaï region, where the Batetela tribesmen and their leader, King Kabongo, had been conducting raids against the Luba people for the previous four years. The two sides, both armed with rifles, fought a pitched battle at the village of Kakipango, and the Belgians defeated the Batetela, although small groups would continue to make sporadic raids for another ten years.

== August 28, 1901 (Wednesday) ==
- A boiler explosion killed 24 people on board the steamer City of Trenton. The ship was racing up the Delaware River toward Philadelphia with 150 passengers on board, and was 10 minutes behind schedule when the ship's captain ordered it to move full steam. Reports the next day speculated that Captain Worrell had been attempting to catch up to the Twilight, a steamer from a rival company, which began speeding up as the Trenton approached it. At about 2:00 in the afternoon, the explosion of the port side boiler caused the ship to list and threw passengers from upper decks into the river, while others were scalded by clouds of escaping steam. The final death toll was reported on September 4 to be 24.
- Silliman University, the first American private school in the Philippines, was founded by Presbyterian missionaries David Sutherland Hibbard and his wife, Laura Crooks Hibbard, as the Silliman Institute, a primary school for Filipino boys, with money given by a New York City philanthropist, Dr. Horace Silliman. It would become a university in 1938.
- Voters in Los Angeles approved a bond issue to purchase the privately owned Los Angeles Water Company. The final vote was 6,284 in favor, 1,267 against, well above the necessary two-thirds majority required to allow the city to borrow two million dollars for the purchase. Control of the distribution of water would help the city of 103,000 people triple in size by 1910, and surpass one million residents by the end of the 1920s.
- Born:
  - Babe London (stage name for Jean Glover), American film actress and comedian; in Des Moines, Iowa (d. 1980)
  - Al Ritz, (stage name for Albert Joachim), American film actor and comedian and the eldest of the Ritz Brothers comedy trio; in Newark, New Jersey (d. 1965)
  - Pyotr Novikov, Soviet mathematician known for the Novikov–Boone theorem; in Moscow (d. 1975)
- Died:
  - Zina Huntington Young, 80, Mormon religious leader who had been president of the Church's women's auxiliary, the Relief Society, since 1888. Mrs. Young had been married to the Church's first president, Joseph Smith, until his death in 1844, and to its second president, Brigham Young, until he died in 1877. (b. 1821)

== August 29, 1901 (Thursday) ==
- The British concentration camp at Standerton, in South Africa, became the first to be completely enclosed by barbed wire fences. With 3,329 inmates occupying 550 tents, the camp was surrounded by two rows of fences, by order of the British superintendent, Frank Winfield, who had ordered the inmates to erect the enclosure. On August 11, a party of Boer soldiers had raided the camp and stolen 157 cattle, and the ostensible purpose was to keep in the livestock and keep the enemy from making further raids. However, as author Reviel Netz would note later, this was "a new phenomenon: a human settlement whose boundaries are defined by barbed wire... while raised to prevent motion of Boer men from outside the camp to its inside, the fence immediately served also to prevent the motion of Boer women inside the camp to its outside. They were no longer under curfew; they were now imprisoned."
- The German passenger liner SS Deutschland set a new record for the fastest crossing of the Atlantic Ocean, steaming into Lower New York Bay at 1:20 in the morning, only 5 days, 12 hours and 5 minutes after its departure from Liverpool on Friday evening, August 23. The new mark was 24 minutes faster than the previous record, set by the Deutschland on September 1, 1900.

== August 30, 1901 (Friday) ==
- British inventor Hubert Cecil Booth patented the first motorized vacuum cleaner, after concluding that if a motor could blow air to disperse dust, it could also be reversed to suck dust into a container. Booth originally used his invention as part of his cleaning service "using a large horse-drawn, petrol-driven unit, which was parked outside the building to be cleaned, with hoses stretching through the windows."
- Commanded by Eduard von Toll, the Russian Polar Expedition resumed after the ship Zarya was able to free itself from the ice of the Kara Sea, outside of Nansen Island, located at a latitude of 76°30" N.
- Thirty-six workers who were riding on the Great Northern Railroad through Montana were killed when freight cars from one train crashed into the one on which they were riding. According to reports at the scene, a line of 18 railcars broke loose from a freight train that was climbing a grade near Essex, Montana, and headed downhill toward the station at Nyack, colliding with Great Northern's Passenger Train No. 3 at almost 9:00 in the evening.
- Born:
  - Roy Wilkins, American civil rights leader and NAACP Executive Secretary from 1955 to 1977; in St. Louis (d. 1981)
  - John Gunther, American journalist who authored the 1947 bestseller Inside U.S.A.; in Chicago (d. 1977)

== August 31, 1901 (Saturday) ==
- Leon Czolgosz, a 28-year old former millworker from northern Ohio, arrived in Buffalo, New York by train from Chicago, after learning that U.S. President William McKinley was going to be visiting the Pan-American Exposition September 5. Czolgosz rented a hotel room above John Nowak's Saloon at 1078 Broadway Street at the corner of Broadway and Loepere, and perfected his plan to shoot the president.
