= Joseph Merrell (sheriff) =

American sheriff (1862–1939)

- Born: Joseph Lumpkin Merrell; 1862
- Died: July 24, 1939 (aged 76–77)
- Occupation: Sheriff of Carroll County, Georgia
- Known for: Stopping a lynching

Joseph Lumpkin Merrell (1862 – July 24, 1939) was an American sheriff. He was sheriff of Carroll County, Georgia at the turn of the 20th century who gained nationwide fame for stopping a lynching. Merrell and his men stopped three attempts by lynch mobs to kill Ike Williams, a black man charged with murdering a white boy. One of those shot, mob leader George Bennett, died from his injuries. Articles about his bravery appeared in the New York Evening Post, the Atlanta Constitution, the Louisville Courier Journal, the Washington Star, and the Boston Herald. He is also mentioned by Mark Twain in his 1901 essay The United States of Lyncherdom. Merrell's last name was often misspelled in the press as "Merrill".
