= The United States of Lyncherdom =

1901 essay by Mark Twain

"The United States of Lyncherdom" is an essay by Mark Twain written in 1901. He wrote it in response to the mass lynchings in Pierce City, Missouri, of Will Godley, his grandfather French Godley, and Eugene Carter (also known as Barrett). The three African Americans were accused in the rape and murder there of Gazelle Wild (or Casselle Wilds) on August 19, 1901. Twain blamed lynching in the United States on the herd mentality that prevails among Americans. Twain decided that the country was not ready for the essay, and shelved it.

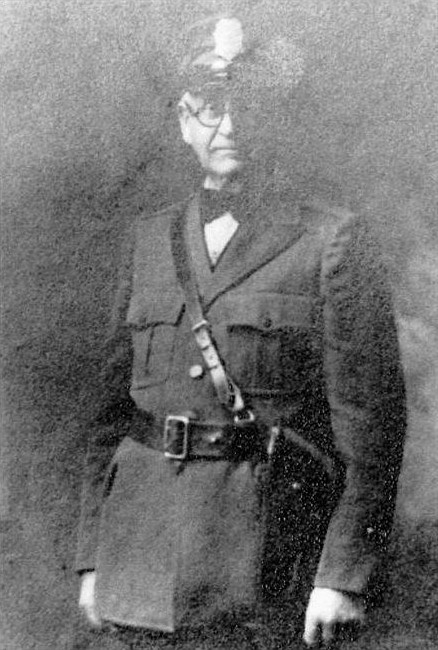
Thomas Beloat was a sheriff of Gibson County, Indiana at the turn of the 20th century noted for stopping a lynching in the county seat of Princeton

A redacted version was published in 1923, when Twain's literary executor, Albert Bigelow Paine, included it in a posthumous collection, Europe and Elsewhere. In his essay, Twain noted two law enforcement officials who had intervened and prevented lynchings in early 20th-century America. They were Sheriff Joseph Merrell of Carroll County, Georgia, and Sheriff Thomas Beloat of Gibson County, Indiana.
