= Evelyn Rawlins (music teacher) =

New Zealand music teacher and community leader

Evelyn Mary Rawlins (1889–1977) was a New Zealand music teacher and community leader. She was born in Palmerston North, Manawatu, New Zealand in 1889.
