= Palmerston North City Library =

Public library in New Zealand

Coordinates: 40°21′22″S 175°36′33″E

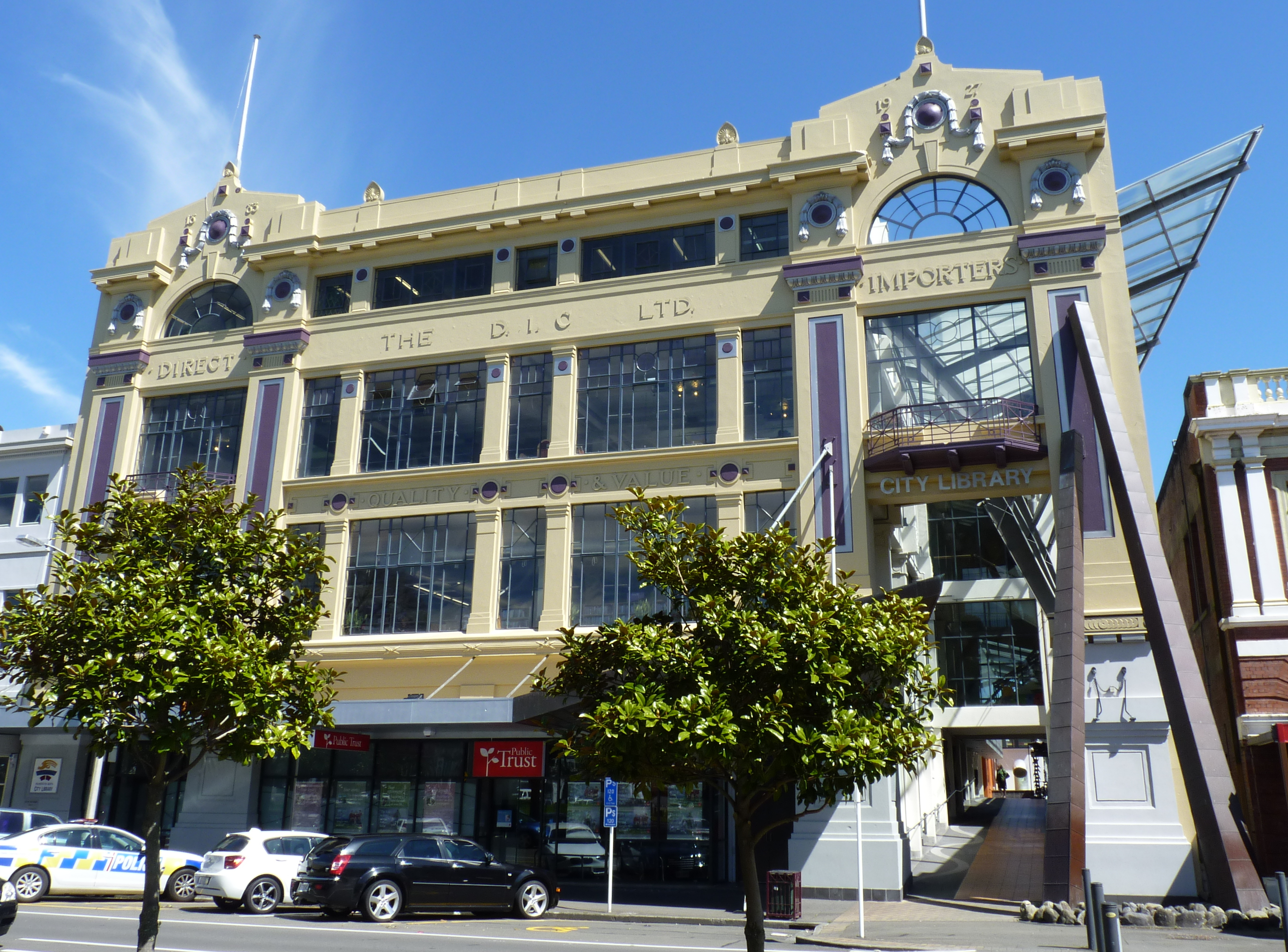
- Palmerston North City Library (2014)
- Location: 4 The Square, Palmerston North, New Zealand
- Type: National library
- Branches: 6 & mobile library

Collection
- Items collected: books, newspapers, magazines, CD, DVD, games

Access and use
- Access requirements: Open to anyone

Other information
- Website: citylibrary.pncc.govt.nz

Heritage New Zealand – Category 2
- Designated: 2 July 1982
- Reference no.: 1256

The Palmerston North City Library is the main public library provided by the Palmerston North City Council for the residents of Palmerston North, New Zealand.

== Purpose ==
The Palmerston North City Library is branded as "The Living Room of the City" and exists "To inspire people to explore the pathways of the world – Te Ara Whanui o Te Ao". It serves the city through a variety of collections that include books, magazines, CDs, DVDs and electronic resources. It provides recreational and educational opportunities from an award-winning building located on The Square in the centre of the City, as well as four other branch libraries around the City.

== Facilities ==
The Palmerston North City Library is located in The Square in the restored and extended C M Ross building. The design for the building was created by New Zealand architect Ian Athfield and was opened in 1996. The library operates from other service points including branches located in the suburbs of Highbury, Roslyn, Awapuni and Ashhurst as well as a Mobile Library Bus.

== History ==
A library service in Palmerston North dates back to June 1876 with the provision of a reading room available to subscription members only. The fledgling service suffered various setbacks including a fire in 1885 which destroyed the entire collection. In 1894 the remainder of the library collections were transferred to the local Fire Brigade which had a members library open to public subscription. In 1900 the Council restarted a public library service with the opening of a public reading room. In 1938 the Council made the library service free to all city residents. The library has occupied a number of buildings over the years and the current central library is the 6th location, now occupying the former D.I.C. department store building.

The former D.I.C. building was registered by the New Zealand Historic Places Trust (since renamed to Heritage New Zealand) on 2 July 1982 as a Category II heritage building with registration number 1256.

In May 1995, Palmerston North Public Library became the first library in New Zealand to offer a self-checkout machine.
