= Palmerston North =

City in Manawatū-Whanganui, New Zealand

Palmerston North Te Papaioea (Māori)
- City
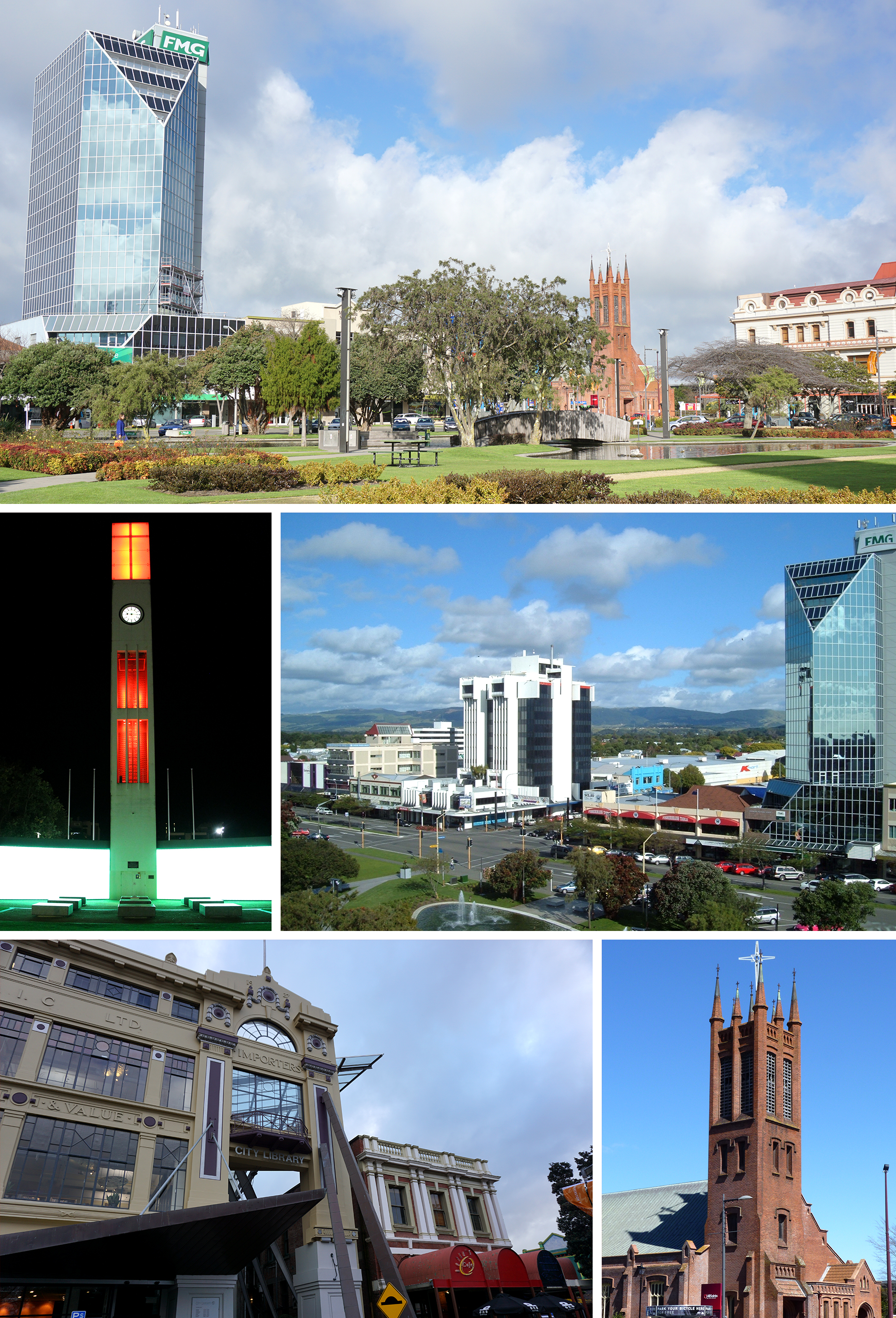
- Clockwise from top: The Square, Central Business District, All Saints' Church, City Library, Hopwood Clock Tower

- Flag Coat of arms
- Nicknames: Palmy, Rose City
- Motto(s): Palmam Qui Meruit Ferat (Let him who has earned it, bear the reward)
- Location within New Zealand
- Coordinates: 40°21.3′S 175°36.7′E
- Country: New Zealand
- Island: North Island
- Region: Manawatū-Whanganui
- Borough proclaimed: 1877
- City proclaimed: 1930
- Electorates: Palmerston North, Rangitīkei; (Māori): Te Tai Hauāuru

Government
  - Mayor: Grant Smith
  - Deputy Mayor: Debi Marshall-Lobb
  - MP: Tangi Utikere (Labour)
  - Territorial authority: Palmerston North City Council

Area
  - Territorial: 394.74 km^{2} (152.41 sq mi)
  - Urban: 77.05 km^{2} (29.75 sq mi)
  - Metro: 978.2 km^{2} (377.7 sq mi)
- Highest elevation: 760 m (2,490 ft)
- Lowest elevation: 10 m (33 ft)

Population (June 2025)
  - Territorial: 90,500
  - Density: 229/km^{2} (594/sq mi)
  - Urban: 81,200
  - Urban density: 1,050/km^{2} (2,730/sq mi)
  - Metro: 99,300
  - Metro density: 102/km^{2} (263/sq mi)
  - Demonym: Palmerstonian
- Time zone: UTC+12 (NZST)
  - Summer (DST): UTC+13 (NZDT)
- Post codes: 4410, 4412, 4414, 4471, 4472, 4475, 4810, 4820
- Area code: 06
- Local iwi: Ngāti Rangitāne
- Website: www.pncc.govt.nz

Palmerston North (/ˈpɑːmərstən/; Māori: Te Papa-i-Oea, colloquially known as Palmerston or Palmy) is a city in the North Island of New Zealand and the seat of the Manawatū-Whanganui region. Located in the eastern Manawatū Plains, the city is near the north bank of the Manawatū River, 35 km (22 mi) from the river's mouth, and 12 km (7 mi) from the end of the Manawatū Gorge, about 140 km (87 mi) north of the capital, Wellington. Palmerston North is the country's eighth-largest urban area, with an urban population of 81,200 (June 2025). The estimated population of Palmerston North city is 90,500 (June 2025).

The official limits of the city take in rural areas to the south, north-east, north-west and west of the main urban area, extending to the Tararua Ranges and including the town of Ashhurst at the mouth of the Manawatū Gorge and the villages of Bunnythorpe and Longburn in the north and west, respectively. The city covers a land area of 395 square kilometres (98,000 acres).

The city's location was once little more than a clearing in a forest and occupied by small communities of Māori, who called it Papa-i-Oea, believed to mean "How beautiful it is". In the mid-19th century, it was settled by Europeans—originally by Scandinavians and, later, British settlers. On foundation, the British settlement was bestowed the name Palmerston, in honour of Viscount Palmerston, a former British Prime Minister. The suffix North was added in 1871 to distinguish the settlement from Palmerston in the South Island. Today, the name is often informally shortened to "Palmy".

Early Palmerston North relied on public works and sawmilling. The west coast railway was built in 1886, linking the town to Wellington, and Palmerston North benefited from a booming pastoral farming industry. Since the early 20th century, Linton Military Camp, Palmerston North Hospital, and the establishment of Massey University (in 1927) have reduced the dependence on farming due to an increase in skilled workers. Popular attractions include Te Manawa (a museum and art gallery that includes the New Zealand Rugby Museum), and several performing arts venues.

== History ==
=== Early settlement ===
Ngāti Rangitāne were the local Māori iwi (tangata whenua) living in the area known as Te Ahu-ā-Tūranga, when a trader, Jack Duff, became the earliest known European to explore the area c. 1830. He came on a whaling ship and explored possibly as far inland as the site of Woodville. He reported his discovery on arrival back to Porirua. Colonel Wakefield heard of the potential that the Manawatu had for development and visited in 1840. In 1846 Charles Hartley, another trader, heard from tangata whenua of a clearing in the Papaioea forest, and he proceeded through the dense bush and forest and discovered it for Europeans.

In 1858, the Government began negotiations with local iwi to purchase land in Manawatu. There was a dispute at the time between the rival iwi Ngāti Rangitāne and Ngāti Raukawa as to who had the right to sell. The dispute is resolved in favour of Rangitāne. On a visit in 1859, John Tiffin Stewart, an employee of the Wellington Provincial Council, was shown the Papaioea clearing by the Rangitāne chief, Te Hirawanu, and noted its suitability for a "good site for a township". In 1864, Te Ahu-a-Turanga Block was sold by Rangitāne to the Government for £12,000, in an effort to open the Manawatu to settlement.

Stewart returned in 1866 on behalf of the Wellington Provincial Council (under whose jurisdiction the new purchase fell) and made the original survey and subdivision in the Papaioea forest clearing. The settlement, named Palmerston to commemorate the recently deceased Prime Minister of Great Britain, was laid out according to Stewart's plan, consisting of a series of wide and straight streets in a rectangular pattern. The focal point was an open space of 17 acres (7 ha) subsequently known as The Square. On 3 October 1866, Palmerston was formally endorsed after Isaac Earl Featherston (Wellington Provincial Superintendent) signed a proclamation defining the boundaries of the settlement. The first sections were sold after.

Among the first settlers included Scandinavians, who arrived in 1871. They established settlements at Awapuni and Whakarongo/Stoney Creek.

Later the same year, the suffix North was added to distinguish the settlement of the same name in Otago. In 1872, a petition was launched to change the name of the settlement. A public meeting in 1873 ends with no clear decision on the name.

The railway line was laid through the Square in 1875. The foundation stone for the original All Saints' Church was laid by Louisa Snelson on 29 September 1875. By 1875 there were newspapers, a doctor and a post office.

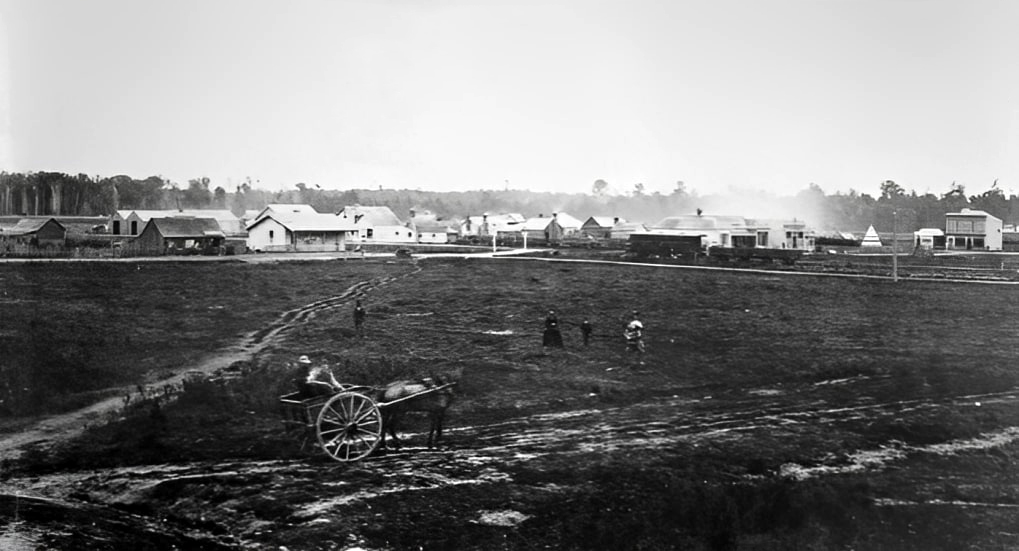
Palmerston North Square 1878

In 1876, Palmerston North became a Local Board District, within the Wellington Provincial Council. This existed until the abolition of the provinces later the same year. Also in the same year, the council set aside land north of the Manawatū River for the purposes of a reserve. In 1890, this land was again set aside and would become, in 1897, the Victoria Esplanade.

=== Growing population ===
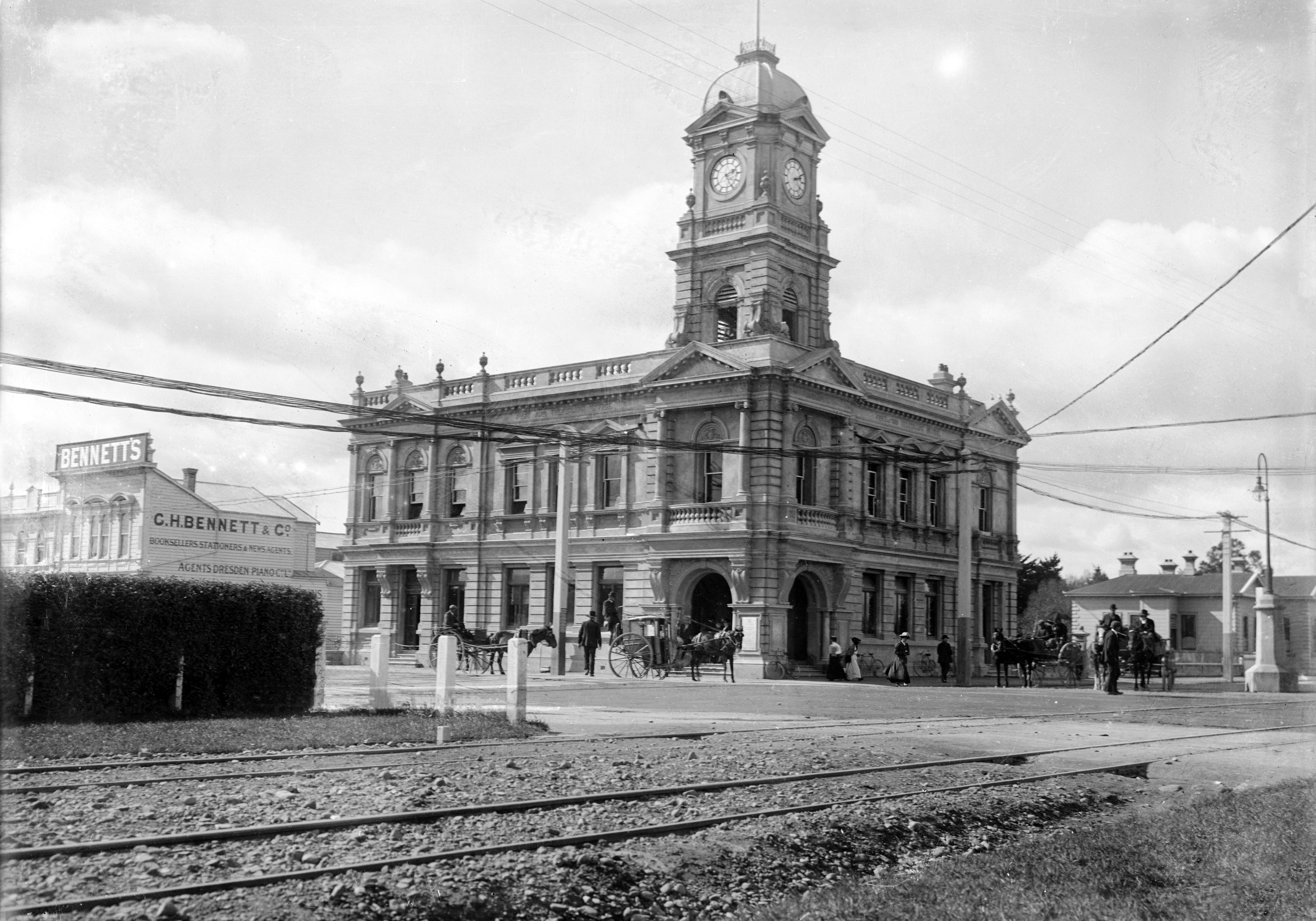
View of the (Chief) Post Office in Palmerston North, (opened in 1906) with the business premises of G H Bennett (booksellers, stationers & newsagents) behind a hedge centre left. There are a number of people, and horses & carriages outside the post office. Photograph taken by William A Price.

By 1877, when the Borough Council came into existence, Palmerston North was an isolated village in the midst of the native forest that covered inland Manawatu. By 1878, the population was 880 and sawmilling was the main industry of the district.

The arrival of the railway in 1886 saw an increase in the speed of growth, and the town was at the centre of a lucrative agricultural district. The opening of the nearby Longburn Freezing Works provided employment, while the Borough Council instigated more infrastructural schemes such as the sewerage system. The Railway through the Manawatū Gorge to Napier was completed in 1891.

In 1893, Rangitāne sold the Hokowhitu block, increasing the area of land available for settlement. In the same year, the Public Hospital opened in a wooden building on Terrace Street (now Ruahine Street). The hospital required significant fundraising. At the end of the decade, the Boer War broke out in South Africa and men from Palmerston North were among the volunteers.

By 1900 the population had reached 6,000. In the 1910s, Palmerston North's growth was steady. The population in 1911 about 10,991 (excluding Māori). The city was affected by World War I, with Awapuni Racecourse being used as an army training camp in 1914. During the course of the war, the Borough Council renamed all German-sounding and foreign street names. When the war finished in 1918, celebrations were delayed due to the Influenza epidemic.

=== City status ===
In 1930, the population reached the 20,000 threshold and Palmerston North was officially proclaimed a city, the 7th in New Zealand. Development was slow due to the Great Depression and World War II. An airport was established at Milson in 1936, which is now Palmerston North Airport. From 1938, the First Labour government (1935–1949) initiated state housing programmes in West End (Savage Crescent precinct) and Roslyn.

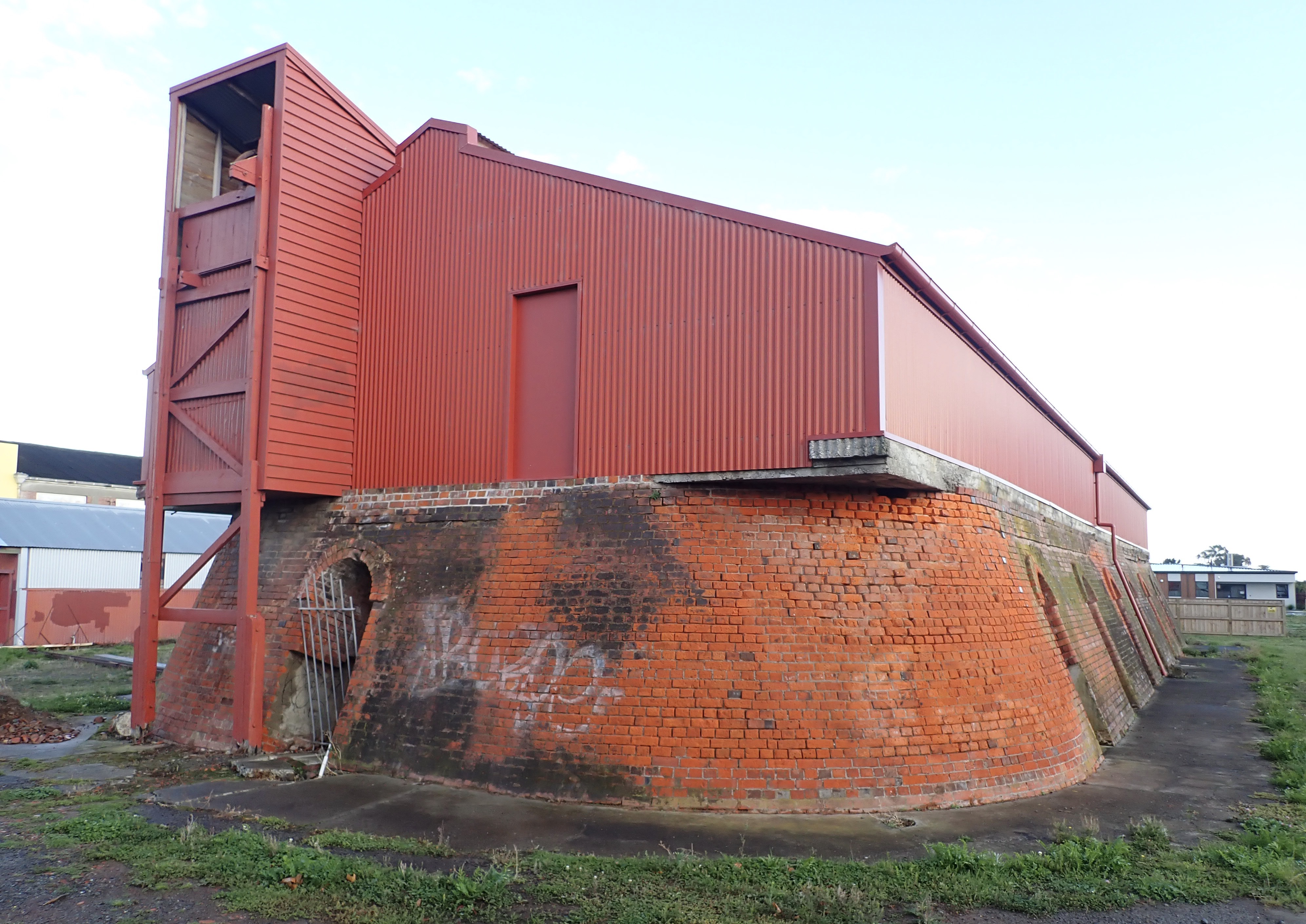
Hoffman Continuous Kiln on Featherston Street

In 1941, the Manawatū River flooded again, having last flooded in 1902. Large parts of Hokowhitu and Awapuni were underwater, with residents evacuating to higher ground (peaked at 5.8m).

In 1940, the Māori Battalion was formed in Palmerston North and trained at the Showgrounds (now Arena Manawatu). In 1942, Linton Army Camp was established. After the war, the city's growth was rapid. In 1949, the city's boundaries had extended to include Milson and Kelvin Grove. In 1953, the boundaries would further extend to include Awapuni, which in the same year, was again flooded by the Manawatū River, along with Hokowhitu. It was the largest flood since 1902.

Although work had started in 1926, it was not until 1959 the Milson Deviation of the North Island Main Trunk was opened. This meant future trains would pass to the north of the city, instead of through the Square. Later in 1963, the railway station at Tremaine Avenue opens. The last trains passed through the Square in 1964.

In 1961, the Highbury was added to the council area. In 1963, Massey University College of Manawatu was formed by the amalgamation of the Massey Agricultural College with the Palmerston North University College. In 1964, it became Massey University, an autonomous tertiary learning institution with the power to grant its own degrees.

In 1967, city boundaries were again extended to include land in Aokautere, Kelvin Grove, Milson, Amberley (Westbrook) and Awapuni as part of future growth for the next 25 years.

In 1969, volunteers established the Esplanade Scenic Railway at Victoria Esplanade. The railway features a 2.2 km (1.4 mi) miniature railway track offering 20-minute rides through native bush.

In 1970, the New Zealand Rugby Museum was established and a tribute to the founding father of rugby in New Zealand, Charles Munro, was opened at Massey University.

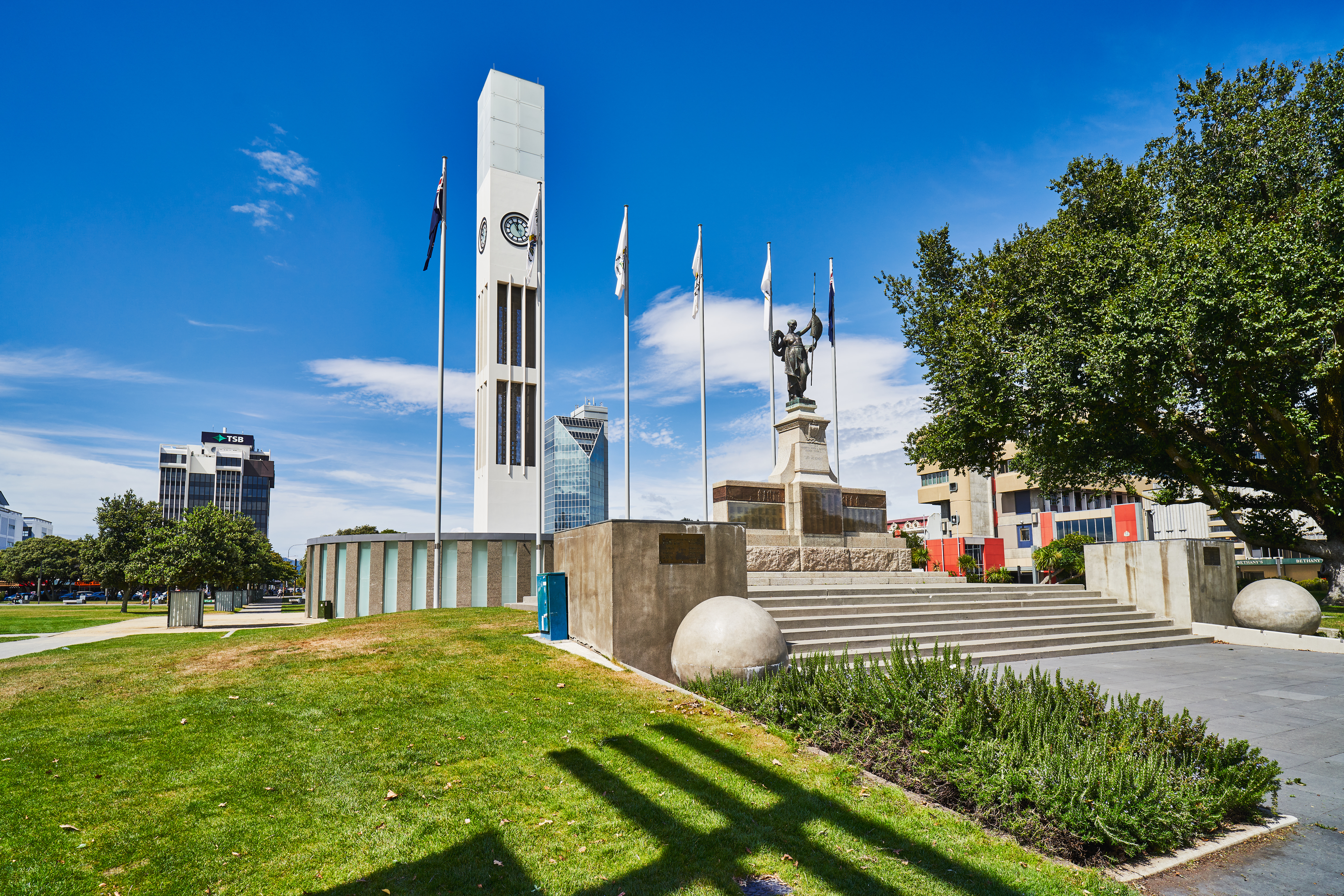
Cenotaph and Clock Tower in the centre of The Square.

In 1971, a competition to design a civic building for the vacant railway land at the Square, was won by Wellington architects, Maurice and John Patience. The resulting building was finished in 1979. In 1976, the Manawatu and Oroua rivers flooded, 24-hour rainfall records in Feilding and Palmerston North were exceeded and some residents from both locations were evacuated.

In 1977, Palmerston North City Council celebrated its Centenary of Municipal government. The Queen and the Duke of Edinburgh are among visitors to Palmerston North.

On 1 November 1989, New Zealand local government authorities were reorganised. Palmerston North City boundaries were extended to include Ashhurst, Linton and Turitea through amalgamation of parts of the former Kairanga County, Oroua County and Ashhurst Town Council.

On 1 July 2012, Bunnythorpe, Longburn, part of the area around Kairanga and an area around Ashhurst were transferred from the Manawatū District to Palmerston North City.

== Geography ==
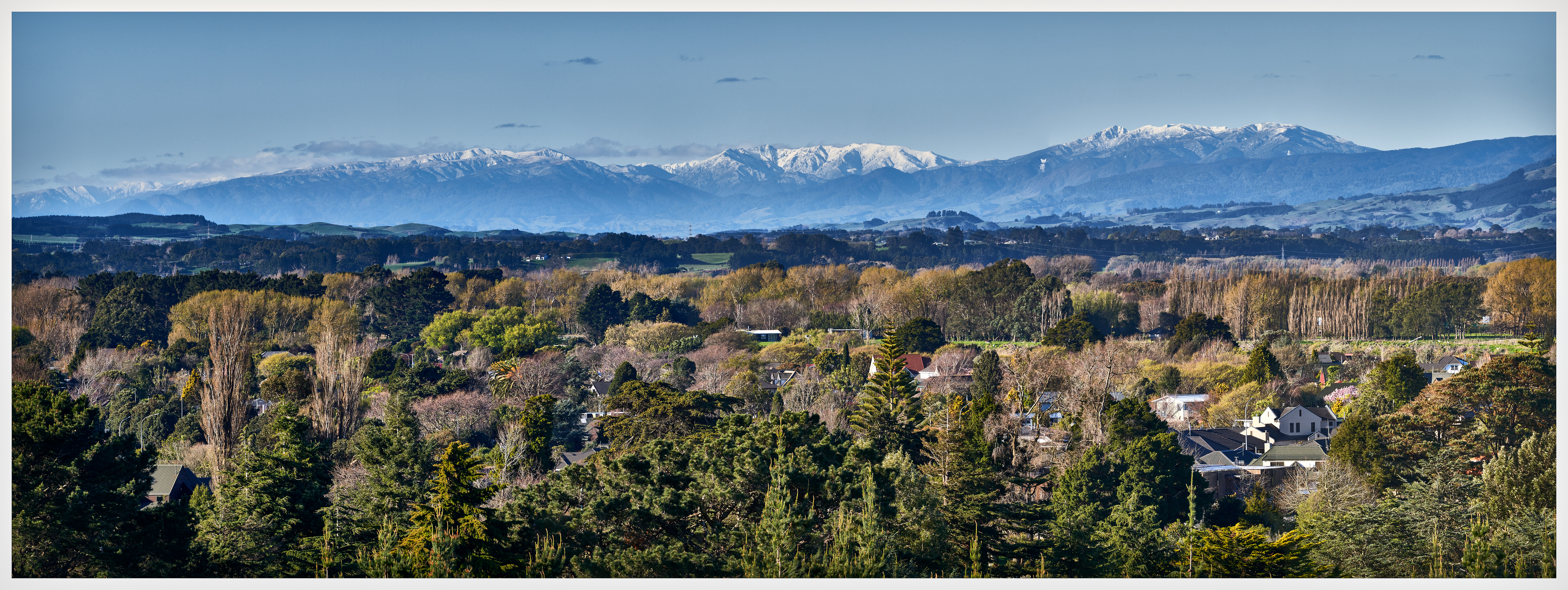
Looking northeast towards the Ruahine Range from Anzac Park.

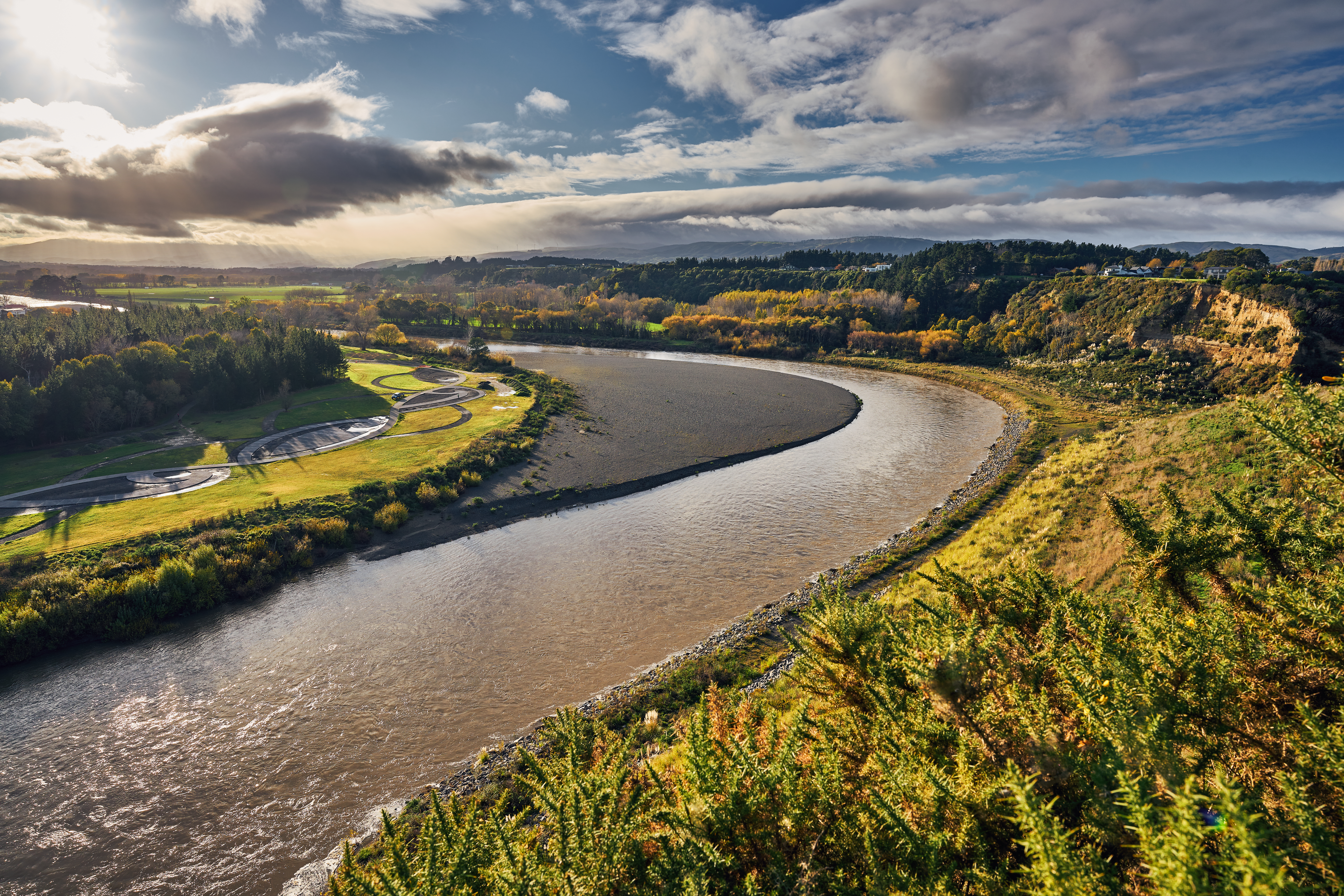
Manawatu River from Anzac Cliffs.

Although the land Palmerston North is situated on is bounded by the lofty Ruahine and Tararua ranges in the east and south respectively, the city has a predominantly flat appearance. The occasional rise in elevation occurs further away from the river and is especially pronounced in the north and northeast, and also on the south side of the river. The typical urban area elevation ranges between 20 and 40 metres (65–130 ft) above sea level.

The highest point is 760 metres (2,493 ft) above sea level. This is in the Tararua ranges, south-east of Scotts Road.

The lowest point is 10 metres (33 ft) above sea level. This is at the river bank near Te Puna Road. Incidentally, both these locations are in the south-west of the city, by Linton.

There are 5.54 square kilometres (1,369 acres) dedicated to public reserves.

The length of the Manawatū river within the city boundary is 29.9 kilometres (18.6 mi) and its tributary at Ashhurst, the Pohangina, is 2.6 kilometres (1.6 mi).

=== Administrative divisions ===
Palmerston North City consists of the following populated places (i.e.: suburbs, towns, localities, settlements, communities, hamlets, etc.):

- Aokautere
- Ashhurst
- Awapuni
- Bunnythorpe
- Cloverlea
- Fitzherbert
- Highbury
- Hokowhitu
- Kelvin Grove
- Linton
- Longburn
- Milson
- Palmerston North Central
- Papaioea
- Roslyn
- Takaro
- Terrace End
- Turitea
- West End
- Westbrook
- Whakarongo

=== Climate ===
Palmerston North's climate is temperate (Köppen Cfb), with warm summer afternoon temperatures of 20 – 22 °C (72 °F) in summer and 12 °C (54 °F) in winter. On average temperatures rise above 25 °C (77 °F) on 20 days of the year. Annual rainfall is approximately 960 mm (37.8 in) with rain occurring approximately 5% of the time. There are on average 200 rain-free days each year.

In the ranges that flank the city there is often sustained wind, especially in spring. Much of this land is within the city boundaries, and these ranges have the reputation of providing the most consistent wind in the country.

Close to the city is the largest electricity-generating series of wind farms in the southern hemisphere, with 286 turbines in the Tararua and Ruahine Ranges providing power for approximately 50,000 homes.

Climate data for Palmerston North (1991–2020 normals, extremes 1928–present)
Month	Jan	Feb	Mar	Apr	May	Jun	Jul	Aug	Sep	Oct	Nov	Dec	Year
Record high °C (°F)	32.5 (90.5)	33.0 (91.4)	31.3 (88.3)	28.4 (83.1)	25.6 (78.1)	20.9 (69.6)	19.6 (67.3)	22.8 (73.0)	22.4 (72.3)	26.2 (79.2)	28.7 (83.7)	31.7 (89.1)	33.0 (91.4)
Mean maximum °C (°F)	28.3 (82.9)	28.0 (82.4)	26.9 (80.4)	23.6 (74.5)	20.8 (69.4)	17.9 (64.2)	16.7 (62.1)	17.5 (63.5)	19.6 (67.3)	21.3 (70.3)	24.1 (75.4)	26.3 (79.3)	29.3 (84.7)
Mean daily maximum °C (°F)	22.6 (72.7)	23.2 (73.8)	21.6 (70.9)	18.7 (65.7)	16.0 (60.8)	13.5 (56.3)	12.9 (55.2)	13.8 (56.8)	15.1 (59.2)	16.5 (61.7)	18.3 (64.9)	20.9 (69.6)	17.8 (64.0)
Daily mean °C (°F)	17.9 (64.2)	18.4 (65.1)	16.7 (62.1)	14.0 (57.2)	11.7 (53.1)	9.4 (48.9)	8.8 (47.8)	9.5 (49.1)	11.0 (51.8)	12.5 (54.5)	14.0 (57.2)	16.5 (61.7)	13.4 (56.1)
Mean daily minimum °C (°F)	13.1 (55.6)	13.6 (56.5)	11.7 (53.1)	9.2 (48.6)	7.3 (45.1)	5.2 (41.4)	4.7 (40.5)	5.2 (41.4)	6.8 (44.2)	8.4 (47.1)	9.7 (49.5)	12.1 (53.8)	8.9 (48.0)
Mean minimum °C (°F)	5.8 (42.4)	7.1 (44.8)	4.5 (40.1)	1.8 (35.2)	−0.6 (30.9)	−1.6 (29.1)	−2.0 (28.4)	−1.1 (30.0)	−0.4 (31.3)	0.8 (33.4)	2.7 (36.9)	5.7 (42.3)	−2.8 (27.0)
Record low °C (°F)	0.5 (32.9)	0.0 (32.0)	−1.5 (29.3)	−3.6 (25.5)	−3.9 (25.0)	−6.9 (19.6)	−6.7 (19.9)	−6.0 (21.2)	−3.9 (25.0)	−3.6 (25.5)	−2.1 (28.2)	0.0 (32.0)	−6.9 (19.6)
Average rainfall mm (inches)	58.7 (2.31)	68.6 (2.70)	57.4 (2.26)	83.6 (3.29)	87.2 (3.43)	95.5 (3.76)	87.5 (3.44)	83.5 (3.29)	89.0 (3.50)	96.3 (3.79)	86.3 (3.40)	89.9 (3.54)	983.5 (38.71)
Average rainy days (≥ 1.0 mm)	8.2	6.8	7.3	9.1	10.4	12.0	11.6	12.7	11.8	12.4	9.9	10.2	122.4
Average relative humidity (%)	77.2	78.1	80.7	80.9	85.7	87.8	87.4	84.9	78.9	80.5	77.2	76.6	81.3
Mean monthly sunshine hours	207.3	186.5	184.1	146.3	116.0	91.3	110.9	126.1	130.4	139.1	163.4	170.3	1,771.7
Mean daily daylight hours	14.7	13.6	12.3	11.0	9.9	9.3	9.6	10.6	11.8	13.2	14.4	15.0	12.1
Percentage possible sunshine	45	49	48	44	38	33	37	38	37	34	38	37	40
Source 1: NIWA Climate Data
Source 2: Weather Spark

== Demographics ==
=== Palmerston North territorial authority ===
Palmerston North City covers 394.74 km^{2} (152.41 sq mi) and had an estimated population of 90,500 as of June 2025, with a population density of 229 people per km^{2}. This comprises 81,200 people in the Palmerston North urban area, 3,350 people in the Ashhurst urban area, and 5,950 people in the surrounding settlements and rural area.

Historical population for the territorial authority
Year	Pop.	±% p.a.
1996	76,000	—
2001	75,900	−0.03%
2006	77,727	+0.48%
2013	80,079	+0.43%
2018	84,639	+1.11%
2023	87,090	+0.57%

Palmerston North City had a population of 87,090 in the 2023 New Zealand census, an increase of 2,451 people (2.9%) since the 2018 census, and an increase of 7,011 people (8.8%) since the 2013 census. There were 42,453 males, 44,166 females and 471 people of other genders in 31,776 dwellings. 4.1% of people identified as LGBTIQ+. The median age was 35.7 years (compared with 38.1 years nationally). There were 16,899 people (19.4%) aged under 15 years, 19,401 (22.3%) aged 15 to 29, 37,125 (42.6%) aged 30 to 64, and 13,665 (15.7%) aged 65 or older.

Largest groups of overseas-born residents
Nationality	Population (2018)
England	2,748
India	1,539
China	1,440
Australia	1,155
South Africa	903
Philippines	693
Fiji	528
United States	468
Samoa	441
Malaysia	390

People could identify as more than one ethnicity. The results were 73.8% European (Pākehā); 20.7% Māori; 5.9% Pasifika; 14.4% Asian; 1.7% Middle Eastern, Latin American and African New Zealanders (MELAA); and 2.4% other, which includes people giving their ethnicity as "New Zealander". English was spoken by 95.7%, Māori language by 5.0%, Samoan by 1.0% and other languages by 14.2%. No language could be spoken by 2.2% (e.g. too young to talk). New Zealand Sign Language was known by 0.9%. The percentage of people born overseas was 21.8, compared with 28.8% nationally.

Religious affiliations were 31.9% Christian, 2.2% Hindu, 1.8% Islam, 1.1% Māori religious beliefs, 1.1% Buddhist, 0.5% New Age, 0.1% Jewish, and 1.6% other religions. People who answered that they had no religion were 52.8%, and 7.0% of people did not answer the census question.

Of those at least 15 years old, 13,860 (19.7%) people had a bachelor's or higher degree, 37,113 (52.9%) had a post-high school certificate or diploma, and 15,489 (22.1%) people exclusively held high school qualifications. The median income was $40,800, compared with $41,500 nationally. 6,591 people (9.4%) earned over $100,000 compared to 12.1% nationally. The employment status of those at least 15 was that 35,859 (51.1%) people were employed full-time, 9,570 (13.6%) were part-time, and 2,154 (3.1%) were unemployed.

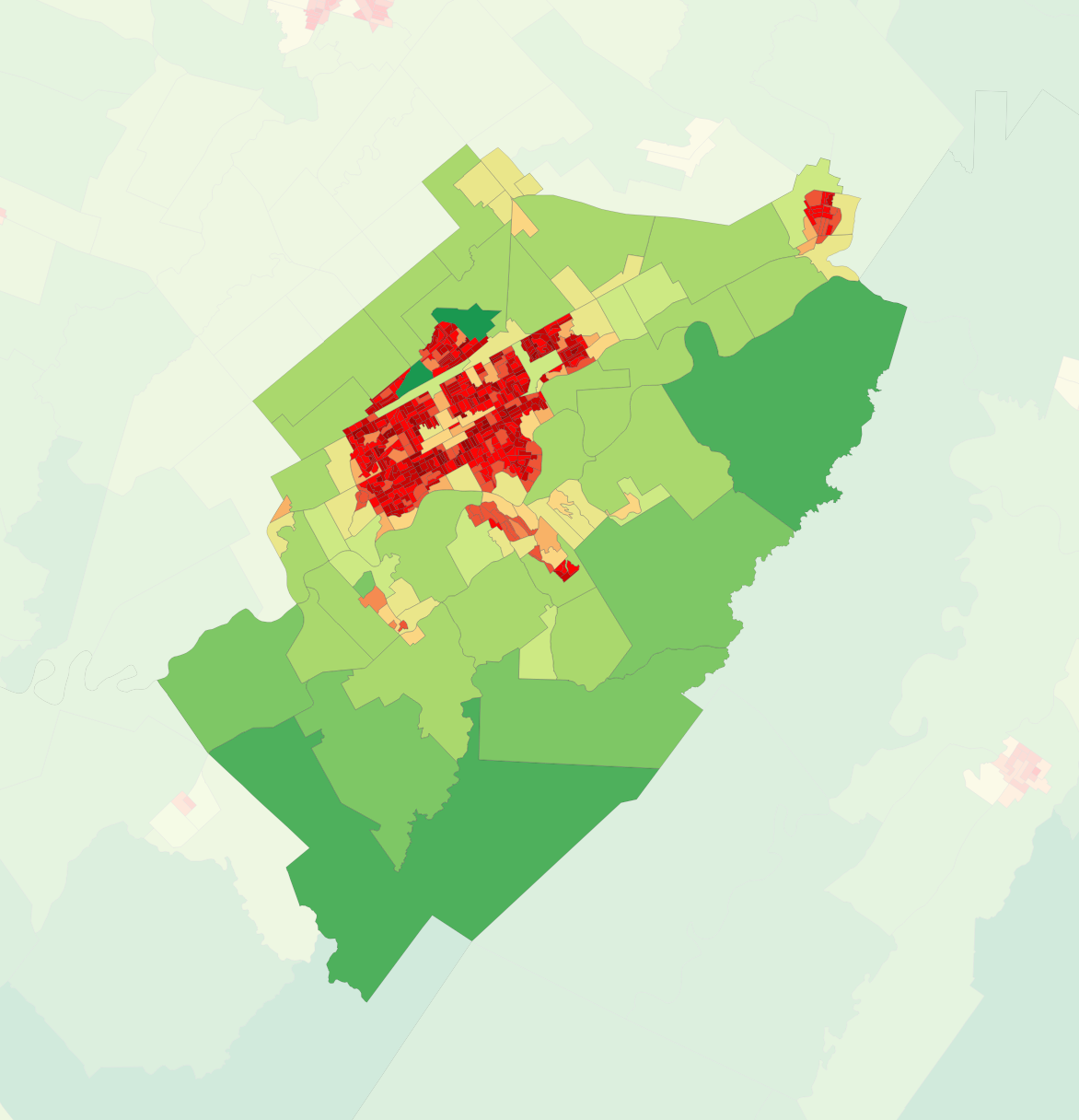
Population density in the 2023 census

=== Palmerston North urban area ===
Palmerston North's urban area covers 77.05 km^{2} (29.75 sq mi) and had an estimated population of 81,200 as of June 2025, with a population density of 1,054 people per km^{2}.

Historical population for the urban area
Year	Pop.	±% p.a.
2013	72,345	—
2018	76,281	+1.07%
2023	78,021	+0.45%

The urban area had a population of 78,021 in the 2023 New Zealand census, an increase of 1,740 people (2.3%) since the 2018 census, and an increase of 5,676 people (7.8%) since the 2013 census. There were 37,860 males, 39,717 females and 441 people of other genders in 28,620 dwellings. 4.3% of people identified as LGBTIQ+. The median age was 35.3 years (compared with 38.1 years nationally). There were 14,958 people (19.2%) aged under 15 years, 17,955 (23.0%) aged 15 to 29, 32,868 (42.1%) aged 30 to 64, and 12,243 (15.7%) aged 65 or older.

People could identify as more than one ethnicity. The results were 72.1% European (Pākehā); 21.1% Māori; 6.3% Pasifika; 15.5% Asian; 1.8% Middle Eastern, Latin American and African New Zealanders (MELAA); and 2.3% other, which includes people giving their ethnicity as "New Zealander". English was spoken by 95.5%, Māori language by 5.2%, Samoan by 1.0% and other languages by 15.0%. No language could be spoken by 2.2% (e.g. too young to talk). New Zealand Sign Language was known by 0.9%. The percentage of people born overseas was 22.7, compared with 28.8% nationally.

Religious affiliations were 31.9% Christian, 2.4% Hindu, 2.0% Islam, 1.2% Māori religious beliefs, 1.2% Buddhist, 0.5% New Age, 0.1% Jewish, and 1.7% other religions. People who answered that they had no religion were 52.3%, and 6.9% of people did not answer the census question.

Of those at least 15 years old, 12,585 (20.0%) people had a bachelor's or higher degree, 33,063 (52.4%) had a post-high school certificate or diploma, and 14,070 (22.3%) people exclusively held high school qualifications. The median income was $39,900, compared with $41,500 nationally. 5,601 people (8.9%) earned over $100,000 compared to 12.1% nationally. The employment status of those at least 15 was that 31,872 (50.5%) people were employed full-time, 8,481 (13.4%) were part-time, and 2,007 (3.2%) were unemployed.

== Governance ==
=== Palmerston North City Council ===
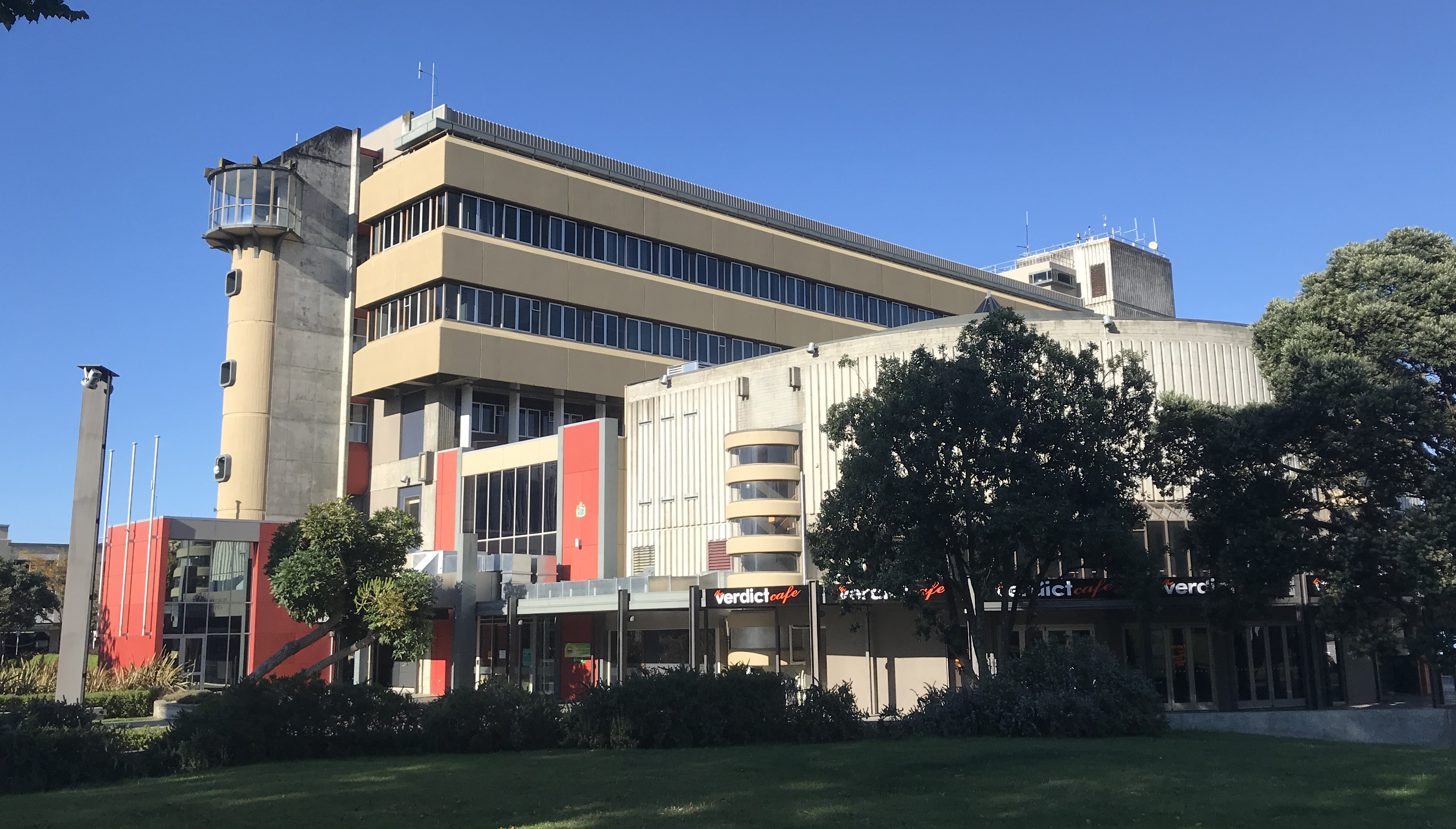
Palmerston North Civic Administration Building

Palmerston North is governed by a city council consisting of the Mayor and 15 councillors, elected on a citywide basis.

In 2017 the Council voted to create a Māori ward, but the decision was overturned by a city-wide referendum in May 2018.

In 2021, Palmerston North City Council decided to establish Māori and general wards under the Local Electoral (Māori Wards and Māori Constituencies) Amendment Act 2021. Starting in 2022, there is a Māori ward called Te Pūao Ward, with two councillors; and a general ward called Te Hirawanui Ward, with 13 councillors.

Before the 2016 election councillors were elected representing one of five city wards, but Palmerston North's electoral wards were abolished by the Local Government Commission in 2013. The 2013 election also saw the single transferable vote (STV) system introduced, replacing first past the post (FPP).

Name	Affiliation (if any)	Notes
Grant Smith	Independent	Mayor of Palmerston North
Debi Marshall-Lobb	Independent	Deputy Mayor
Brent Barrett	Green Party	Councillor
Roly Fitzgerald	Independent	Councillor
Rachel Bowen	Independent	Councillor
Mark Arnott	Independent	Councillor
Vaughan Dennison	Independent	Councillor
Kaydee Zabelin	Green Party	Councillor
Lew Findlay	Independent	Councillor
Pat Handcock	Independent	Councillor
Leonie Hapeta	Independent	Councillor
Lorna Johnson	Labour Party	Councillor
Billy Meehan	Independent	Councillor
Orphée Mickalad	Independent	Councillor
Karen Naylor	Independent	Councillor
William Wood	Independent	Councillor

The council's functions are broken down into six units: Planning, Customer, Finance, People & Performance, Infrastructure, and Chief Executive.

The Chief Executive is Waid Crockett, who replaced Heather Shotter in 2022.

=== Horizons (Manawatū-Whanganui) Regional Council ===
Palmerston North is the seat of the council.

For electoral and regional representation purposes, Palmerston North City constitutes the Palmerston North constituency and is represented by 4 councillors.

=== Central governance ===
Palmerston North is covered by two general electorates and one Māori electorate.

The Palmerston North electorate covers the Palmerston North urban area north of the Manawatū River. The Rangitīkei electorate covers the remainder of the territorial authority, including the Palmerston North urban area south of the Manawatū River. Since the 2023 general election, the electorates have been held by Tangi Utikere of the Labour Party and Suze Redmayne of the National Party respectively. The Te Tai Hauaūru Māori electorate, held by Debbie Ngarewa-Packer of the Te Pāti Māori Party, covers Palmerston North.

=== Justice ===
The Palmerston North Courthouse in Main Street (east) is a combined District and High Court and serves the city and surrounding area.

== Economy ==
Palmerston North has a modelled gross domestic product (GDP) of $8,041 million in the year to March 2024, 1.9% of New Zealand's national GDP. The GDP per capita was $87,899, the sixth-highest of all territorial authorities. Major sectors include wholesale trade, professional, scientific and technical services, public administration and safety, health care and social assistance, and education and training.

According to the 2023 census, around 51,800 people worked in Palmerston North. The largest industries were health care and social assistance (6,654 people, 12.8%), public administration and safety (5,961 people, 10.1%), education and training (5,520 people, 10.7%), retail trade (4,743 people, 9.2%), and manufacturing (4.572 people, 8.8%).

The tertiary education sector provides NZ$500 million a year to the local economy and the education sector accounted for 11.3% of the Palmerston North workforce in February 2006.

Palmerston North has economic strengths in research, especially in the bio-industry, defence, distribution and smart business sectors. The city is home to more than 70 major educational and research institutions, including New Zealand's fastest expanding university, Massey University; the Massey University Sport and Recreation Institute at the Massey University campus, Turitea; Universal College of Learning (UCOL) and Linton Army Camp.

=== Business innovation ===
Palmerston North has a long history of innovation in the business sector. A number of firms founded in or near the city have become nationally or internationally renowned.

Companies with national head offices currently or previously based in Palmerston North include:

- FMG Insurance
- Greentech Robotics
- Higgins Group
- Hino Distributors (NZ) Ltd
- Hunting and Fishing New Zealand. Andy Tannock opened the first Hunting & Fishing New Zealand store in Palmerston North in 1986.
- Motor Truck Distributors (NZ) Ltd (National distributors of Mack, Renault and Volvo Trucks & Buses). Ron Carpenter, the owner of Palmerston North Motors, which became Motor Truck Distributors, brought the Mack brand to New Zealand when the Government removed import licensing in 1972. In 2013 the company became Sime Darby Commercial (NZ) Ltd.
- New Zealand Pharmaceuticals Limited
- Norwood Distributors Ltd
- OBO
- Plumbing World Limited
- Steelfort Engineering Limited
- Toyota New Zealand
- Truck Stops (NZ) Ltd

In July 2025 it was reported there are over 120 technology companies in the region.

=== Ezibuy ===
The well-known retailer EziBuy was established in Palmerston North in 1978 by brothers Peter and Gerard Gillespie and operated successfully for many years. The Gillespies sold the business to Woolworths Group in 2013 when it was the largest fashion and homeware multi-channel retailer in Australasia, mailing over 23 million catalogues and processing more than 1.75 million orders annually. After a number of subsequent changes of ownership the business was put into liquidation in July 2023 with creditors owed more than $100 million.

=== Glaxo ===
One of the largest and well known businesses to have started in the region is GSK (GlaxoSmithKline). Glaxo had its beginnings in Bunnythorpe, now a part of Palmerston North.

== Amenities and attractions ==
Palmerston North has a number of facilities and attractions. It is also the gateway to attractions in other parts of the region, such as Tongariro National Park, Ruahine and Tararua Ranges. When Palmerston North Airport serviced international flights, the city was also an international gateway to Hawke's Bay, Whanganui and Taranaki.

=== Retail ===
The Plaza Shopping Centre is the largest shopping mall in the Manawatū-Whanganui region and a key shopping centre in the lower North Island, boasting over 100 stores. The mall was originally developed by the Premier Drapery Company (PDC) department store and opened in 1986 as the PDC Plaza. After PDC went into receivership in 1988, the mall was sold and assumed its current name in 1990. The shopping centre underwent refurbishment and expansion between 2008 and 2010.

Downtown on Broadway combines retail and boutique shopping and Event Cinemas.

=== The Square ===
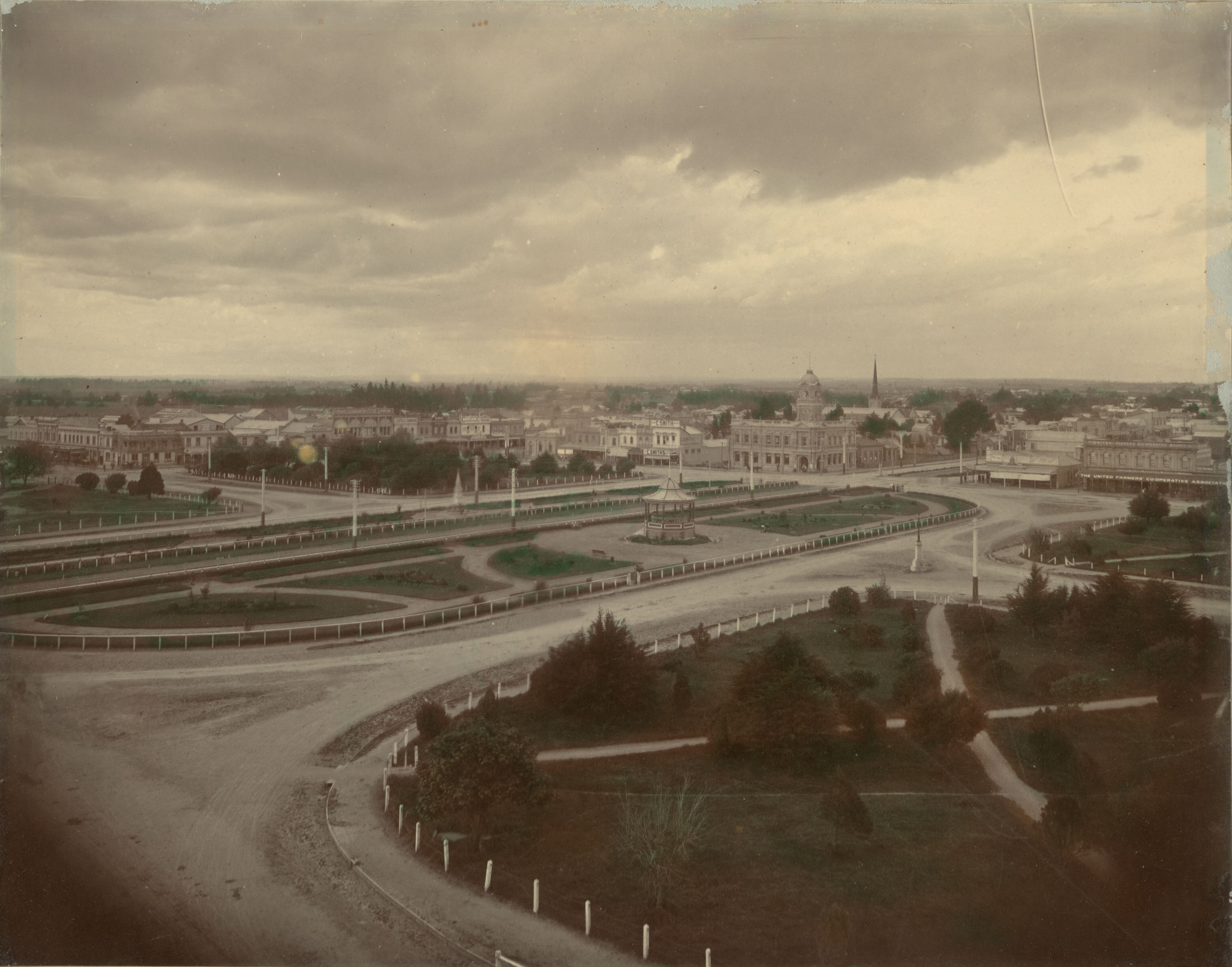
The Square in 1908 with the railway line running through the middle

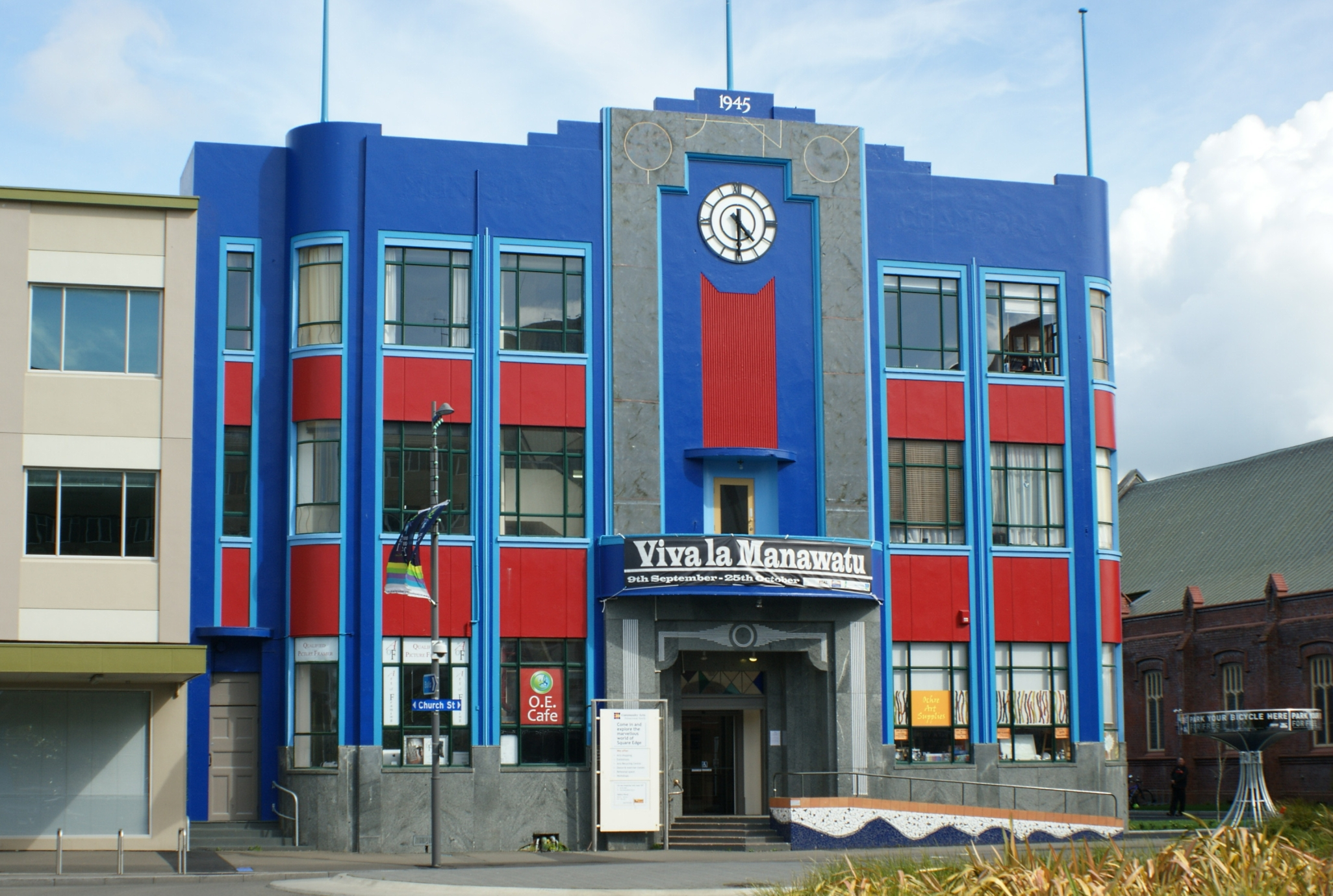
Palmerston North, Square Edge

Originally part of the Papaioea clearing, The Square is a seven-hectare park of lawn, trees, lakes, fountains, and gardens in the centre of the city. It is the city's original park and also the centrepoint from whence the city's main streets are arranged.

The Square contains the city's war memorial and a memorial dedicated to Te Peeti Te Aweawe, the Rangitāne chief instrumental in the sale of Palmerston North district to the government in 1865. Near the centre of the park is the Hopwood Clock Tower with its illuminated cross and coloured lights. Also here is the city's iSite, the Civic Building (seat of the City Council), the City Library, Square Edge and the commercial heart of Palmerston North's CBD. Retail stores (including the Plaza) and eateries line the road surrounding the park.

In around 1878, a Māori contingent, including Te Aweawe, gathered together to choose a Māori name for The Square. They chose Te Marae o Hine, meaning "The Courtyard of the Daughter of Peace". This name reflected their hope that all people of all races would live together in enduring peace.

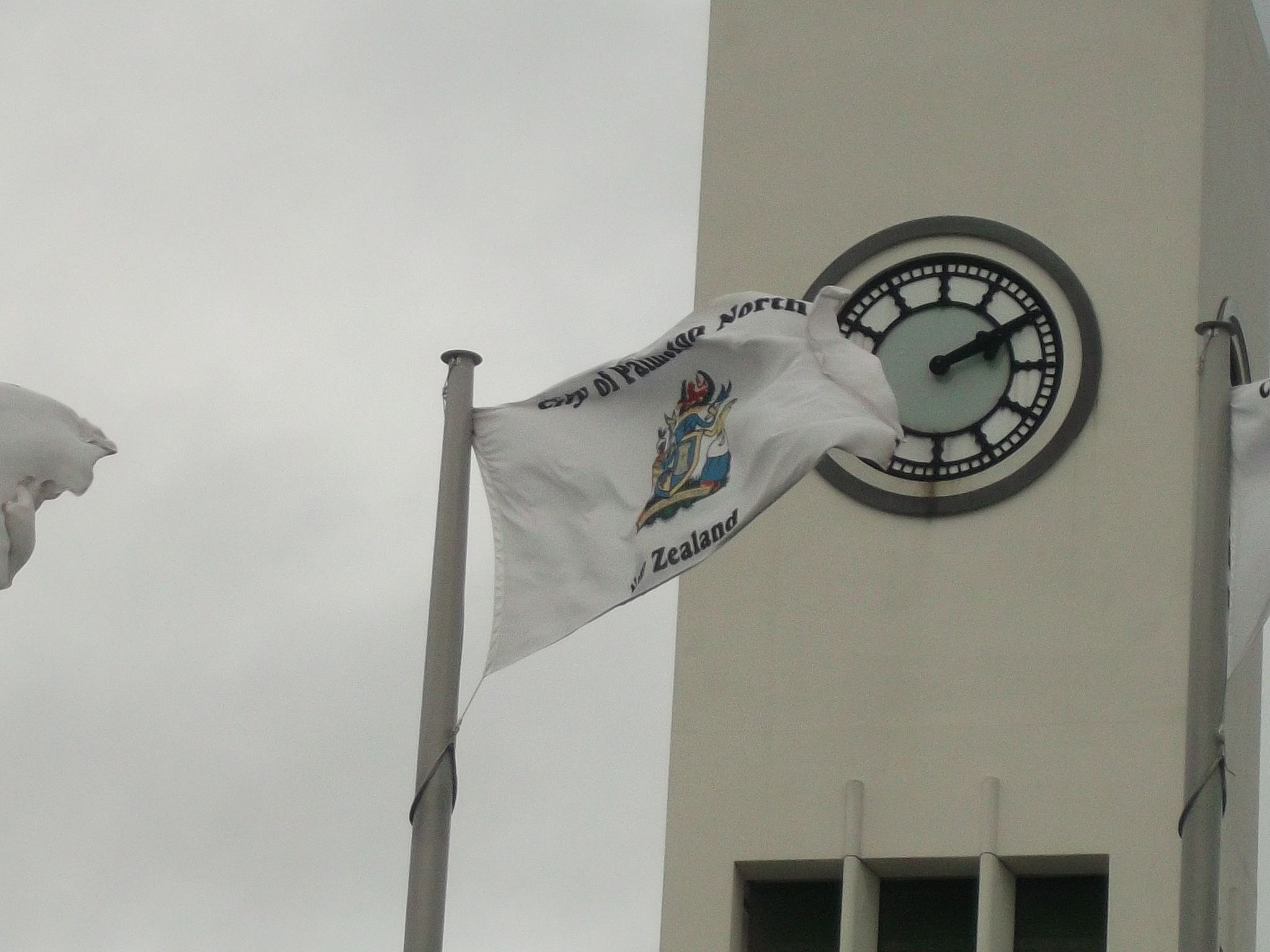
Palmerston North flag in front of the Clock Tower, The Square

=== Parks and recreational facilities ===
Palmerston North and its surroundings feature roughly 100 parks and reserves.

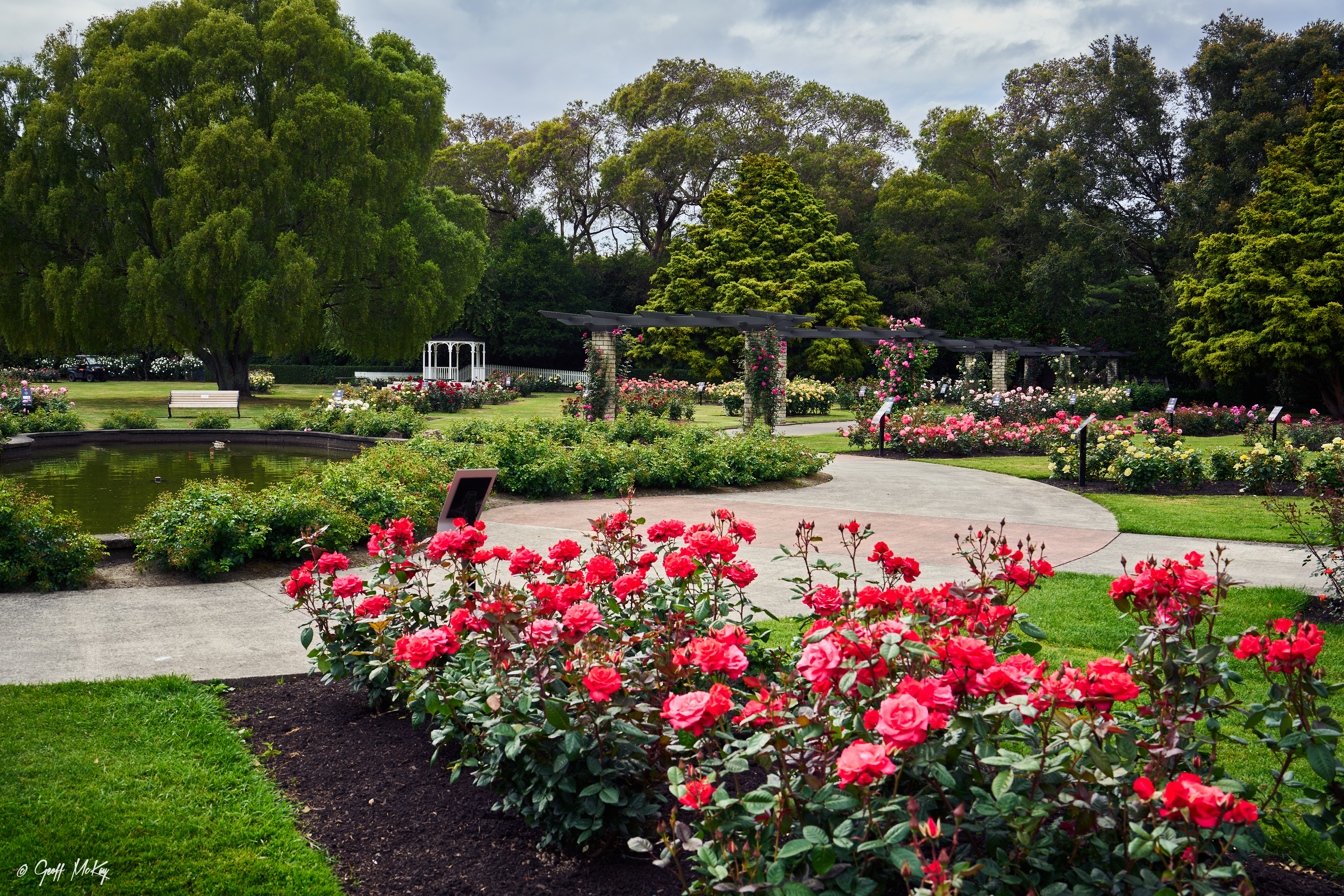
Dugald McKenzie Rose Garden, Victoria Esplanade.

Most notable is Victoria Esplanade, a 26-hectare (64-acre) park located along the northern bank of the Manawatū River west of Fitzherbert Avenue. It was opened in 1897 to commemorate the 60th Jubilee of Queen Victoria's reign, and includes a native bush reserve along the river bank, formal botanical gardens, playgrounds and the Café Esplanade, all connected with walking and bicycle tracks. Located within the Esplanade are several attractions. The Peter Black Conservatory is a large tropical greenhouse built in 1941 and refurbished in 2014. The Wildbase Recovery visitor centre and aviary for recovering wildlife opened in 2019 and is run in partnership with Massey University's Veterinary Hospital. The volunteer-operated Esplanade Scenic Railway features a 2.2 km (1.4 mi) miniature railway track offering 20-minute rides through native bush. New Zealand's largest rose garden, the 1.7-hectare (4.2-acre) Dugald McKenzie Rose Garden, is the site of the New Zealand international rose trials and contributed to the city's one-time nickname, "Rose City". It was recognised in 2003 by the World Federation of Rose Societies as one of the finest rose gardens in the world.

Adjacent to the Esplanade are the multi-sport playing fields of Ongley and Manawaroa Parks, the twin turf hockey fields and Fitzherbert Park, the premier cricket ground.

Elsewhere in the city are parks for sports like rugby, such as Coronation Park, Bill Brown Park and Colquhoun Park (also used for softball/baseball); and football: Skoglund Park (home of the Central Football Federation) and Celaeno Park. The Hokowhitu Lagoon is also located nearby the Esplanade and is a popular site for recreational kayaking and canoeing.

The Lido Aquatic Centre is Palmerston North's largest aquatic centre. Freyberg Community Pool is an all-year indoor swimming pool complex located next to Freyberg High School in Roslyn.

Memorial Park has a splash pad, pool, playground, football pitch and a duck pond, within easy reach of the city centre.

==== Riverbank development ====
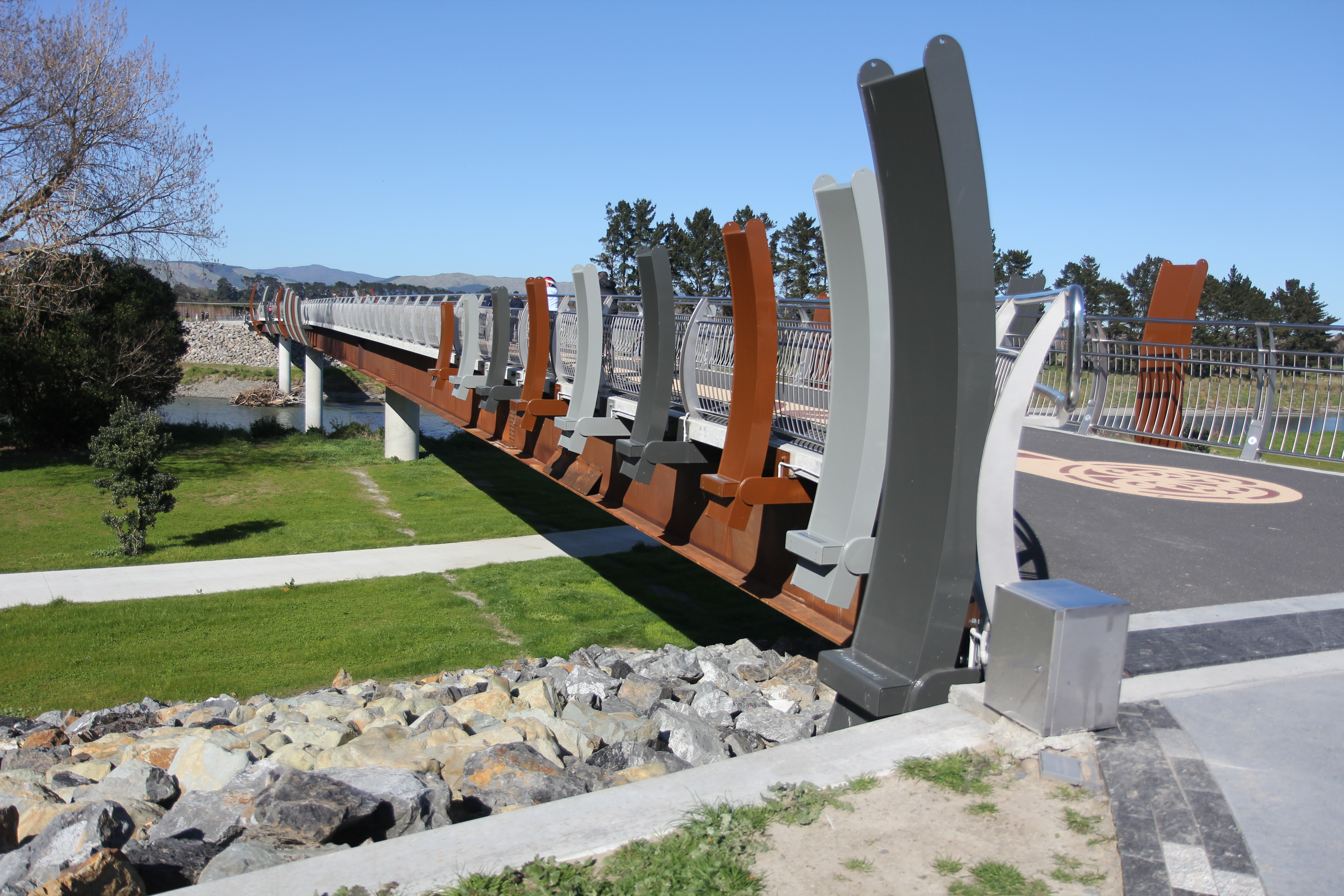
He Ara Kotahi Bridge.

The city council since 2012 has been beautifying the banks of the Manawatū River, opening up previously neglected areas into more accessible recreational parks and reserves. Part of this development is He Ara Kotahi, a 7.1 km (4.4 mi) pedestrian and cycle track that connects the city to Massey University, adjacent research institutes and Linton Military Camp, all located on the south side of the Manawatū River. The opening in 2019 included the opening of Palmerston North's second bridge, a 194-metre (636 ft) pedestrian bridge connecting the Holiday Park on Dittmer Drive to the track across the river. As well as a recreational asset, He Ara Kotahi was designed to be a pedestrian and cycle commuter route between the city bridge and Massey University, to improve safety and relieve vehicle traffic volumes on the Fitzherbert Bridge. The remainder of the track to Linton crosses tributary streams with boardwalks and four smaller bridges.

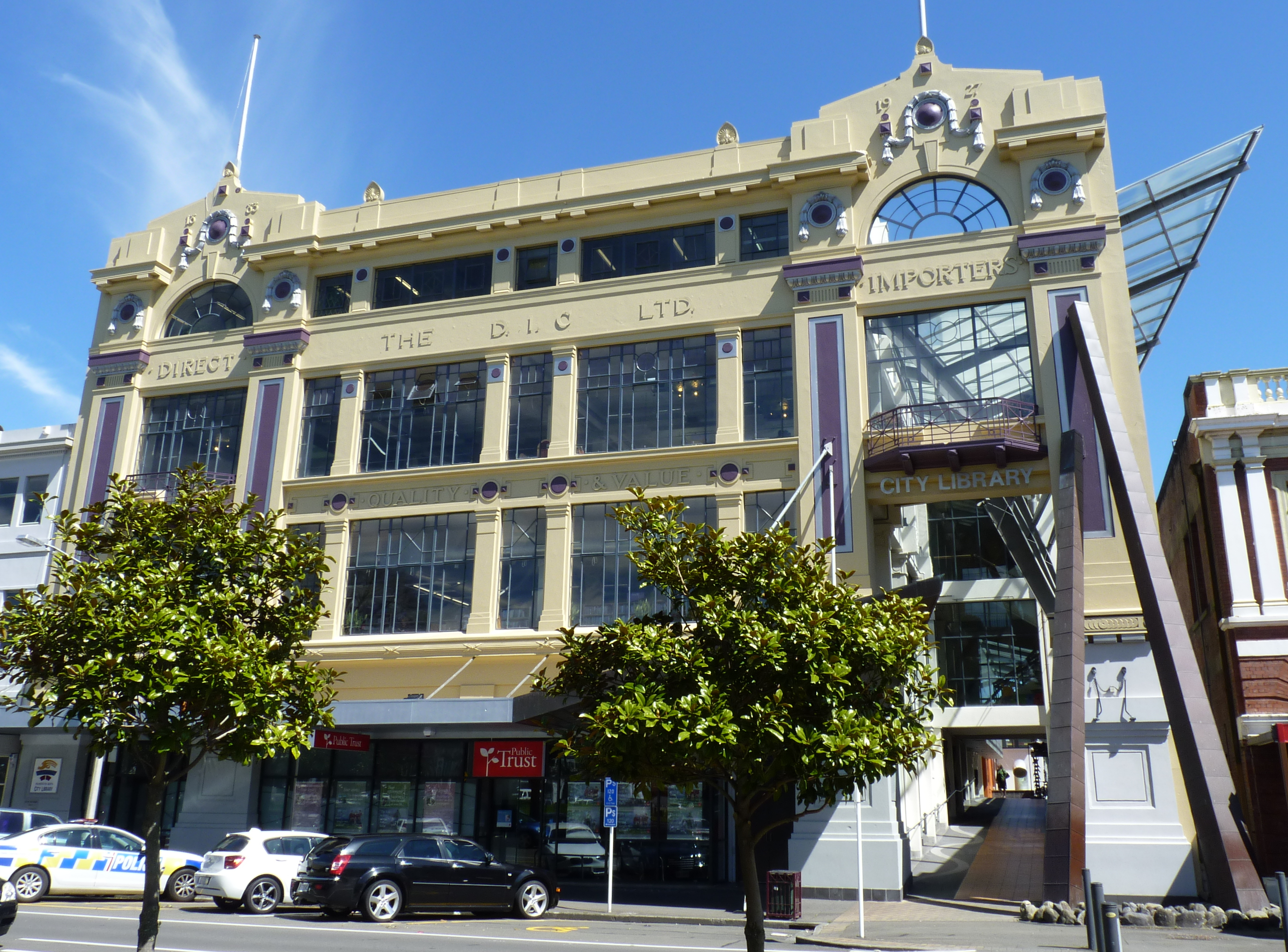
Palmerston North City Library

=== Libraries ===
Palmerston North has a main public library with five branches and one mobile library. The central Palmerston North Library is located in the Square and houses the main collections. The other four are located in Ashhurst, Awapuni, Linton, Roslyn and Te Pātikitiki (Highbury).

==== Youth Space ====
Near the Square is the Youth Space, which opened in September 2011 as a dedicated place for Palmerston North's many young people to congregate in a safe environment. Youth space is free to all, and provides table-tennis, gaming consoles, musical instruments, library books, iPads, a kitchen, and other services.

=== Culture ===
==== Arts ====
Te Manawa is the cultural museum of art, science and history. Attached to Te Manawa is the New Zealand Rugby Museum. There are many small independent galleries. Many of New Zealand's best-known artists came from or live in Palmerston North. The list includes Rita Angus, John Bevan Ford, Shane Cotton, Paul Dibble, Pat Hanly, Brent Harris, Bob Jahnke, John Panting, Carl Sydow and Tim Wilson. Palmerston North's first artist in residence was Hinerangitoariari in 1992.

==== Performing arts ====
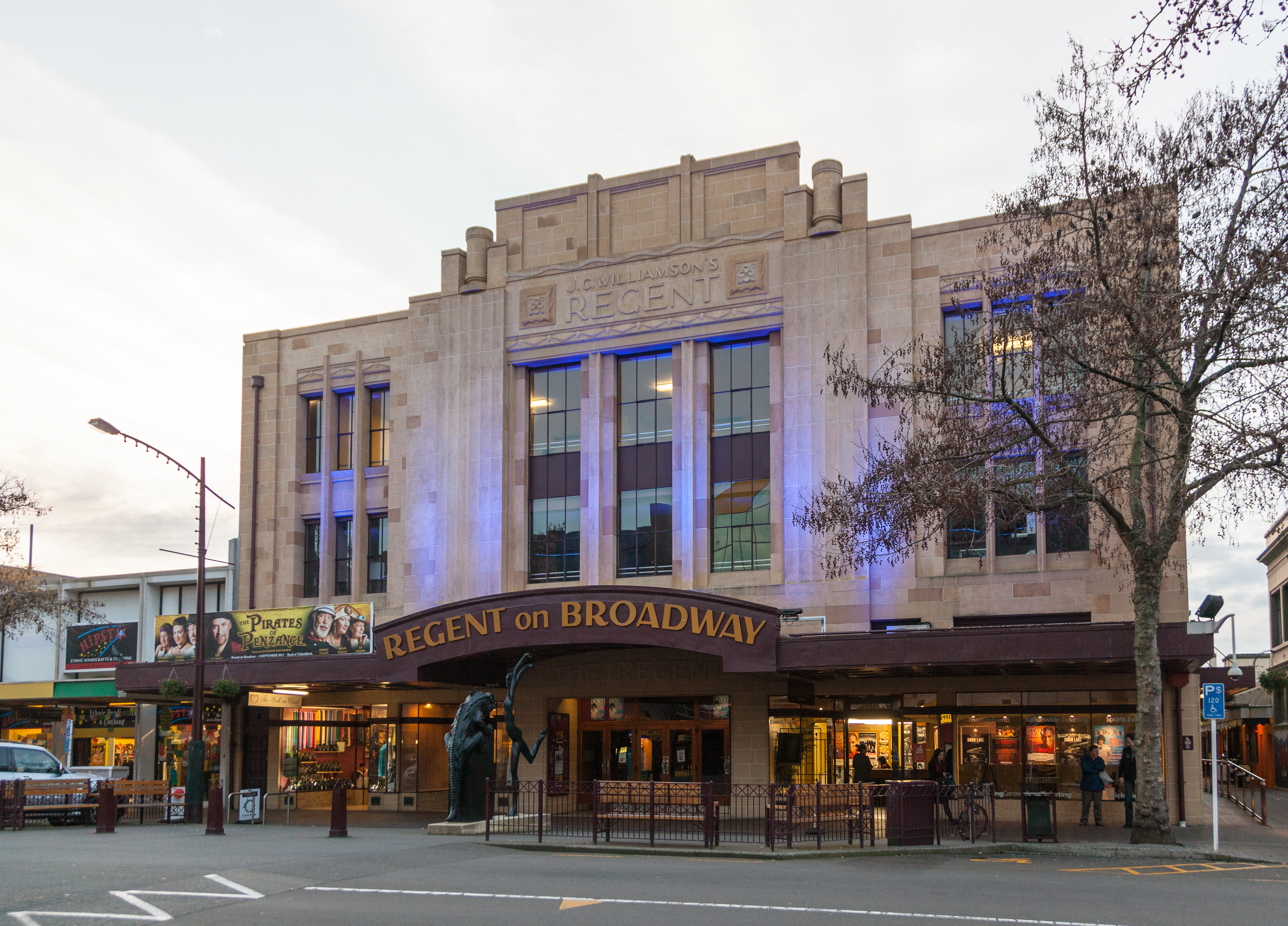
Regent On Broadway

Palmerston North houses multiple theatres which regularly host musical performances, theatrical plays and formal events. These theatres include

- Regent on Broadway Theatre is a 1393-seat multipurpose performing arts facility.
- Centrepoint Theatre is a prominent professional theatre and the only one outside the main centres of New Zealand.
- Globe Theatre is a small community theatre of around 200 seats, opened in November 1982 as a partnership between the City Council and the Manawatu Theatre Society: both parties contributed capital funds to enable the building to be constructed. The building was designed by local architect, Brian Elliot, who returned to design the Theatre's major redevelopments in 2014, with the addition of a second auditorium and an extension to the foyer and café/bar area. The redevelopment won a New Zealand Architecture Award for Elliot's work.

Top comics including John Clarke, Jeremy Corbett, Tom Scott all come from Palmerston North as do stage, television and film performers Shane Cortese and Alison Quigan and drag performer Spankie Jackzon.

==== Music ====
Palmerston North has a thriving musical scene, with many national and international acts touring through the town, and many local acts performing regularly.

Local groups include the Manawatu Sinfonia and Manawatu Youth Orchestra (MYO) who perform throughout the year. The Manawatu Youth Orchestra celebrated its 50th year in September 2011.

Palmerston North is also home to the Palmerston North Brass Band. Founded in 1868 by army troops stationed in the region, the Palmerston North Brass Band technically pre-dates the city of Palmerston North. In 2018, the band celebrated its 150th anniversary.

==== Religion ====
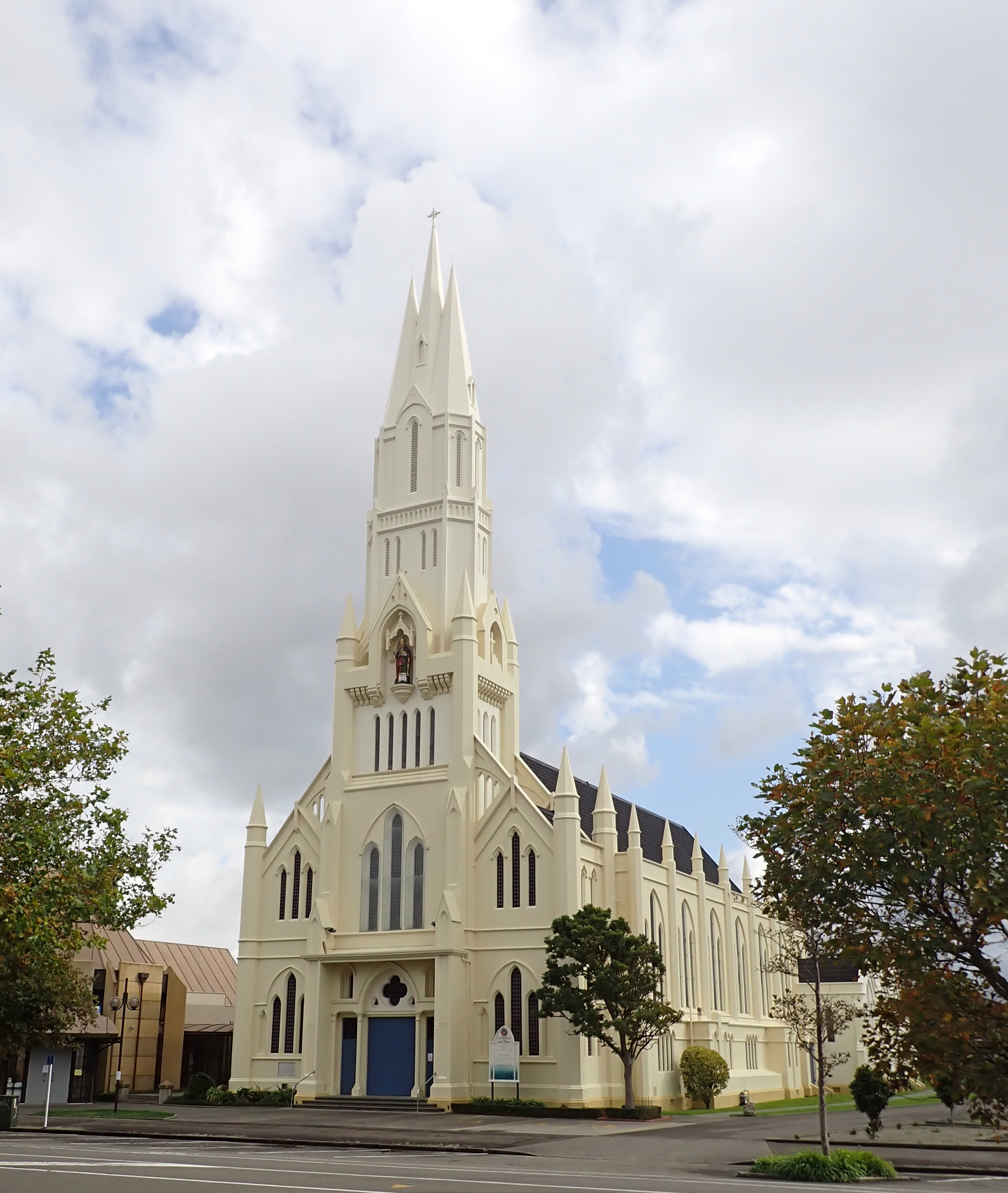
Cathedral of the Holy Spirit, Palmerston North

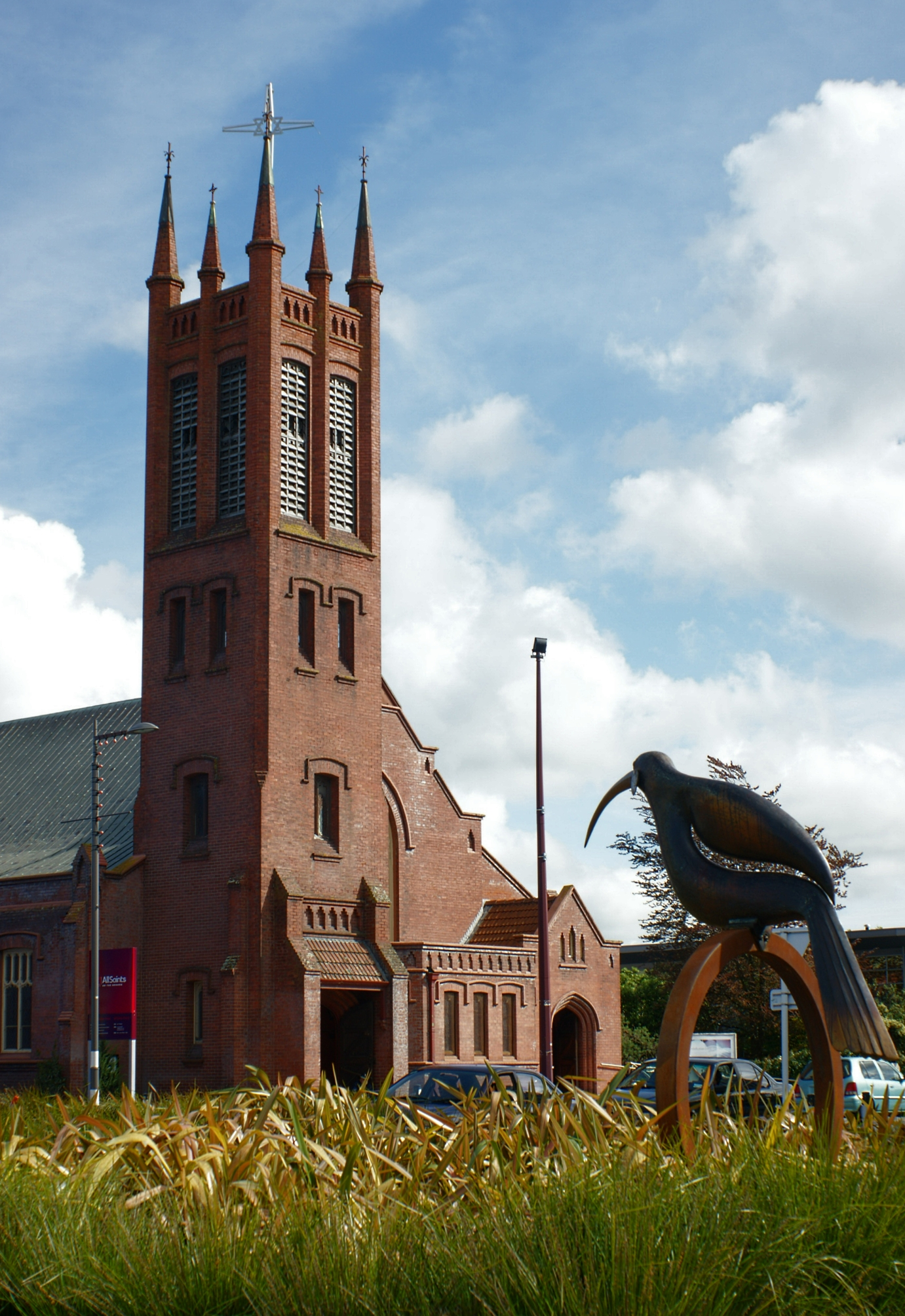
All Saints Anglican Church, Palmerston North (c.1914)

Palmerston North is a cathedral city, and the seat of the Roman Catholic Diocese of Palmerston North. The Cathedral of the Holy Spirit, Palmerston North is its cathedral. The Diocese of Palmerston North is led by Bishop John Adams, who was consecrated in September 2023.

In the Anglican Communion, Palmerston North is under the jurisdiction of the Diocese of Wellington, under Bishop Justin Duckworth. Palmerston North is also in the Anglican Hui Amorangi of Te Pīhopatanga o Te Upoko o Te Ika, under current Pīhopa Rev. Muru Walters.

There are also many other churches with denominations such as Adventist (Mosaic Community Church and Palmerston North Seventh Day Adventist Church), Apostolic, Assembly of God (AOG), Baptist, Brethren, Christian Scientist, Church of Christ, Church of Jesus Christ of Latter-day Saints, Jehovah's Witnesses, Lutheran, Methodist, Pentecostal, Presbyterian and Religious Society of Friends.

There are Sikh gurdwara near the CBD and in Awapuni. There are Islamic centres in Milson and West End, and an Islamic prayer centre at Massey University.

== Sport ==
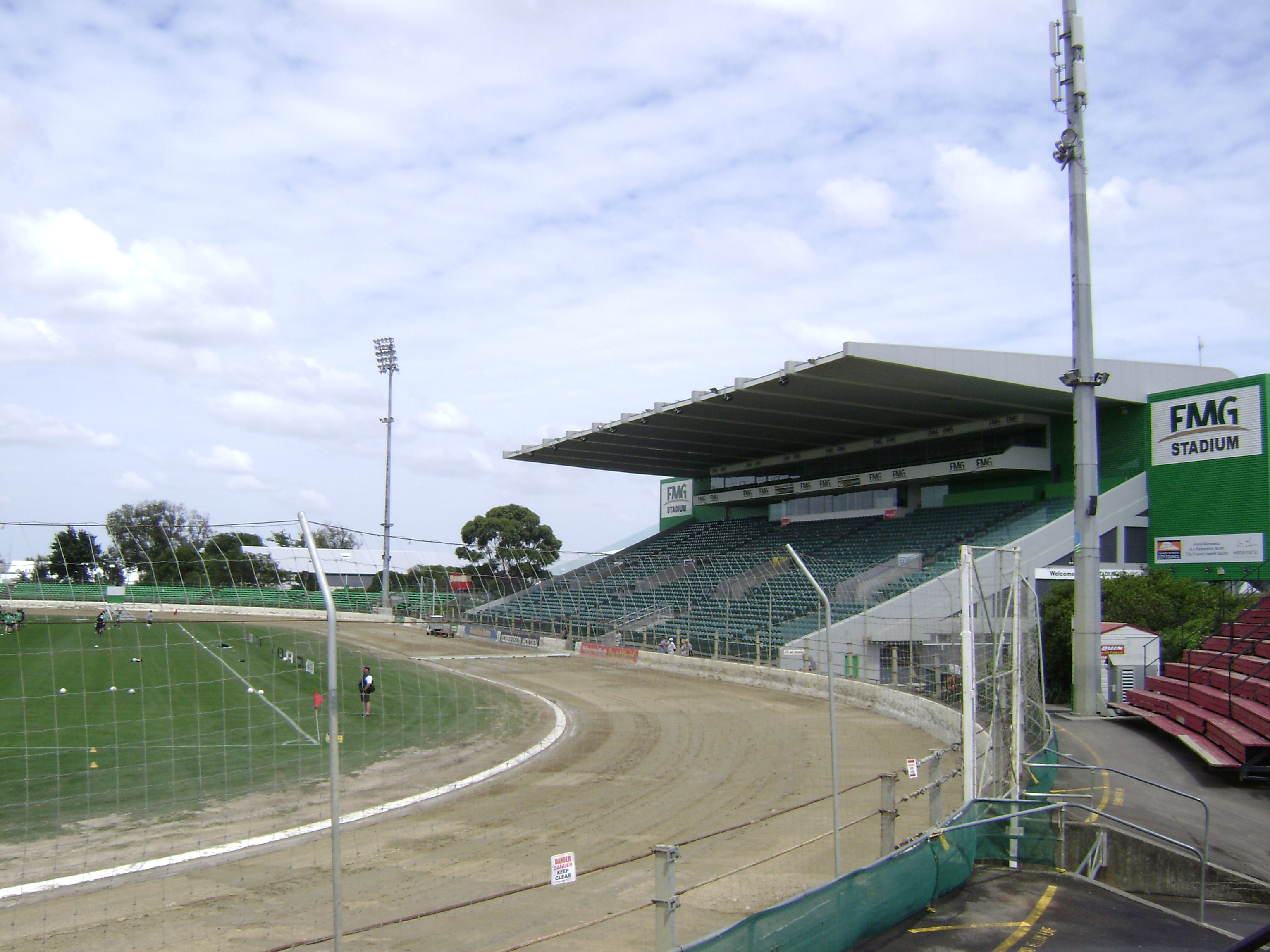
Arena Manawatu

Participation in sport is an important and popular pastime in Palmerston North. Representation at a national level is predominantly provincial-based, meaning most sports teams representing Palmerston North also draw their players from other towns from around Manawatu.

The premier multi-sports venue in Palmerston North is Arena Manawatu, which is known as the Central Energy Trust Arena after its headline sponsors. The main stadium (Arena One) is the home of the Manawatu Turbos rugby union team and the Robertson Holden International Speedway. There are indoor venues at Arena Manawatu were netball, basketball, volleyball and Badminton are played.

Other important venues include Memorial Park, Fitzherbert Park, Celaeno Park, Manawaroa/Ongley Park, Skoglund Park, Vautier Park and Massey University sports fields.

Club	Sport	League	Venue
Manawatu Turbos	Rugby union	Bunnings NPC	CET Arena
Manawatu Cyclones	Rugby union	Farah Palmer Cup	CET Arena
Hurricanes	Rugby union	Super Rugby	CET Arena #
Central Pulse	Netball	ANZ Championship	Fly Palmy Arena
Central Districts	Cricket	Plunket Shield, Ford Trophy, T20	Fitzherbert Park#
Manawatu Jets	Basketball	NBL	Fly Palmy Arena

- # : not based in Manawatu, however, home ground when playing in Manawatu.

== Infrastructure and services ==
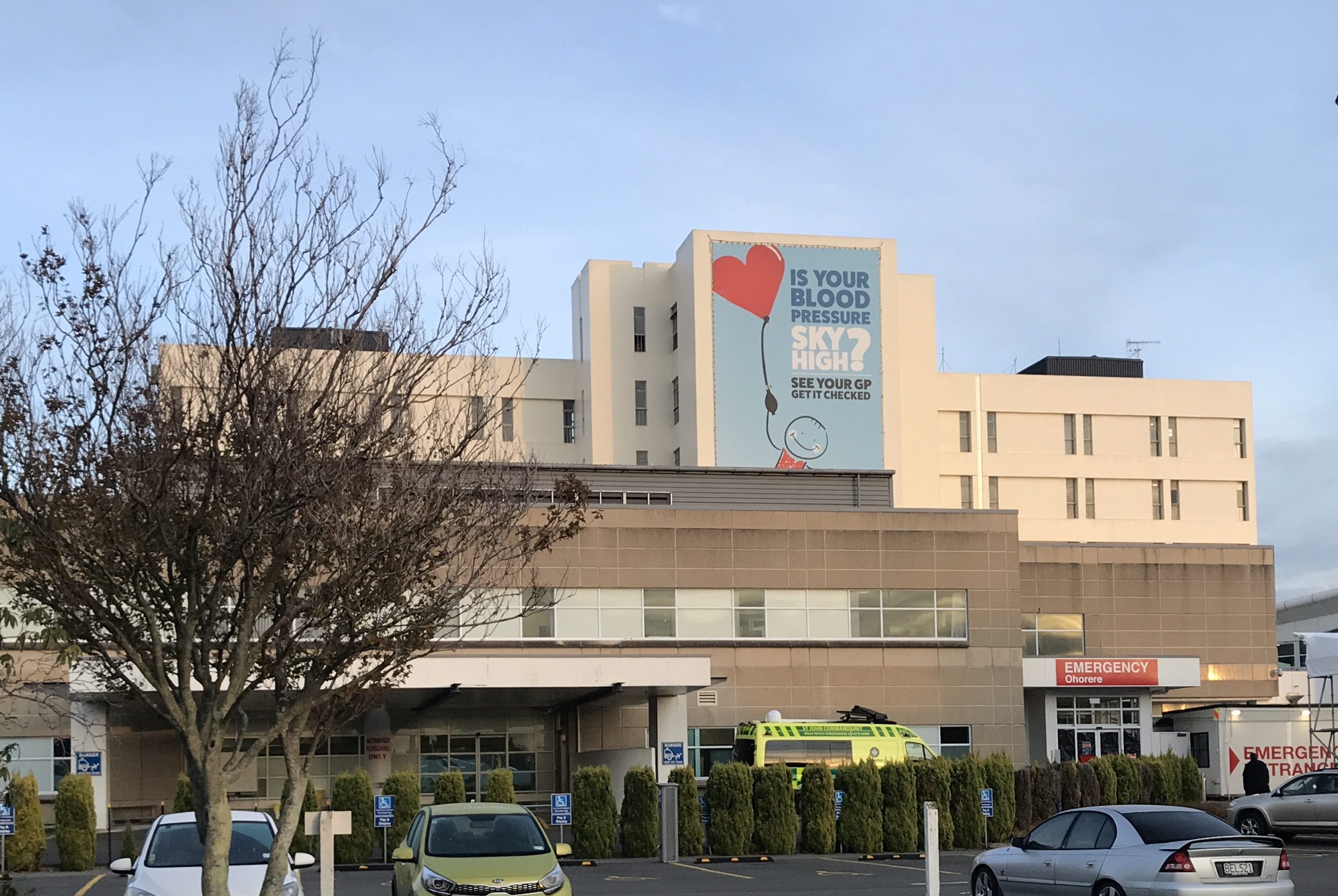
Palmerston North Hospital (2020)

=== Health ===
Palmerston North Hospital is the city's main public hospital, and is the seat of the MidCentral District Health Board. The hospital is the major trauma centre for Palmerston North, Otaki, and the Manawatu, Horowhenua and Tararua districts.

There were two private hospitals, Aorangi and Southern Cross. In 2012, these two private surgical hospitals merged and are now known as Crest Hospital.

=== Electricity ===
The Palmerston North Municipal Electricity Department (MED) was formed in 1924 to supply the city with electricity. The Manawatu-Oroua Electric Power Board (EPB) supplied the surrounding rural areas. Electricity was initially generated at the Keith Street power station until the transmission lines from Mangahao Power Station to Bunnythorpe substation were completed in March 1925. The Keith Street power station continued to regularly generate electricity until the Inter-Island HVDC link was commissioned in 1965, when it was relegated to standby duty before finally being decommissioned in 1992.

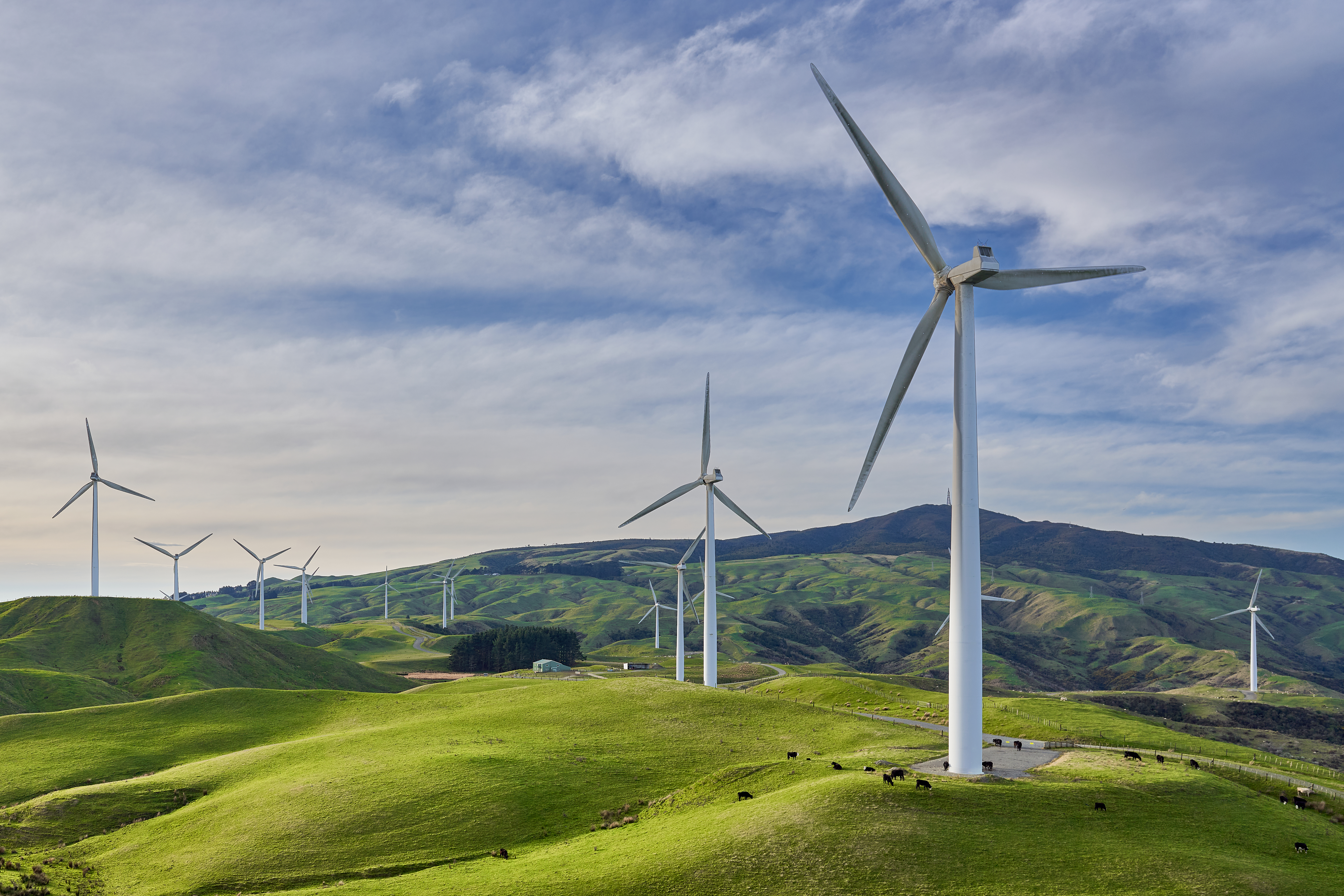
Te Apiti Wind Farm Lookout

The Palmerston North MED and Mawawatu Oroua EPB were dissolved in the late 1990s with the government electricity sector reforms. The retail business was sold to Genesis Energy while the lines business became part of Powerco. Today, Powerco continues to operate the local distribution network, with electricity fed from two Transpower substations, at Bunnythorpe and at Linton. There is now a competitive electricity retail market, although Genesis continues to be the dominant retailer in the city.

Four wind farms are located on the Ruahine and Tararua Ranges bordering Palmerston North: Te Āpiti Wind Farm, Tararua Wind Farm, Te Rere Hau Wind Farm, and Turitea Wind Farm. The four farms together have a maximum output of 520 MW.

=== Natural gas ===
Palmerston North was one of the original nine towns and cities in New Zealand to be supplied with natural gas when the Kapuni gas field entered production in 1970 and a 260 km high-pressure pipeline from Kapuni south to Wellington (including a 27 km lateral pipeline from Himatangi to supply Palmerston North) was completed. The high-pressure transmission pipelines supplying the city are now owned and operated by First Gas, with Powerco owning and operating the medium and low-pressure distribution pipelines within the city.

In the 2023 census, 24.4% of Palmerston North homes used fixed gas heaters as a main source of heating, the highest in New Zealand.

=== Internet and telephone ===
Fibre to the premises is being deployed in Palmerston North as part of the Government's Ultra-Fast Broadband programme. As of June 2018, the fibre roll-out in the city is 94 percent complete, with a 42.2 percent uptake rate.

=== Water and sewage ===
The majority of Palmerston North's water supply is drawn from the Turitea Stream, in the Tararua Range south of the city. The supply is supplemented by four artesian wells, at Papaioea Park, Takaro Park, Keith Street and Roberts Line. The waterworks first opened in 1889 and was extended in 1906, but the first sewers, septic tanks and filter beds not until 1907. The first sewage works was at Maxwells Line. Sewage is now treated at the nearby Tōtara Road, before discharging to the river. An upgrade is being planned to reduce pollution.

== Transport ==
Palmerston North is a significant road and rail junction. As such, it is an important distribution hub for the Central and lower North Island, with many freight distribution centres based here.

=== Road ===
Palmerston North's arterial roads are arranged in a grid pattern. There are four main dual-carriageway roads radiating from The Square, splitting the city into four quadrants: Rangitikei Street to the north, Fitzherbert Avenue to the south, and Main Street to the east and west.

==== State highways ====
Palmerston North is served by four state highways:

- State Highway 3 runs northwest–southeast from SH 1 at Sanson through central Palmerston North (via Rangitikei Street, Grey Street, Princess Street and Main Street East), to SH 2 at Woodville. The section from Sanson forms the main route from the upper North Island, Taranaki and Whanganui into Palmerston North, while the section from Woodville forms the main route from the Hawke's Bay into Palmerston North.
- State Highway 57 runs southwest–northeast from SH 1 at Ohau, south of Levin, through the southern outskirts of Palmerston North to SH 3 east of Ashhurst. It forms the main route from Wellington to southern and eastern Palmerston North.
- State Highway 56 runs southwest–northeast from SH 57 at Makeura, northeast of Shannon, New Zealand, to the intersection of Pioneer Highway and Maxwells Line in the suburb of Awapuni. It forms the main route from Wellington to northern and western Palmerston North.
- State Highway 54 runs north–south from SH 1 at Vinegar Hill, north of Hunterville, through Feilding to SH 3 at Newbury, on the northern Palmerston North border. It provides an alternative route from the Upper North island into Palmerston North

==== Cycling ====
Palmerston North is perceived as being better for cycling than most New Zealand cities, with 2001 figures putting it a close second only to Blenheim in terms of bicycle modal share. However, by 2006, cycling to work had almost halved in a decade to 5.4% and the 2013 census found that, in the central city, only 6 cycled, but 690 travelled by motor vehicle.

The Manawatu River Pathway is great for family or beginners riders, as it is all flat to mildly contoured, with some limestone sections, as well as wide cement paths. The track has many access points to this trail, which runs for over 9 km between Maxwells Line in the West to Riverside Drive in the East. A new 3 km section has been added between Ashhurst and Raukawa Road, with plans to link this to the existing path over the next two years, making over 22 km of scenic tracks to explore alongside the river.

Palmerston North has a fairly comprehensive 65 km on-road bicycle lane network, particularly in high traffic areas, to make it safer for people to get around the city by bike. All local buses have racks for two cycles.

The cycle lane network has been criticised for a number of reasons. Motor traffic is often too fast, and there is no physical barrier between bicyclists and motorists. Most bicycle lanes in the city are marked out with parking spaces for motorist parking, making those lanes 'pointless' and raising the risk of motorists opening car doors into the path of passing bicyclists.

Rebecca Oaten, the so-called 'Helmet Lady' who campaigned nationwide in the late 1980s for a New Zealand bicycle helmet law, is from Palmerston North.

=== Bus ===
After much discussion about introducing a tramway system to Palmerston North, including an ambitious tram subway under the central railway station, a £60,000 loan was taken out in 1912 for a tramway scheme. Support, however, was wavering and there were disagreements within the council over the mode of the trams, one of the proposals was from battery trams similar to the ones that ran in Gisborne. Eventually, the decision to install tramways in Palmerston North was rescinded by a referendum and in 1920 the die was cast for a motorbus system to begin in Palmerston North. The first buses arrived in Palmerston North by late 1921.

Urban services are coordinated by Horizons Regional Council, through Masterton-based bus company, Tranzit. Go cards were replaced by Bee Cards on 20 July 2020. The city's urban bus services are unique in New Zealand in that rides are offered free to tertiary students. Palmerston North is the first city to operate all electric bus fleet in the country since February 2024.

Palmerston North has eight cross-city bus routes (101–108) that connect the city's suburbs, passing through the Main Street Bus Hub (MSBH) adjacent to The Square. Routes 101–107 run every 15 minutes during peak times and every 30 minutes off-peak; route 108 operates as a weekday-only shopper service. An additional outer service, Route 114, connects Ashhurst with the city centre several times daily. Routes 121, 122, and 123 provide direct weekday-only services between suburban areas and Massey University, running towards Massey in the morning and returning in the afternoon. Tertiary students are eligible for free bus travel, funded through university parking fees.

Daily services run to the nearby towns of Linton, Feilding (311 bus via Palmerston North Airport), Foxton, Levin and Marton.

Inter-regional routes are operated by Intercity and Tranzit. Intercity's routes run south (to Wellington), north (towards Auckland, via Whanganui, Rotorua and Taupō, or Napier) and east (to Masterton) from the bus terminal in The Square, Palmerston North.

=== Air ===
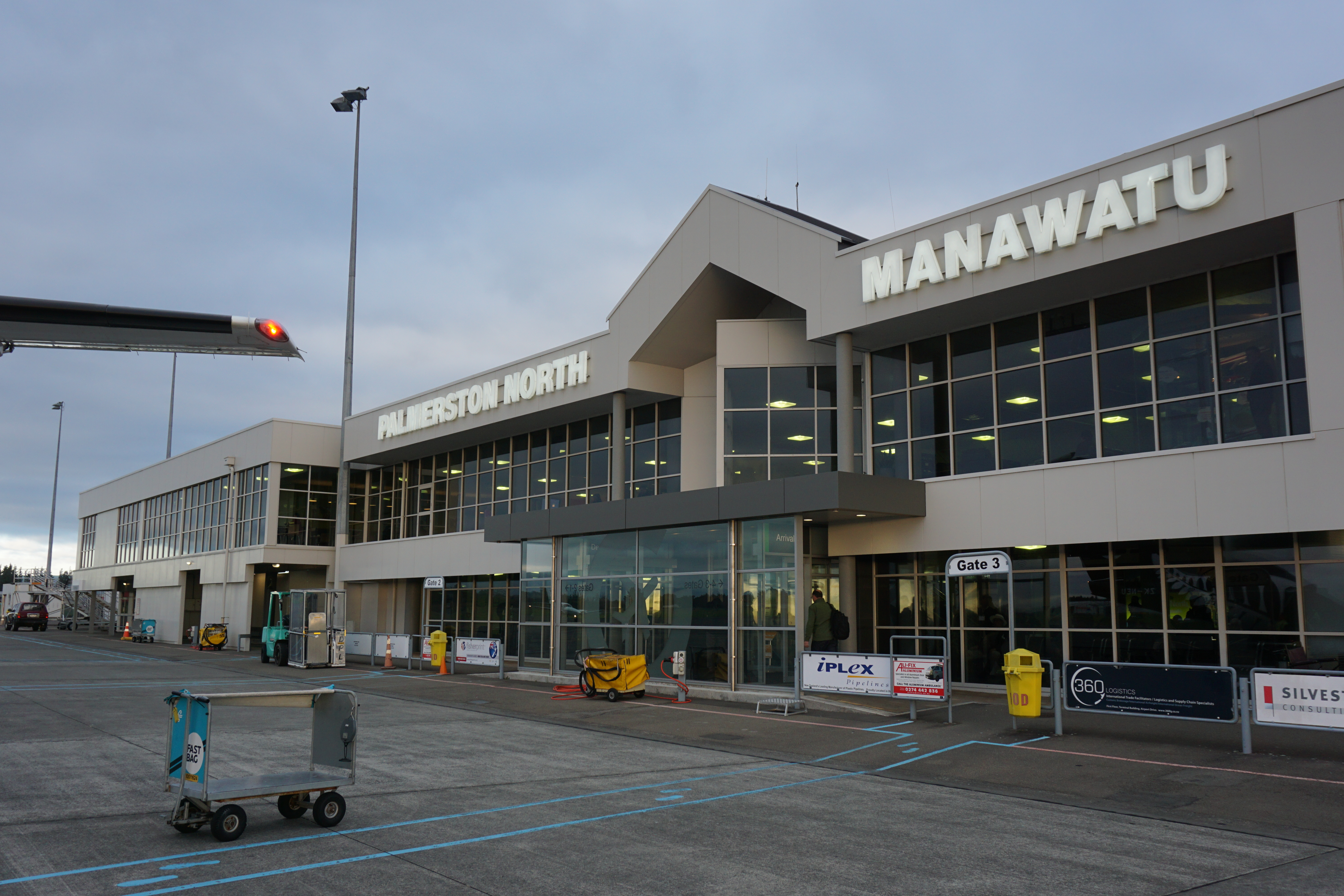
Palmerston North Airport Terminal Building

Palmerston North Airport is located in the suburb of Milson, approximately 5.5 kilometres (3.4 mi) north of the central business district. It is a regional gateway to the central North Island region. The airport has regular services to domestic destinations including Auckland, Christchurch, Hamilton and Nelson operated by Air New Zealand and Originair. International services operated out of Palmerston North between 1996 and 2008, with Freedom Air connecting Palmerston North with Brisbane, Sydney, Melbourne, the Gold Coast and Nadi.

The airport can be accessed by bus. 2 bus routes: 101 (Airport-Massey University) and 311 (Palmerston North-Feilding via Airport) connects the airport and city centre within 20 mins.

The airport is presently the operational base of the Massey University School of Aviation. The airport is also a freight hub for Parcelair.

The runway at Palmerston North Airport, 07/25, is orientated true east–west, which requires aircraft on a long approach to runway 25 to cross the Tararua Range. On 9 June 1995, four people were killed when Ansett New Zealand Flight 703 crashed into the range while on approach to runway 25, after the Dash 8's right landing gear jammed and the pilots failed to monitor the flight path while carrying out the alternate gear extension procedure.

=== Rail ===
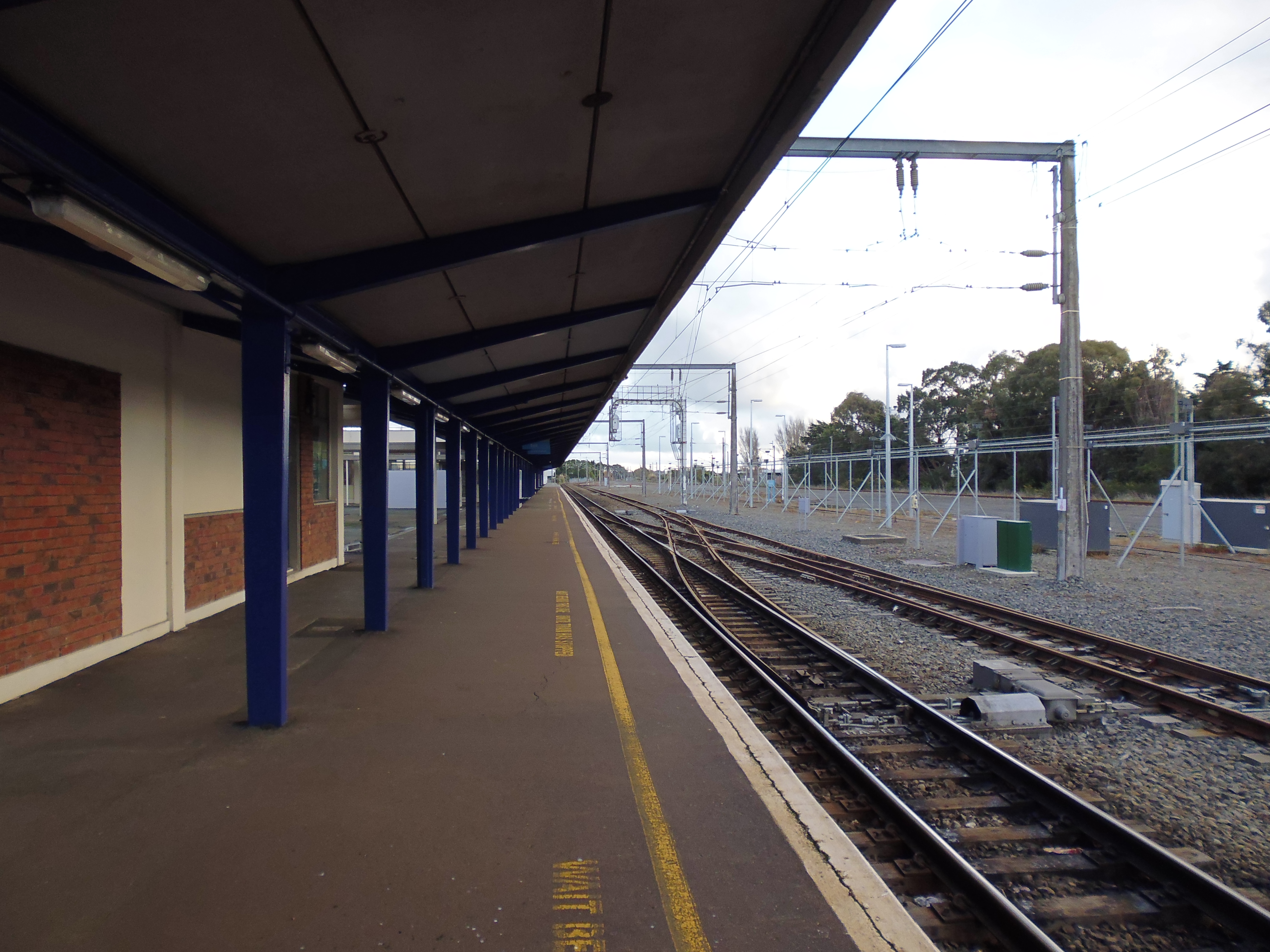
Platform at Palmerston North Railway Station

Palmerston North is on the North Island Main Trunk Railway. There are two passenger trains run by KiwiRail: the weekday-only Capital Connection commuter train once a day to and from Wellington, and the Northern Explorer to and from Auckland and Wellington.

Until 1964, the railway ran through the city centre, with Palmerston North railway station in The Square. The station was moved, and the track diverted 2.5 km (2 mi) to the north by the Milson Deviation in 1959–1963; work on the deviation had started in 1926.

Near the current railway station, the North Island Main Trunk railway is joined by the Palmerston North - Gisborne Line, which runs through the Manawatū Gorge to Woodville and Hawke's Bay. A connection to the Wairarapa Line is at Woodville.

== Education ==
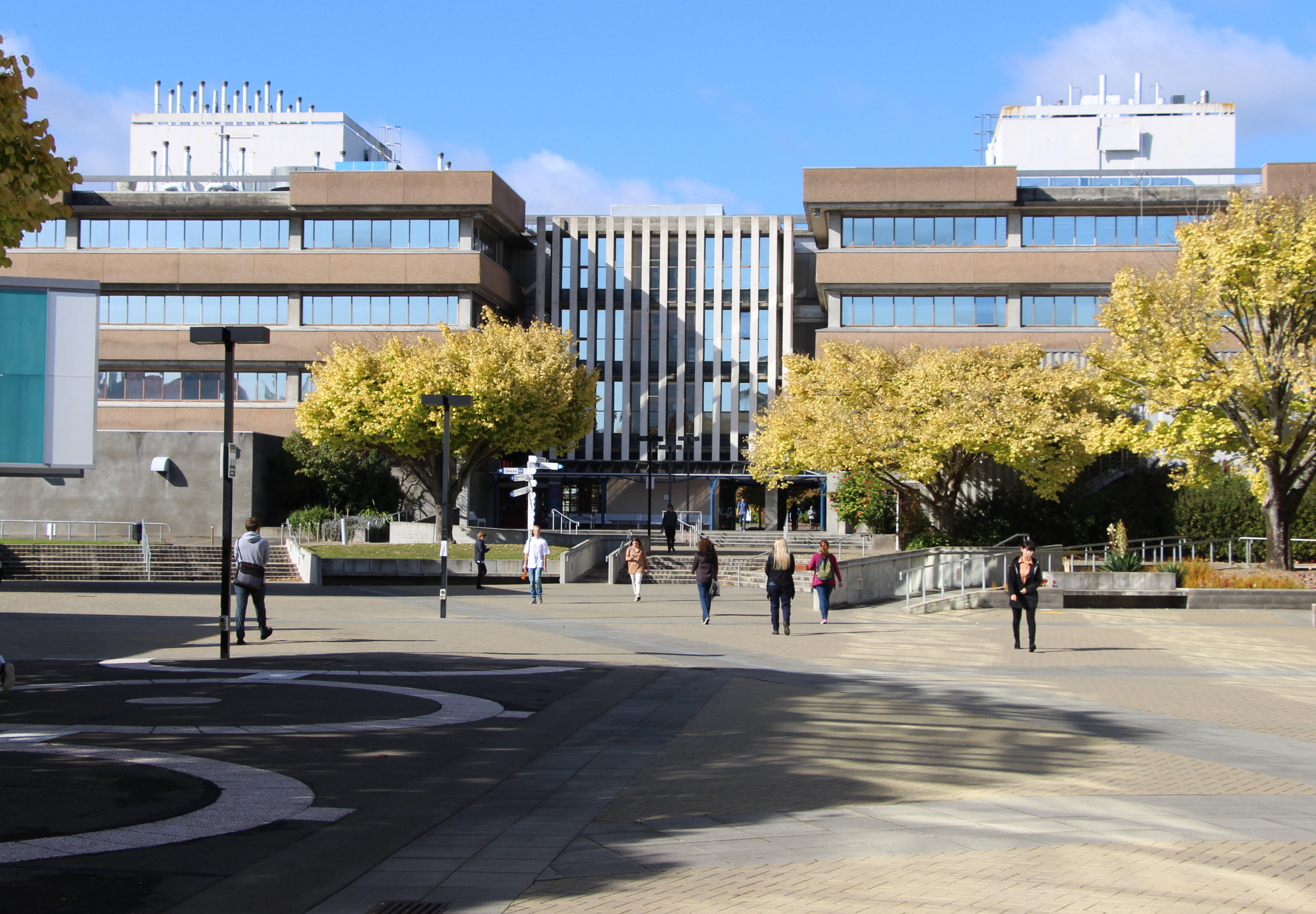
Massey University, Palmerston North Campus (2016)

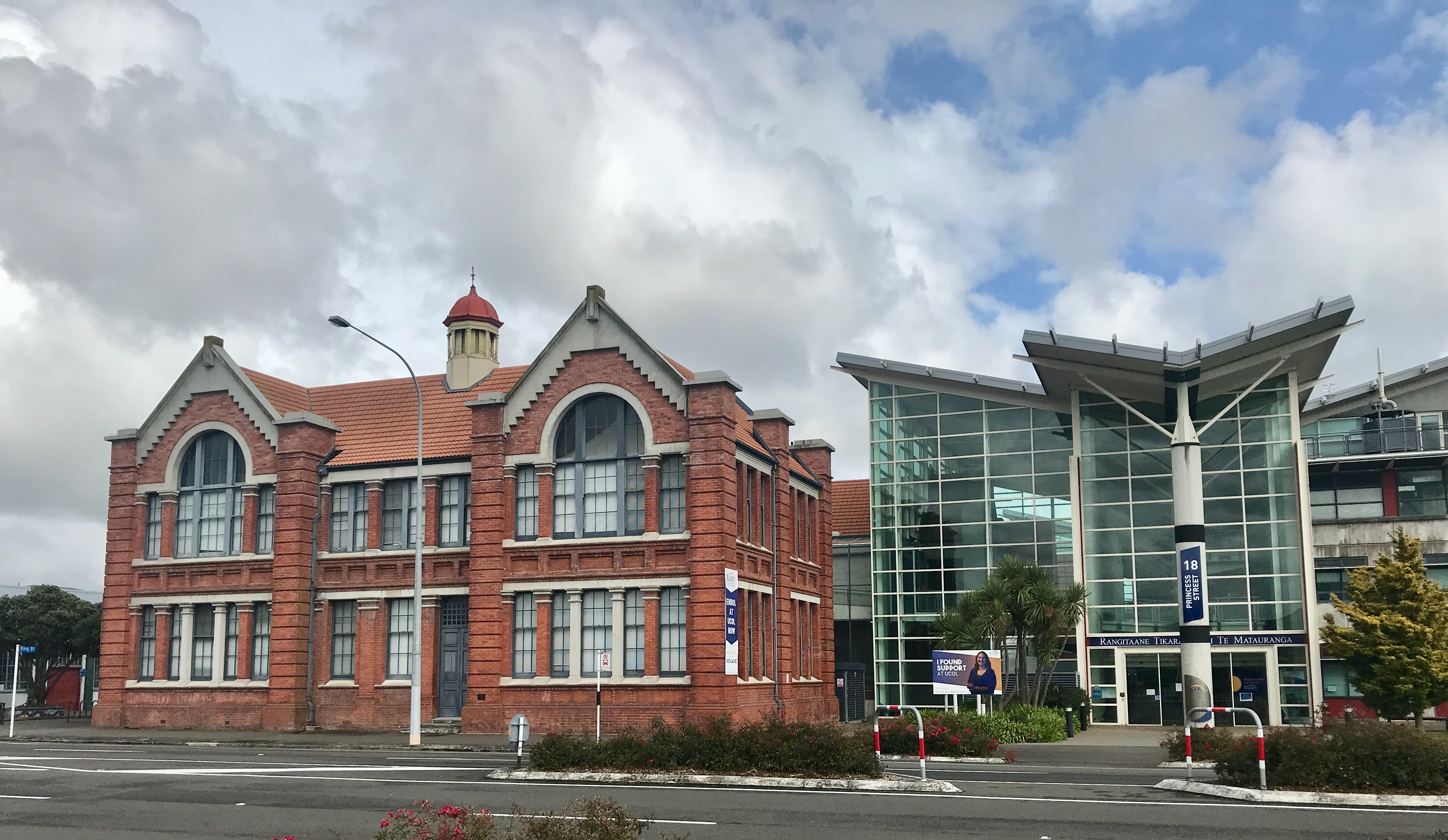
UCOL Palmerston North Campus

Palmerston North is considered "the student city" of New Zealand's North Island. It is an important base for tertiary institutions. The home campuses of Massey University, Universal College of Learning (UCOL) and Institute of the Pacific United (IPU) are here. A large proportion of Palmerston North's population consists of students attending these institutions or the various Papaioea Campuses of Te Wananga o Aotearoa during the student year.

Tertiary Education Institutions

School name	Location
Massey University	Turitea
Universal College of Learning	Palmerston North Central
Institute of the Pacific United	Aokautere
Te Wānanga o Aotearoa	Various locations around Palmerston North
The Design School	The Square Palmerston North

Primary and Secondary Schools

Palmerston North has five state secondary schools: Palmerston North Boys' High School and Queen Elizabeth College in the north, Freyberg High School in the north-east, Palmerston North Girls High School in the south, and Awatapu College in the south-west. The city also has one state-integrated Catholic secondary school, St Peter's College.

Palmerston North also has one special character secondary school: Cornerstone Christian School, Palmerston North

== Media ==
The major daily newspaper in Palmerston North is the Manawatu Standard, while the weekly community newspaper is the Guardian.

Palmerston North is part of the wider Manawatū radio market, the sixth-largest in New Zealand with 157,000 listeners aged 10 and over. The largest commercial stations by share as of May 2025 are Newstalk ZB (12.7%), Magic (9.8%), The Breeze (8.7%), The Sound (8.5%), and Mai FM (8.1%). Local radio stations or national stations with local breakouts include More FM (formerly "2XS") featuring the popular "Mike West in the Morning" breakfast show from 6am-10am. Sister station The Breeze also has a local breakfast show from 6am-10am hosted by Burnzee. Radio Control is the local alternative student radio station, featuring local personality Abi Symes on "The Continental Breakfast" from 7 am to 9 am. Access Manawatu 999AM is a local community station and Kia Ora FM is the local Iwi station.

The city's main television and FM radio transmitter is located atop Wharite Peak, 20 km (12 mi) northeast of the city centre. The first transmitter at the site was commissioned in 1963 to relay Wellington's WNTV1 channel (now part of TVNZ 1). The current main transmitter was built in 1966.

== Sister cities ==
Palmerston North has four sister cities:

- Missoula, Montana, United States
- Guiyang, People's Republic of China
- Kunshan, People's Republic of China
- Mihara, Hiroshima, Japan

== Notable people ==
- Constance Abraham (1864–1942), community leader and sportswoman
- John Clarke (1948–2017), satirist, author and actor
- Matthew Conger (born 1978), FIFA international football referee
- Shane Cortese (born 1968), actor and singer
- Margot Forde (1935–1992), botanist, curator, and taxonomist
- Rodger Fox (1953–2024), trombonist, jazz educator and leader of the Rodger Fox Big Band
- Brendon Hartley (born 1989), racing driver and FIA World Endurance Championship champion
- Spankie Jackzon (born 1984), winner of season 2 of RuPaul's Drag Race Down Under and season 2 of House of Drag
- Elijah Just (born 2000) New Zealand international footballer
- Alan Loveday (1928–2016), violinist
- Joseph Nathan (1835–1912), founder of Glaxo (since merged to become the multinational GlaxoSmithKline)
- Evelyn Rawlins (1889–1977), music teacher
- Grant Robertson (born 1971), former Labour MP for Wellington Central and list MP. 42nd Minister of Finance and 19th Deputy Prime Minister of New Zealand
- David Seymour (born 1983), 21st Deputy Prime Minister of New Zealand. 1st Minister for Regulation. ACT MP for Epsom and leader of the ACT party
- Ross Taylor (born 1984), Central Districts and New Zealand Black Caps cricket player and captain
- Simon van Velthooven (born 1988), track racing cyclist and America's Cup sailor

== Planes named after the city ==
- An NAC Vickers Viscount (ZK-NAI) was named "City of Palmerston North". This aircraft was withdrawn from NAC service in 1975.
- Two Ansett New Zealand de Havilland Canada Dash 8s was also named "City of Palmerston North". The first was ZK-NEY, which crashed while approaching Palmerston North on 9 June 1995 as Ansett New Zealand Flight 703. The second was ZK-NES, which stayed in service until the airline's demise.

== See also ==
- List of Art Deco architecture
