= Hopwood Clock Tower =

Clock tower in Palmerston North, New Zealand

- Kerei Te Panau
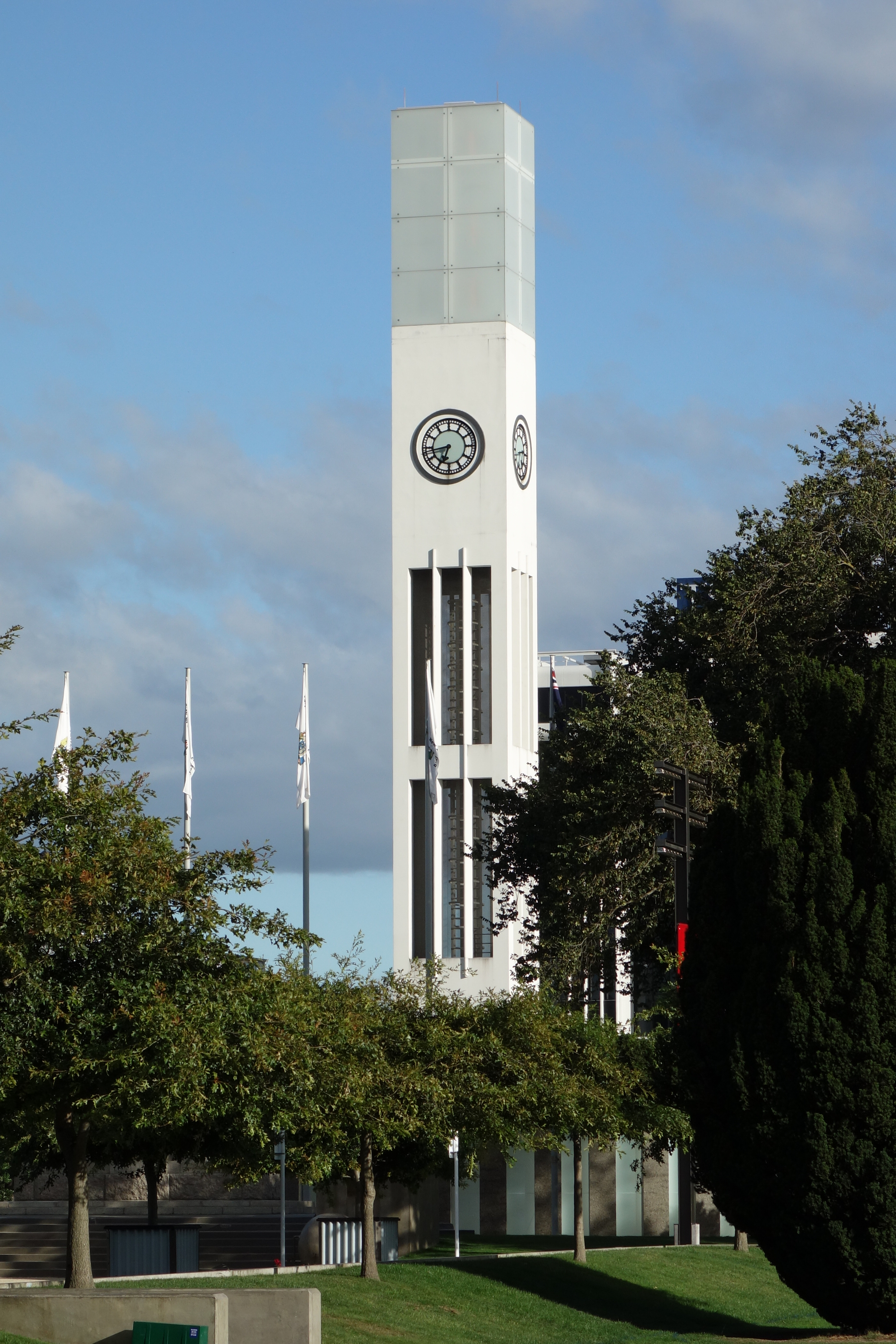
- The tower in 2014
- Alternative names: Hopwood's Tower

General information
- Type: Clock tower
- Location: Palmerston North, New Zealand
- Coordinates: 40°21′23″S 175°36′40.82″E
- Construction started: c. 1953
- Completed: 1957
- Cost: About £10,000
- Renovation cost: $1.7 million

Technical details
- Floor count: 6

The Hopwood Clock Tower, also known as the Palmerston North Clock Tower or Kerei Te Panau, is a clock tower in the centre of The Square in Palmerston North, New Zealand. The tower is named after local businessman Arthur Hopwood, who paid for it to be constructed in 1953. The Māori name for the clock tower, 'Kerei Te Panau', comes from the name of a local Rangitāne chieftain.

The modern tower has two luminous features, a 'lantern cross' at its top and light-up glass panes at the base.

== History ==
The four-faced clock was originally in the city's post office tower on Main Street, which was removed for safety reasons following the 1942 Wairarapa earthquake, and the clock put into storage. In 1953 local businessman Arthur Hopwood, whose family owned a hardware store, paid £10,000 for the council to build a new tower for the clock and chimes. A band rotunda was demolished to make way for it. The tower was completed some time in 1957.

The tower has been renovated several times. In 1960, a cross was put on the top temporarily for Christmas, but stayed permanently. It was replaced with a larger cross in 1981. The sound shell at the tower's base was removed in about 1990. The cross, a symbol that had become controversial as to whether it was still appropriate, blew down in 2006. During refurbishment of the Square in the mid-2000s the building was checked against modern building regulations and it was deemed that significant strengthening was needed. The tower was demolished and renewed with a stronger structure that matched the old design. The lantern section, which features a cross inside, was added during this process. This process was completed in March 2007 and cost $1.7 million. The lighting is changed on national holidays (such as Anzac Day), and other events. Registered charities can request that the lighting be changed for a day of significance, an example being Earth Day.
