= PRiME sculptures =

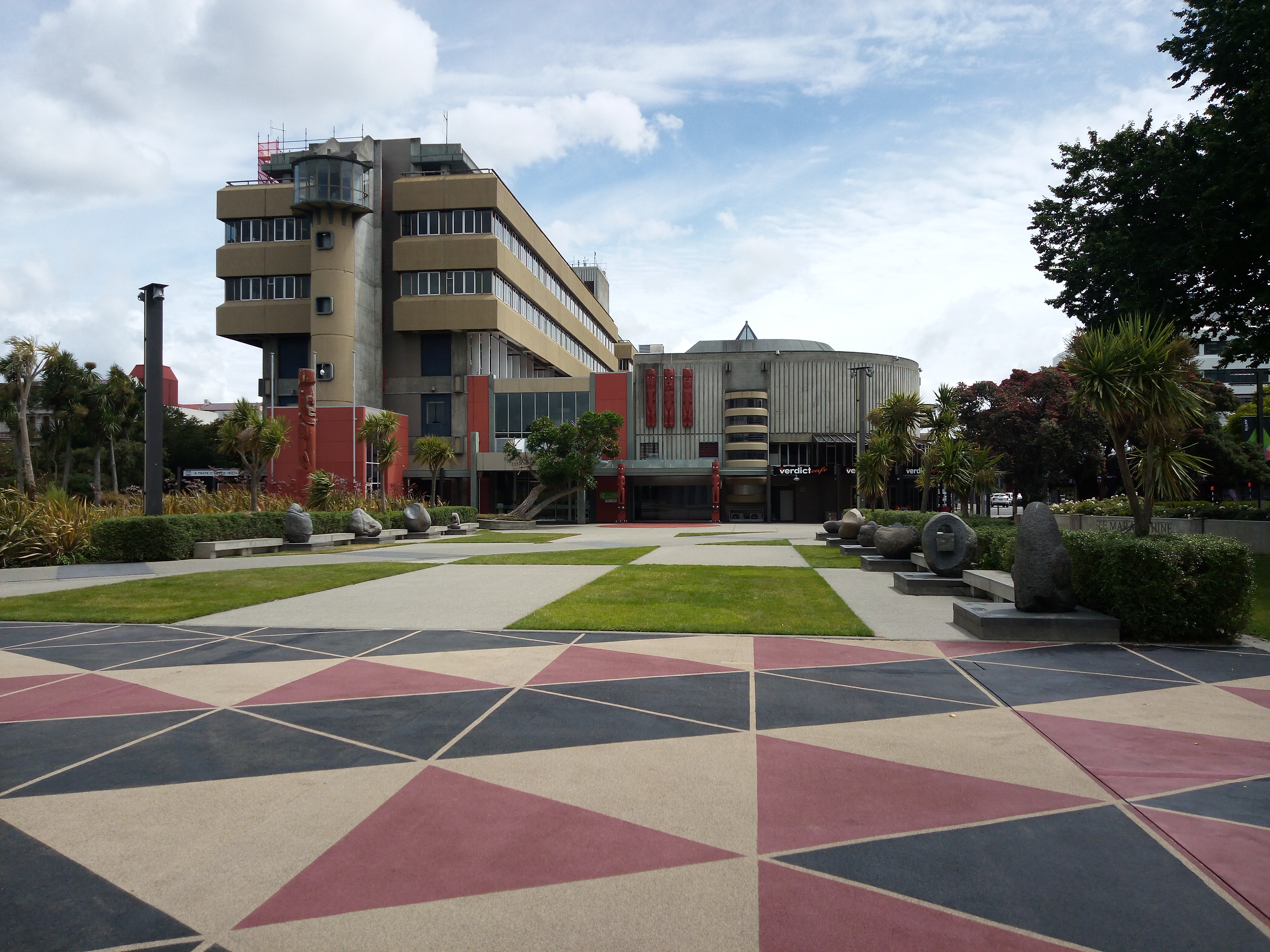
- Te Marae o Hine, showing the sculptures lining the marae
- Interactive map of PRiME sculptures
- Location: Te Marae o Hine, Palmerston North, New Zealand
- Coordinates: 40°21′25″S 175°36′40″E
- Material: Taranaki Andesite
- Opening date: 2006

The PRiME sculptures are a series of ten stone carvings by Pacific artists located in Te Marae o Hine in Palmerston North, New Zealand. The sculptures are made of Taranaki andesite and were carved during the Pacific Rim Millennium Experience from February to March 2000. They were installed permanently in Te Marae o Hine in 2006.

== Pacific Rim Millennium Experience ==
As part of the Millennium celebrations in 2000, Palmerston North held an arts festival which featured stone-carving in The Square. Twenty-five tons of Taranaki andesite were used and ten artists from around the Pacific Rim participated. The carving took place over a ten day period from 19 February to 3 March, with the sculptures unveiled on 4 March.

Following their public display the sculptures were taken to Rangimarie Marae at Rangiotu. One sculpture by Warren Warbrick was vandalised before it was moved.

The artists participating were Hisao Kameyama, Para Matchitt, Warren Warbrick, Debbie Hall, Sarah Dutt, Johnny Penisula, Stephen Gwaliasi, Naibuka Tuitaru, Filipe Tohi, and Richard Cooper.

The sculptures were returned to The Square in a 2005–2006 redevelopment project, which saw them positioned along the edges of Te Marae o Hine, the city's formal marae space.

== List of sculptures ==
The sculptures are positioned around the edges of Te Marae o Hine on the east side of The Square. On the north edge, running from west to east, the sculptures are;

- "Melting Stone" by Deborah Anne Hall
- "Alleluia" by Sarah Dutt and Metuanooroa Tapuni
- "Te Marae O Hine" by Para Matchitt
- "Untitled" by Hisao Kameyama
- "Untitled" by Filipe Tohi
- "Untitled" by Naibuka Tuitaru
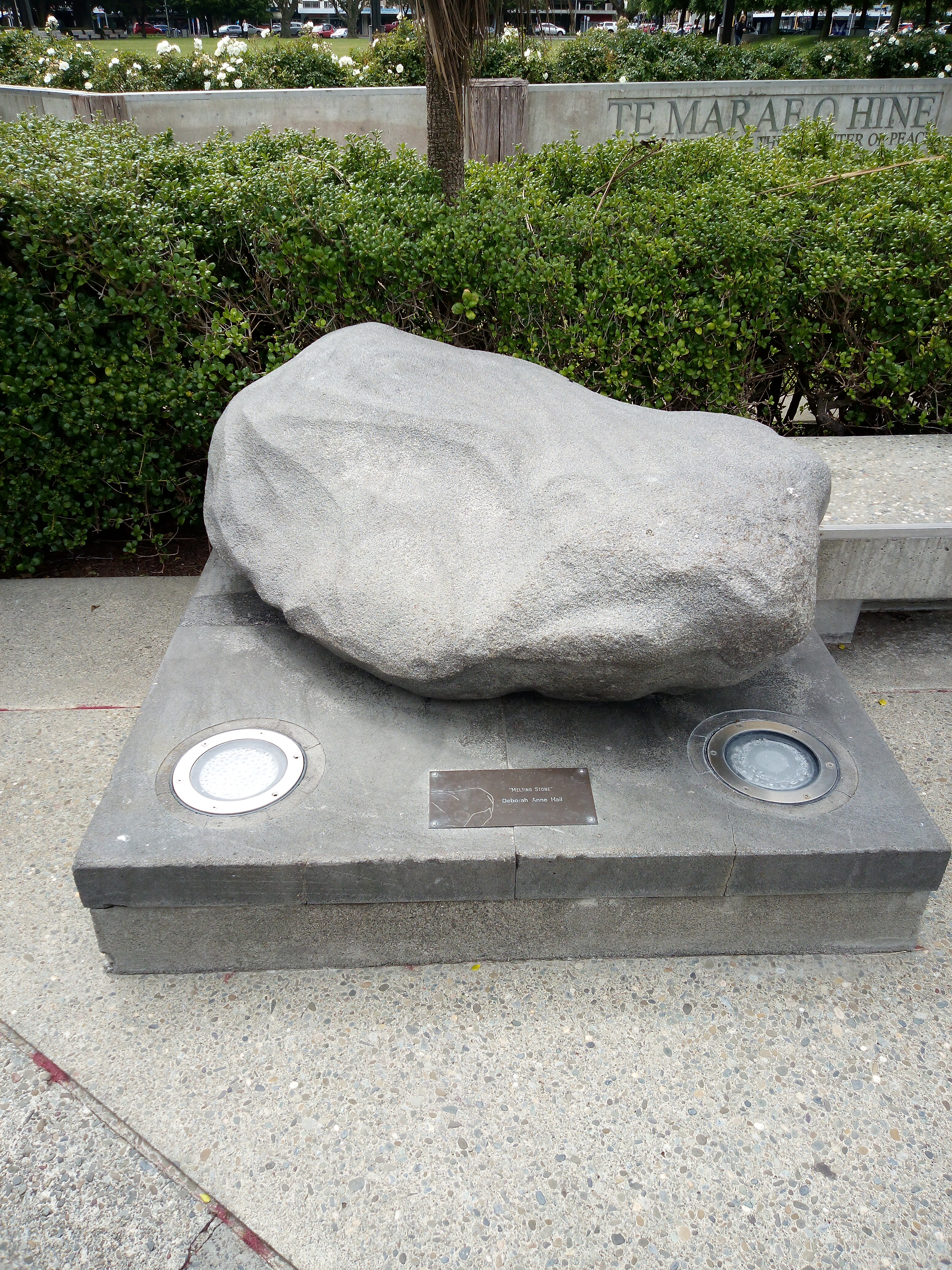
"Melting Stone" by Deborah Anne Hall

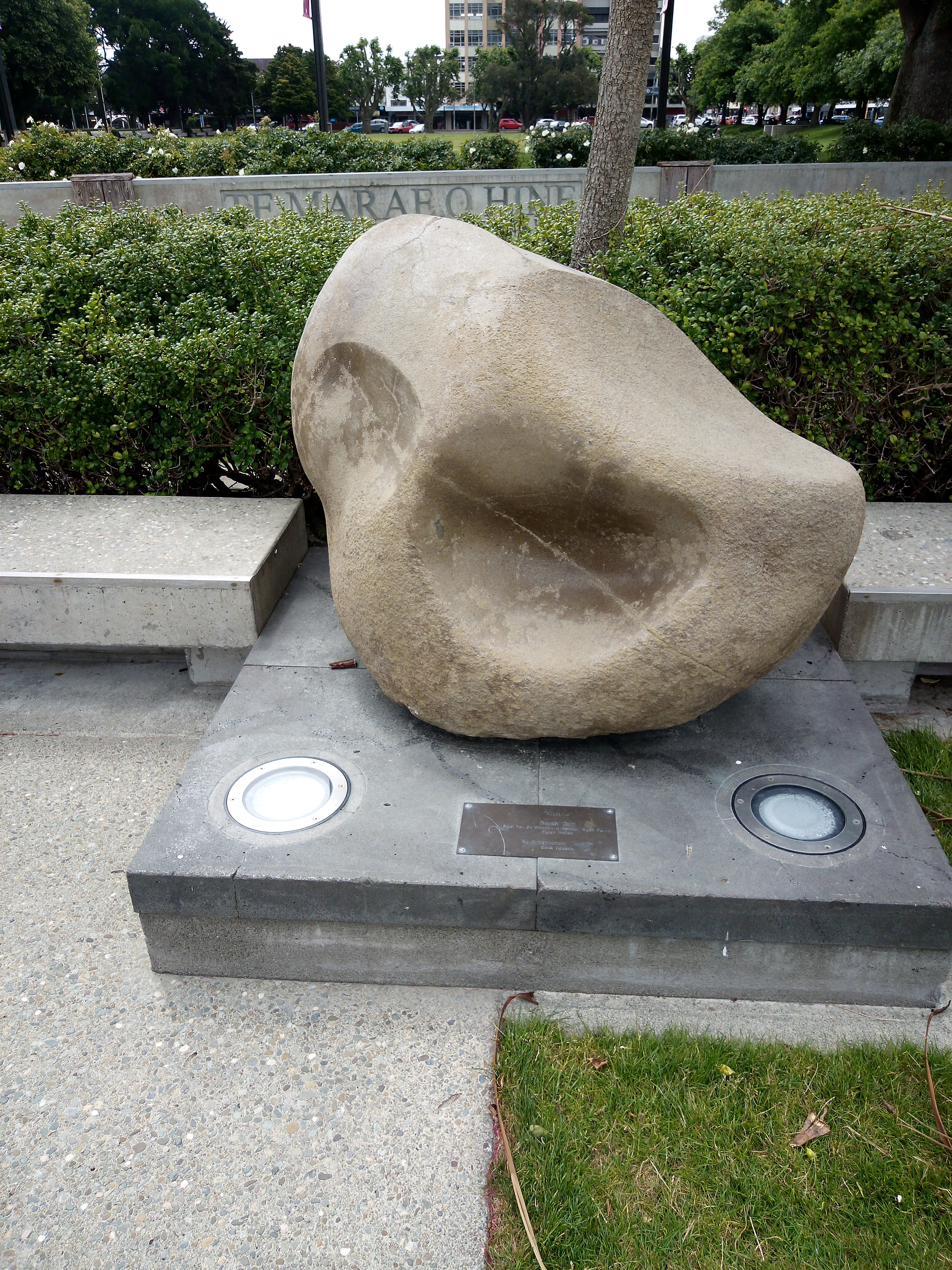
"Alleluia" by Sarah Dutt and Metuanooroa Tapuni

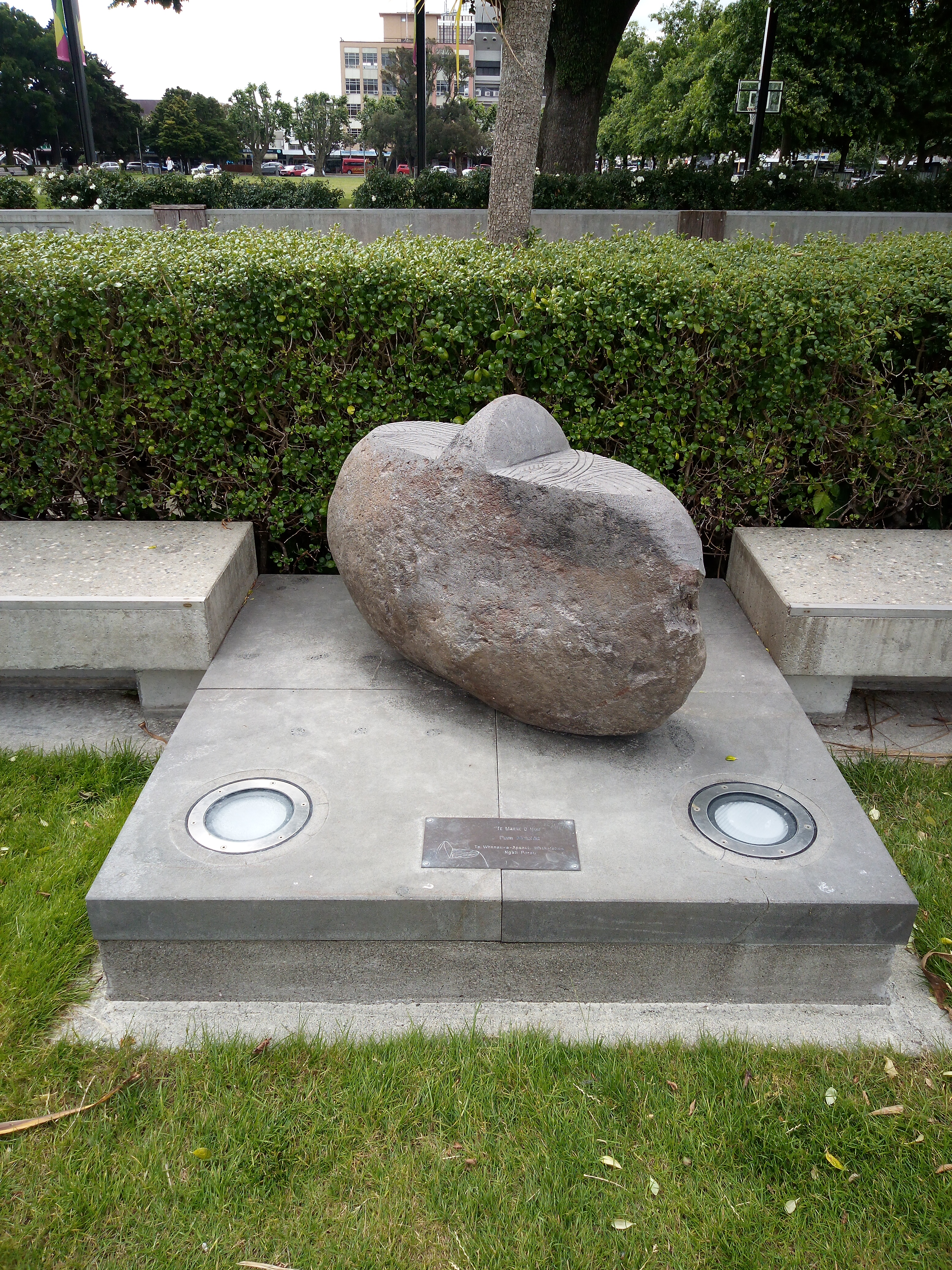
"Te Marae O Hine" by Para Matchitt

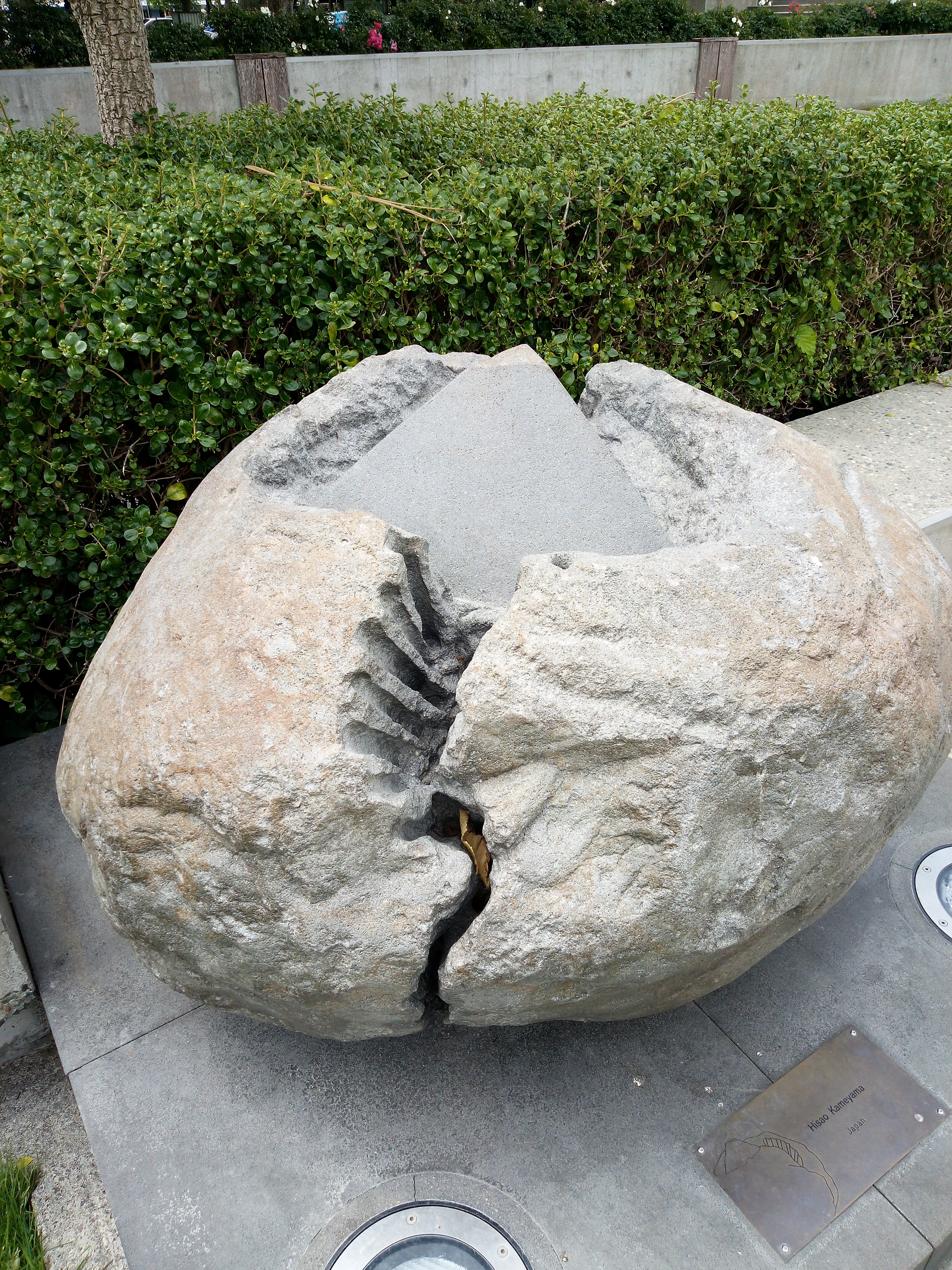
"Untitled" by Hisao Kameyama

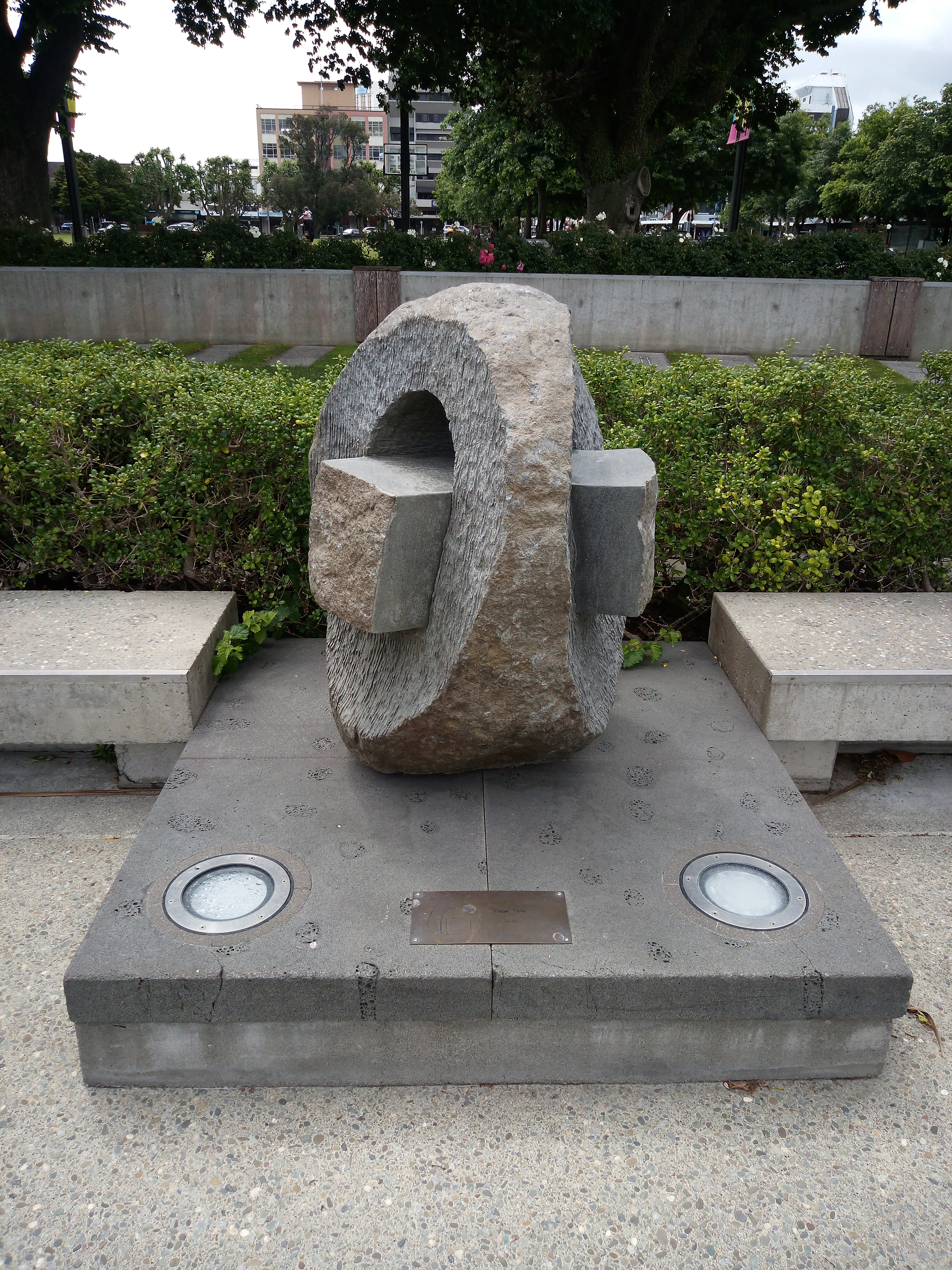
"Untitled" by Filipe Tohi

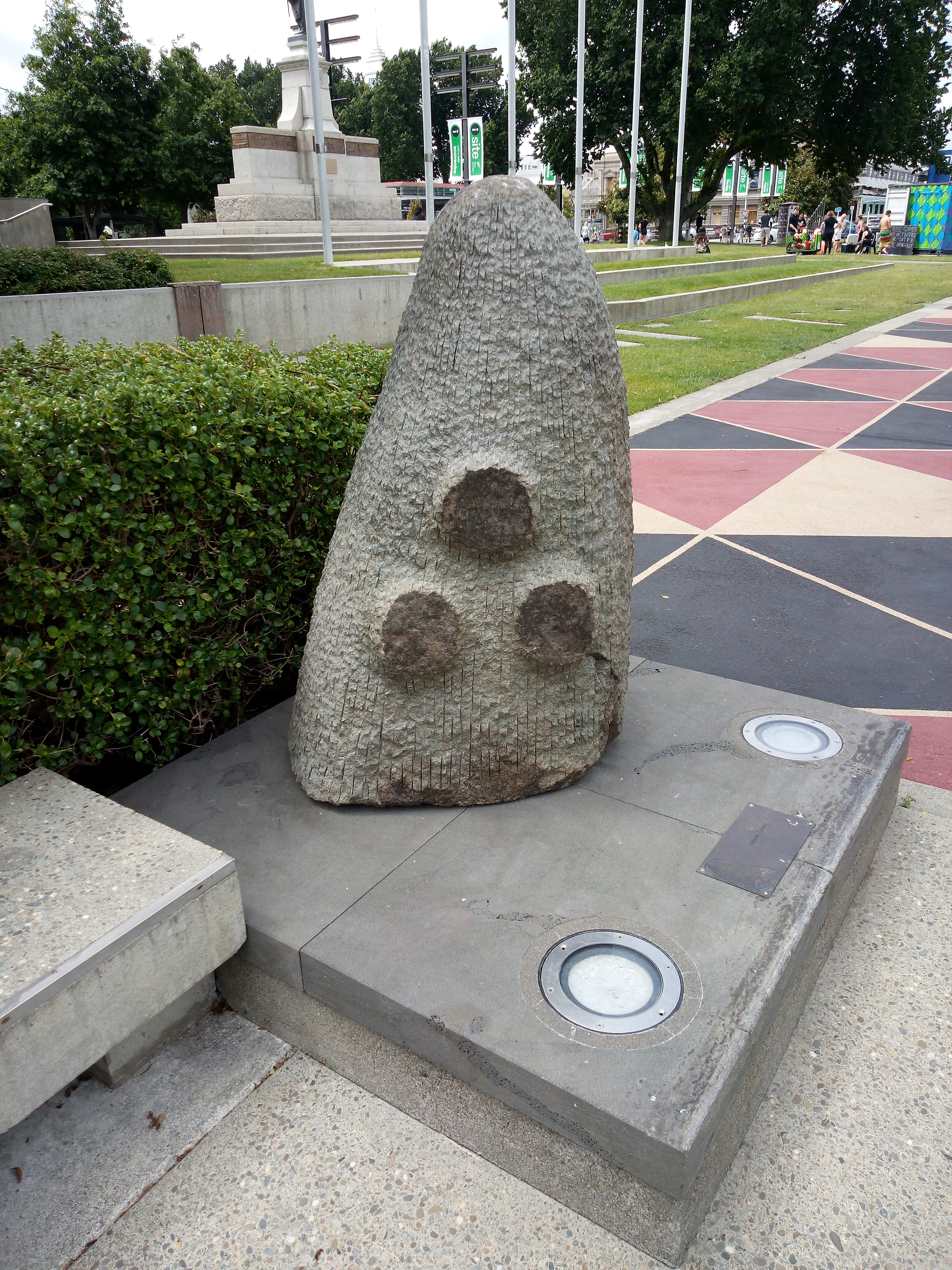
"Untitled" by Naibuka Tuitaru

On the south side, running from west to east, are:

- "Hoani Meihana Te Rangiotu" by Warren Warbrick
- "He Tangata E Tangata... It is People" by Dr Richard Shortland Cooper
- "Untitled", by Johnny Penisula
- "Untitled" by Steven Gwaliasi
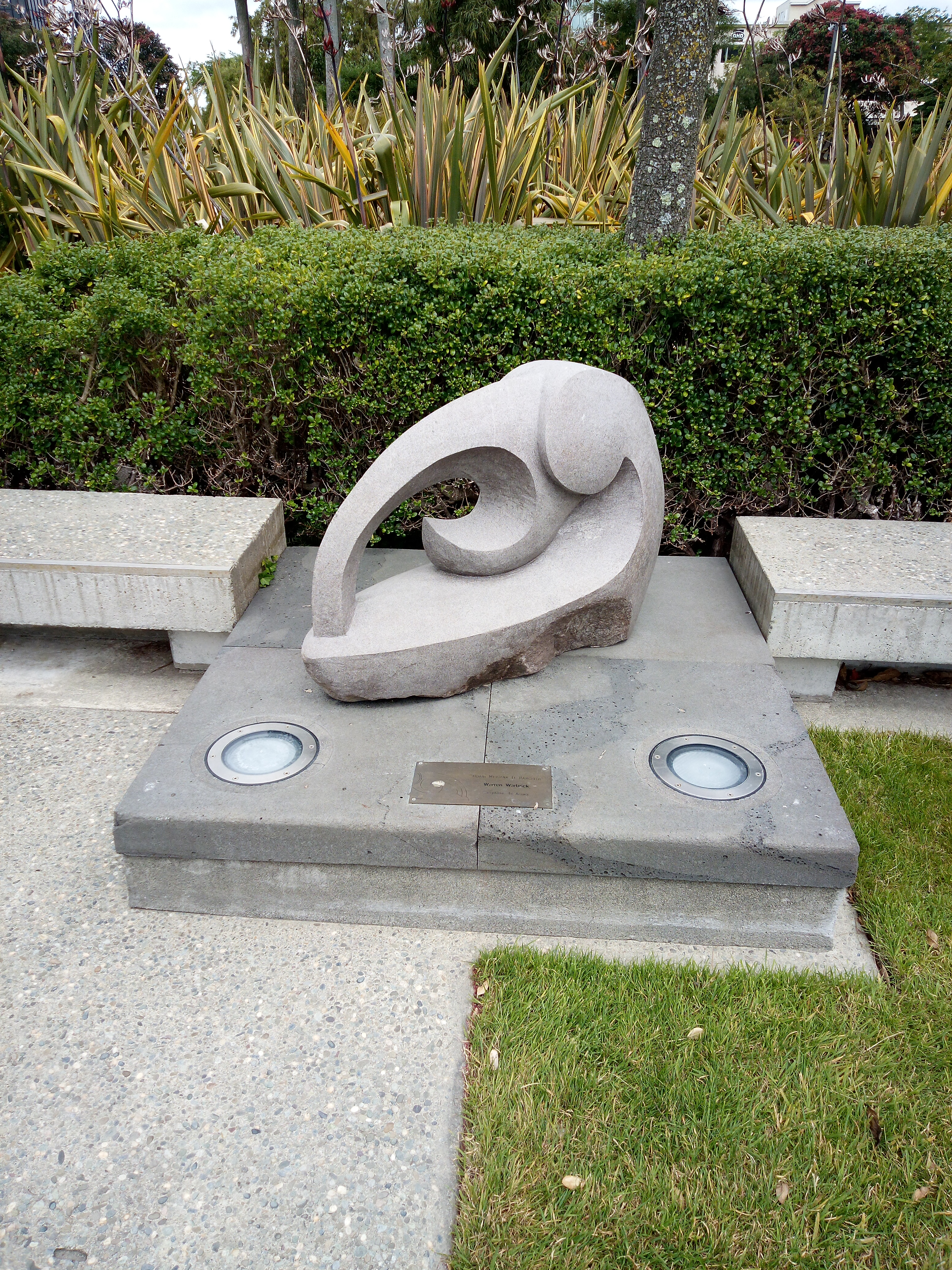
"Hoani Meihana Te Rangiotu" by Warren Warbrick

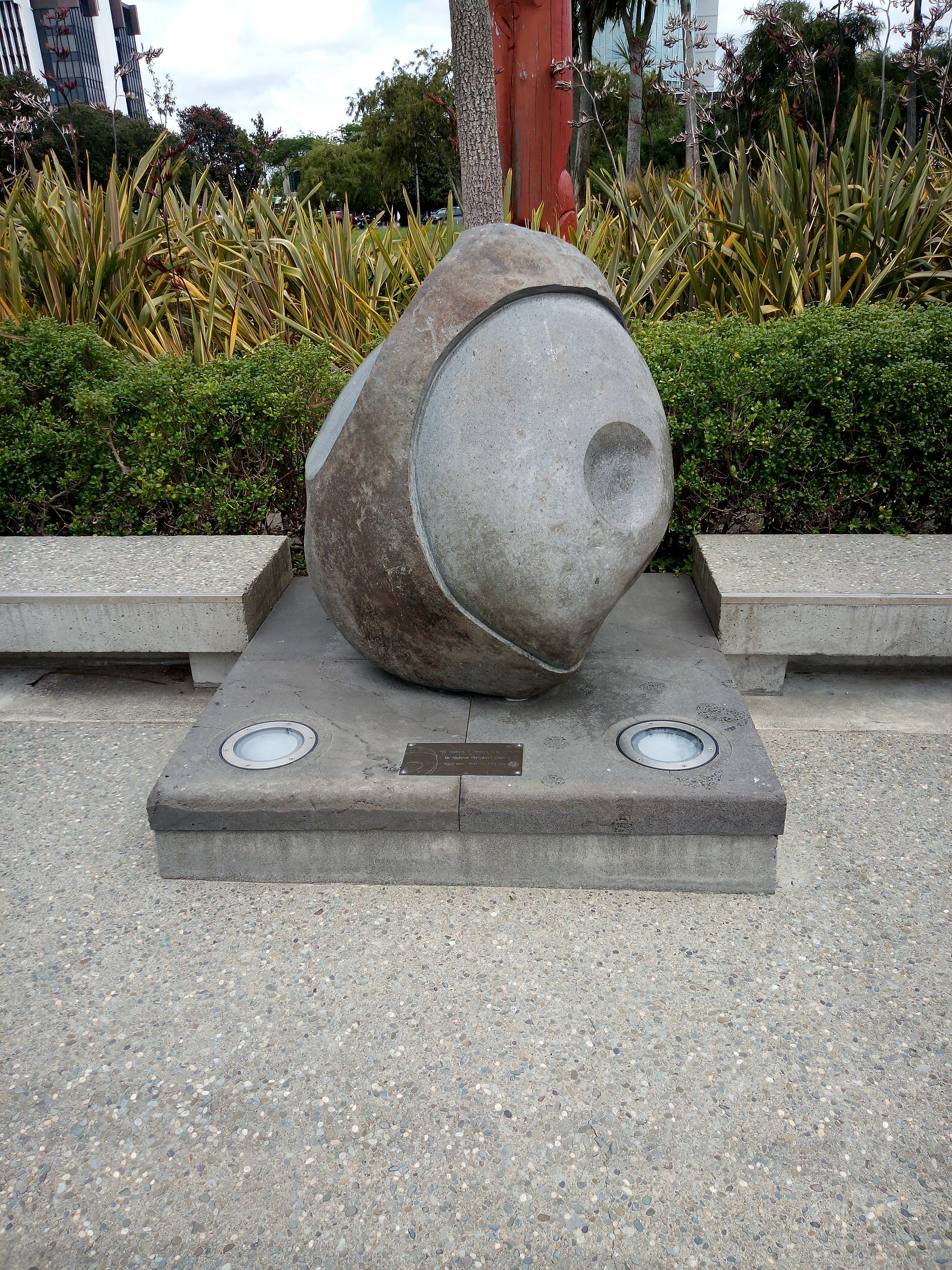
"He Tangata E Tangata... It is People" by Dr Richard Shortland Cooper

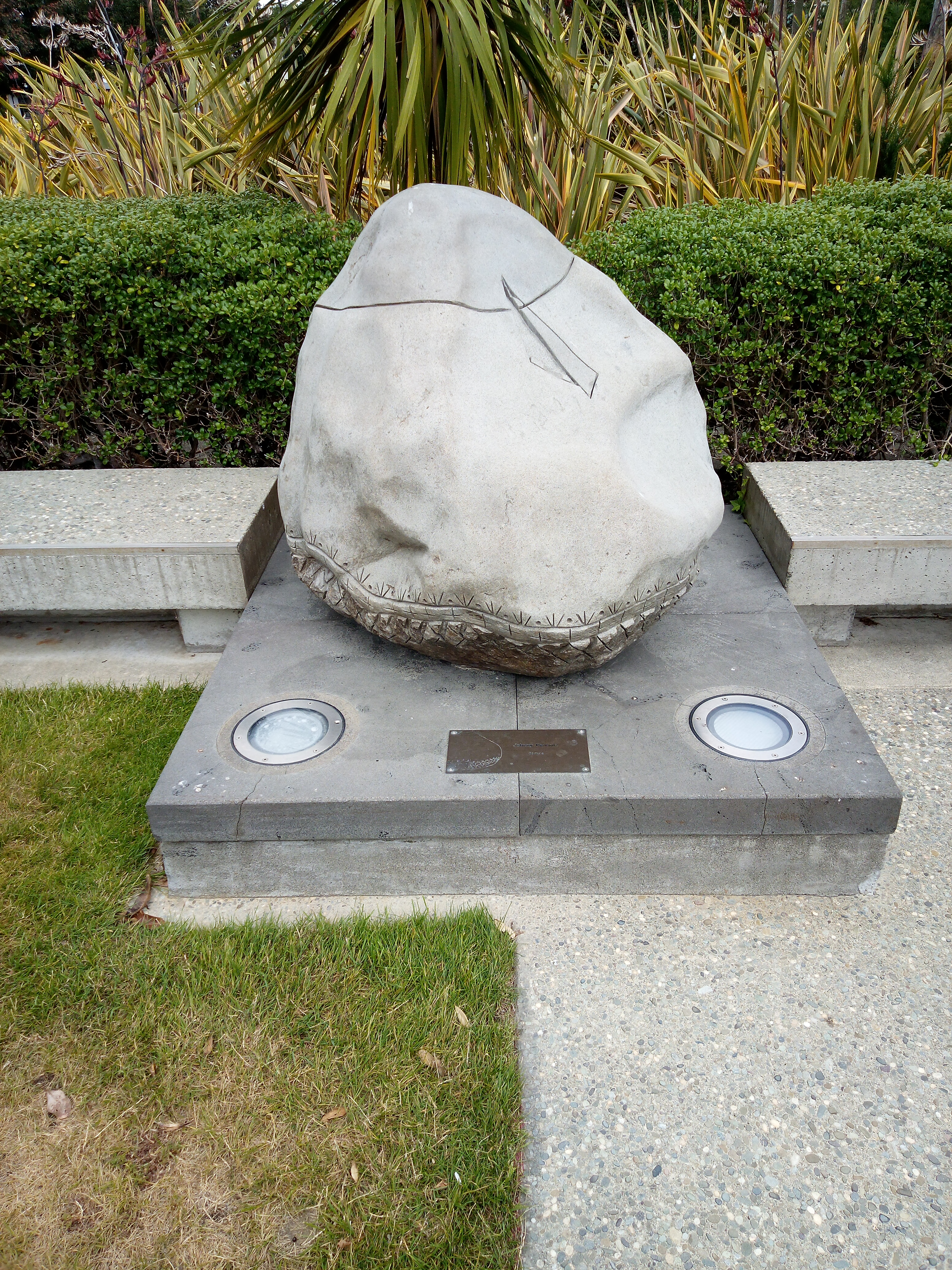
"Untitled", by Johnny Penisula

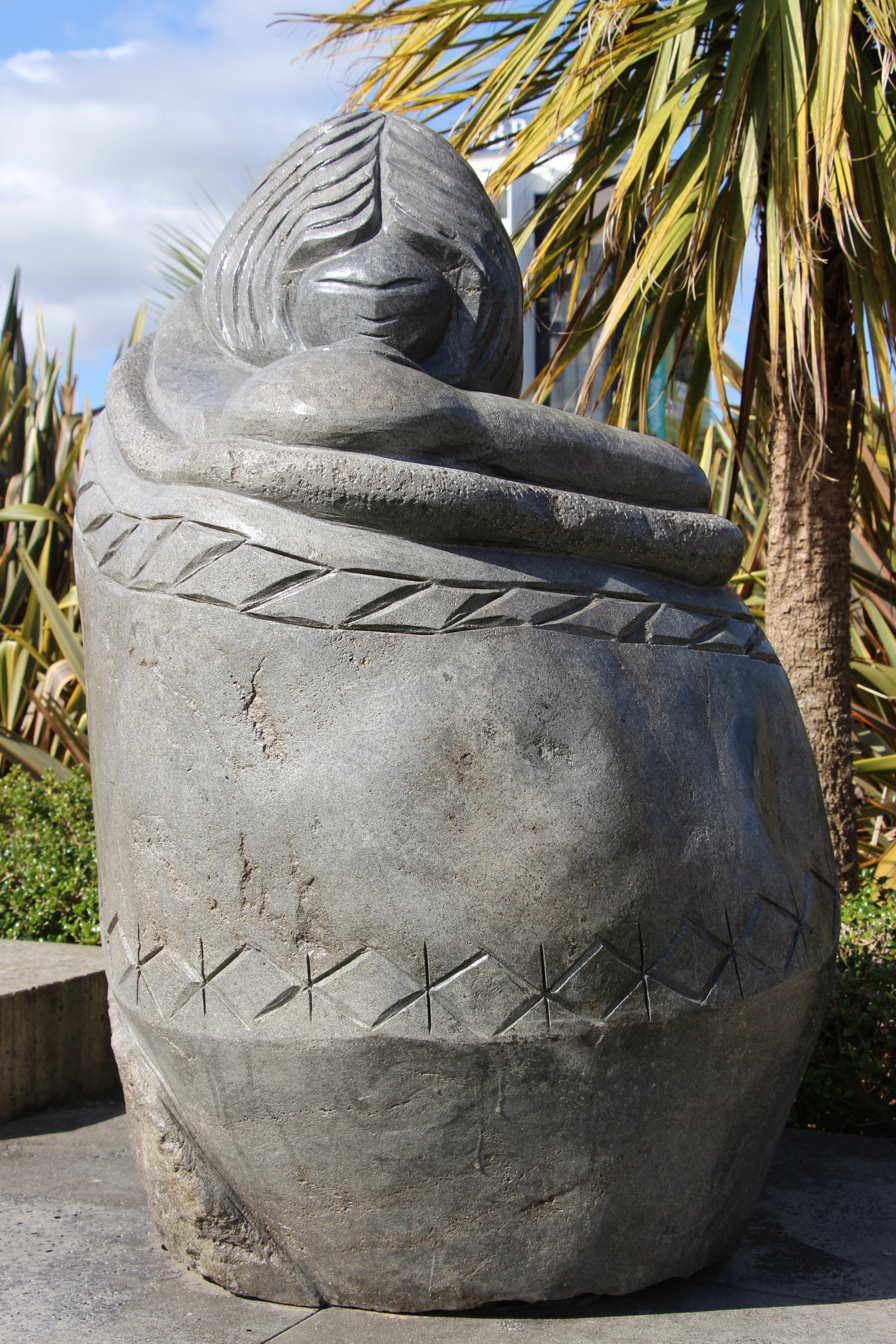
"Untitled" by Steven Gwaliasi
