= Nga Huruhuru Rangatira =

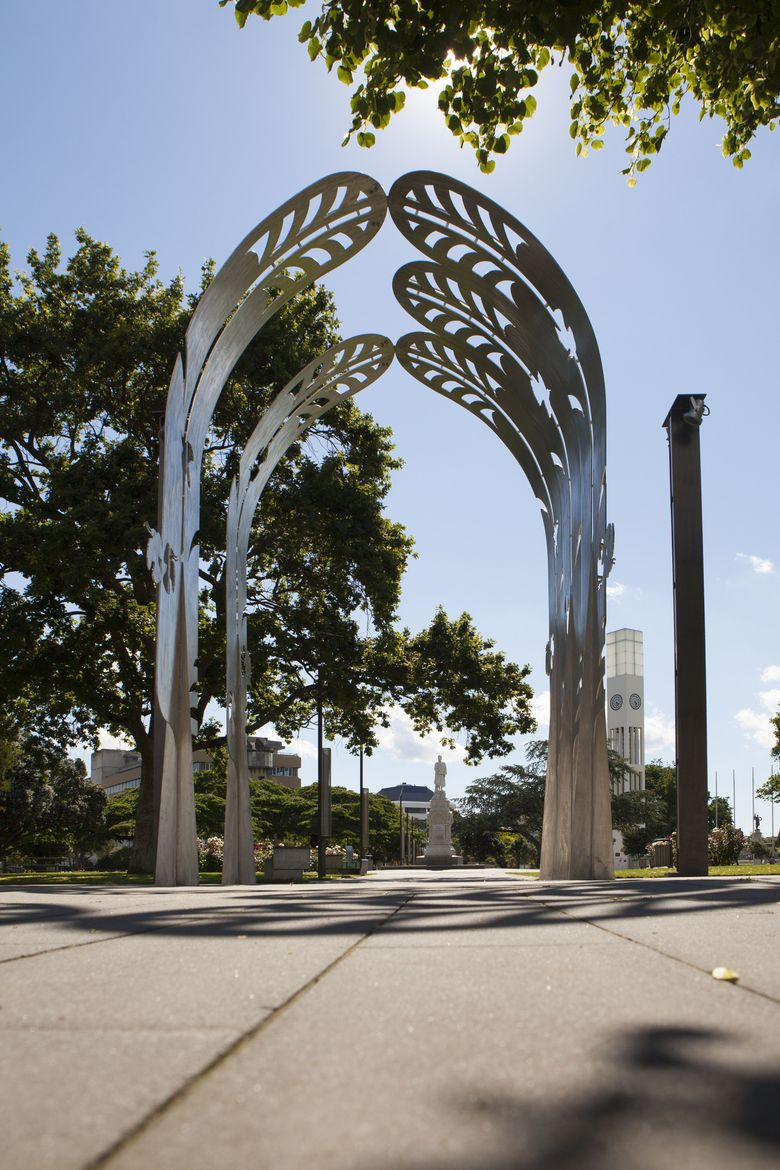
- Interactive map of Nga Huruhuru Rangatira
- Location: The Square, Palmerston North, New Zealand
- Coordinates: 40°21′24″S 175°36′45″E
- Designer: Bob Jahnke
- Material: Stainless steel
- Opening date: 2016

Nga Huruhuru Rangatira ("the feathers of the chief") is a stainless steel sculpture by Bob Jahnke located in The Square in Palmerston North, New Zealand. The sculpture consists of five large Huia feathers forming an archway leading towards the Te Peeti Te Awe Awe Memorial. The sculpture represents the coming together of Māori and Pākehā knowledge, and is decorated with cutouts of Huia.

The sculpture was installed in November 2016.
