= The Square, Palmerston North =

Public square in New Zealand

The Square
- Public square
- Te Marae o Hine (Māori)
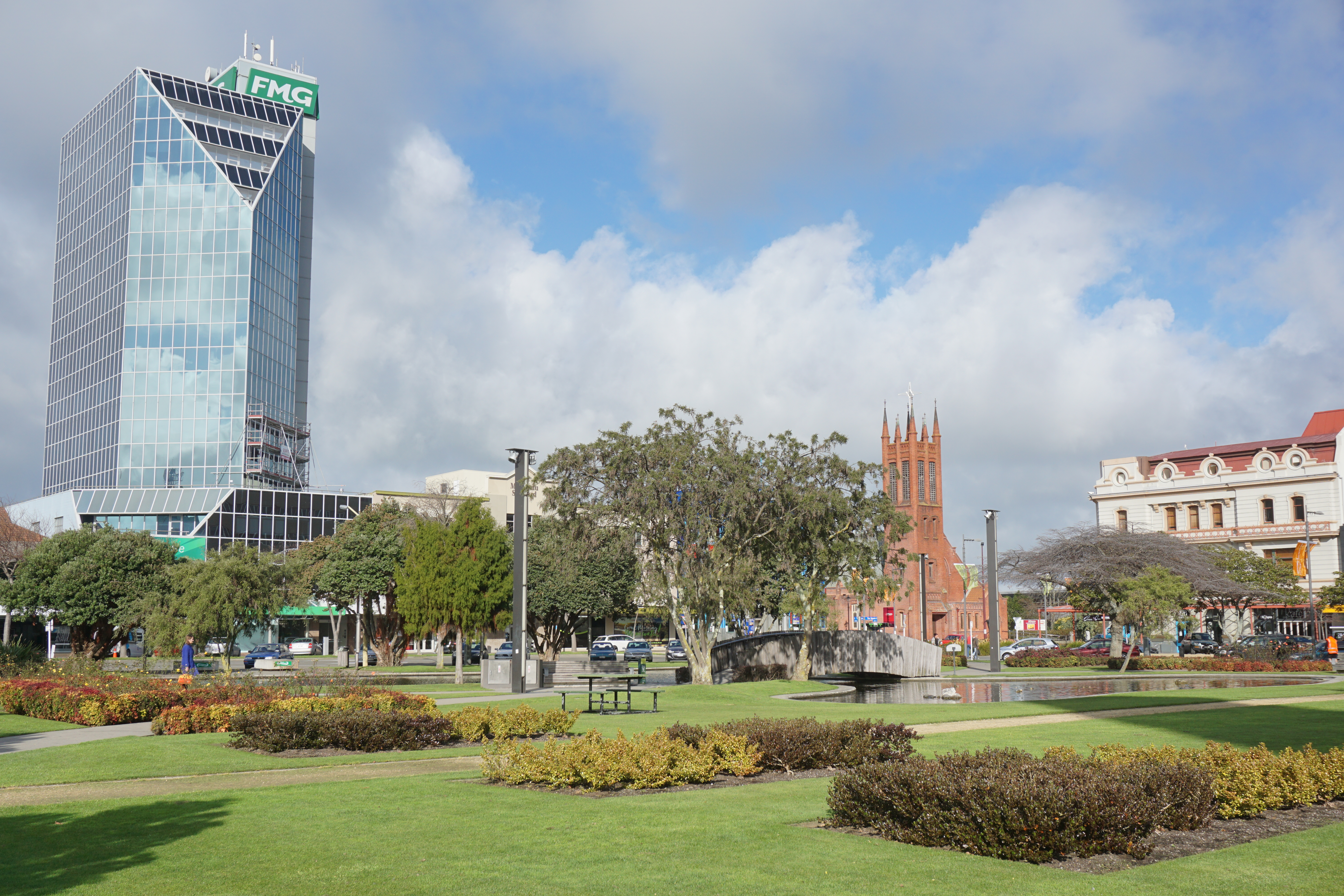
- The Square in 2015
- Location: Palmerston North, New Zealand
- Interactive map of The Square
- Coordinates: 40°21′22.36″S 175°36′40.25″E

The Square (Māori: Te Marae o Hine) is a public square in Palmerston North, New Zealand. It contains the Hopwood Clock Tower, Te Peeti Te Awe Awe Memorial, a memorial fountain and several works of art, including the Ghost Tower and the PRiME sculptures. The North Island Main Trunk previously ran through The Square, and there was a railway station, but the tracks were removed in the 1960s.

== Rail history ==
A train in The Square during Palmerston North's 75th jubilee celebrations

The North Island Main Trunk previously ran through The Square, and a railway station was opened in the area in 1875 but was moved to Main Street in 1890. In the 1960s, Palmerston North railway station opened on the Milson deviation, leading to the last use of The Square by a passenger train in 1964, which was witnessed by thousands of people. The railway tracks were subsequently removed.

== Coronation Memorial Fountain ==
There is a non-functioning fountain in The Square known as the Coronation Memorial Fountain. It was built in 1902 to celebrate the coronation of King Edward VII, and also the 25th anniversary of the borough of Palmerston North. The fountain was designed by C.A Vautier, from Napier, and carved by Samuel Dowdall, a mason. In 1925 to 1926 it was moved from the centre of The Square to the west quadrant. The fountain was disabled in 1990, ceasing the use of water, and the pond near it was drained and converted into a garden. In 2005 the fountain was moved to The Square's north quadrant.

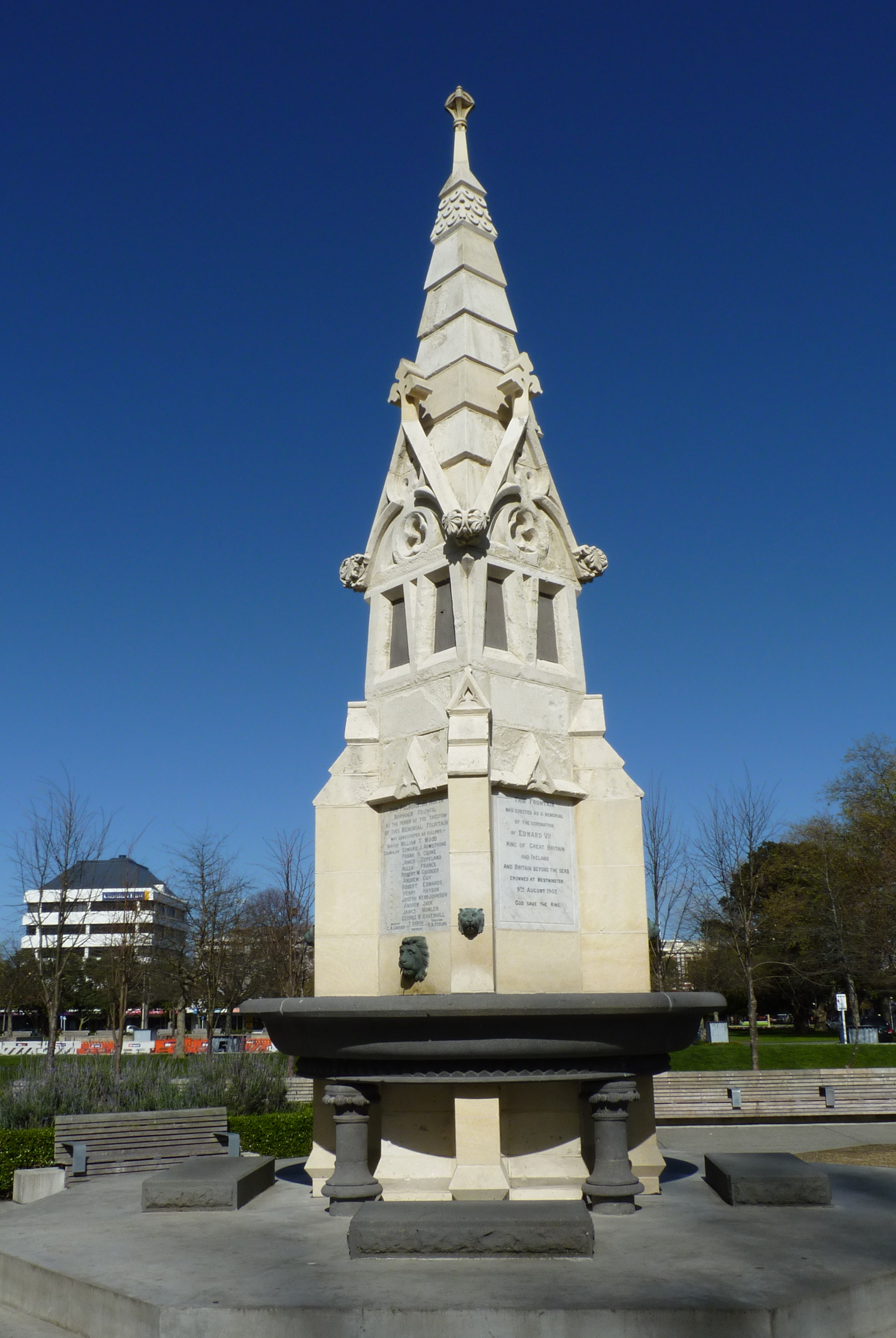
The fountain in 2014

== Hopwood Clock Tower ==
The Hopwood Clock Tower was completed in The Square in 1957. It is named after Arthur Hopwood, who gave £10,000 to the city in 1953 to build the clock tower. Palmerston North had a clock tower before this, but it had to be demolished as a result of the 1942 Wairarapa earthquakes. A cross was added to the current clock tower in the early 1990s, and in 2007 the tower was refurbished, adding a lantern lighting system. The lighting is changed on national holidays (such as Anzac Day), and other events. Registered charities can request that the lighting be changed for a day of significance, an example being Earth Day.

== Te Peeti Awe Awe Memorial ==
In the southeast corner of The Square there is a marble statue of Te Peeti Te Aweawe, which was installed in 1907. He was a chief of the Rangitāne iwi, and is known for his involvement in the negotiations to sell Māori land in the Manawatū to pākehā settlers. Since 1982 the statue has been recognised by Heritage New Zealand as a Category 2 historic place.

== War memorial ==
There is a war memorial in the centre of The Square. It was built in 1926 to commemorate local soldiers who died in the First World War, but since then, names of soldiers who died in the Second World War, Korean and Vietnam wars have been added. In total, there are over 400 names. The memorial was designed by Ferdinand Blundstone, of London, and has been described as a near-replica of a similar memorial he created in 1922 for Folkestone in Kent, England. The memorial features a bronze statue of a female figure, representing "sorrowing motherhood".

== Public art ==
=== Ghost Tower ===
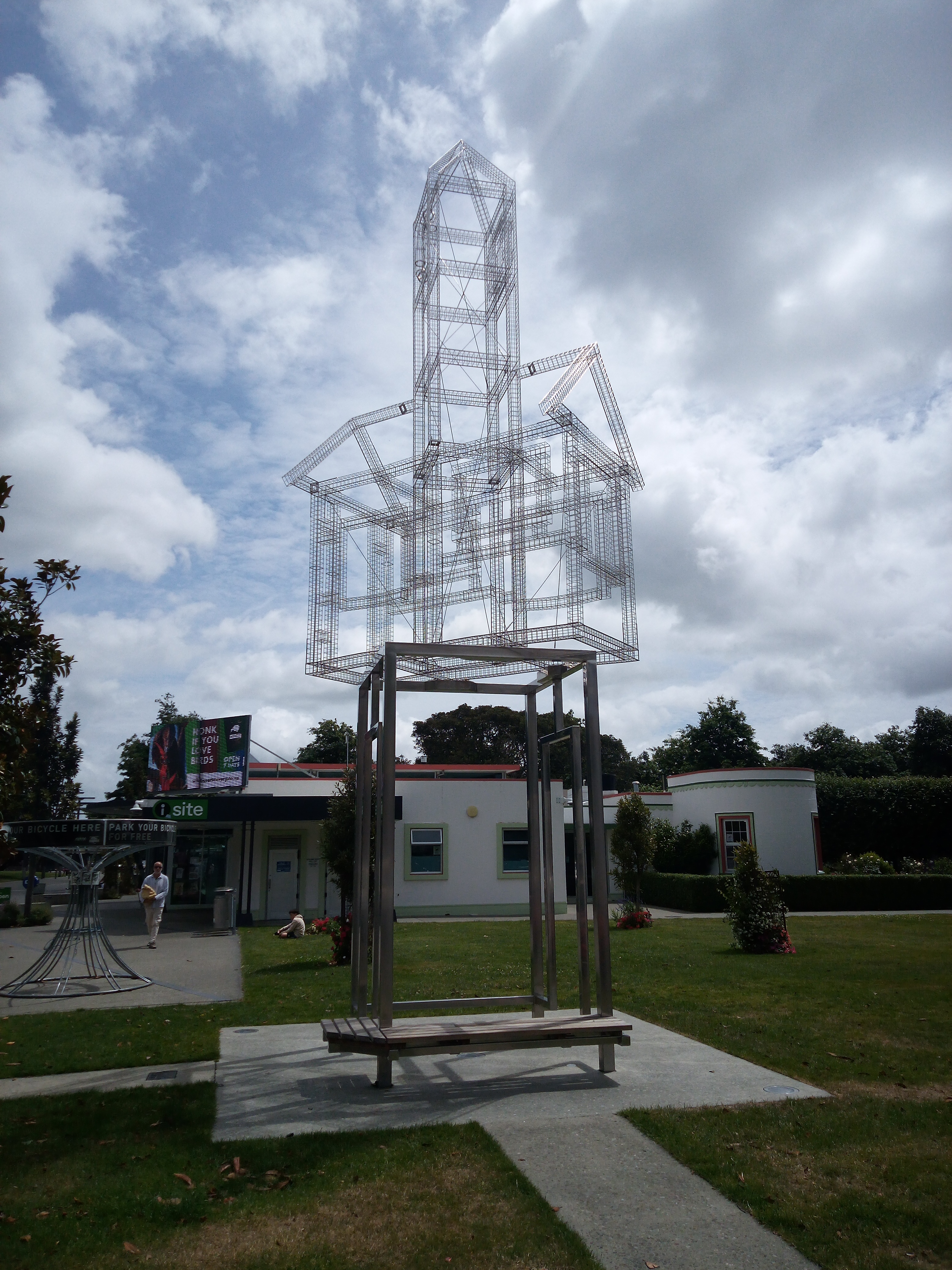
Ghost Tower in 2025

In the east side of The Square is a sculpture named the Ghost Tower. It has a hollow stainless steel tower that sits on a frame. Overall, the sculpture is 9.4 metres (31 ft) and the stand is 3.5 metres (11 ft) tall. The stand has a seat. The sculpture was installed in April 2014, but was blown over by winds a week later. It was re-installed in July 2015.

=== PRiME sculptures ===
There are 10 sculptures in The Square known as the PRiME sculptures. They were created by several sculptors in the year 2000. For some time they were near Te Rangimarie Marae while bases for the sculptures were being made, and in 2006 they were moved back to The Square.

=== Posts ===
There are a series of posts with carvings in The Square, created in 1990 to honour The Square's Māori name, Te Marae o Hine. They were created in 1990 by John Bevan Ford. On two of the posts, the outward-facing carvings represent a welcoming by Rangitāne, and the inward-facing carvings depict Te Rongorito and Hineaupounamu.

== Public bathroom ==
Public bathroom building in 2014

In The Square is an Art Deco public bathroom and information centre. It was built in 1936, in the location of older public toilets that opened in 1918. The 1936 building had toilets, rest, feeding and changing rooms, to be used by women, as the men's facilities were separate. Female attendants formerly worked at the building. People had to pay a penny to use the facilities, until 1967 when the fee was removed during New Zealand's currency decimalisation. In 2004 an information centre was added to the building, and so were unisex toilets. As of 2026, Heritage New Zealand is planning on listing the toilets as a Category 2 historic place.
