= Ghost Tower (sculpture) =

Sculpture in Palmerston North, New Zealand

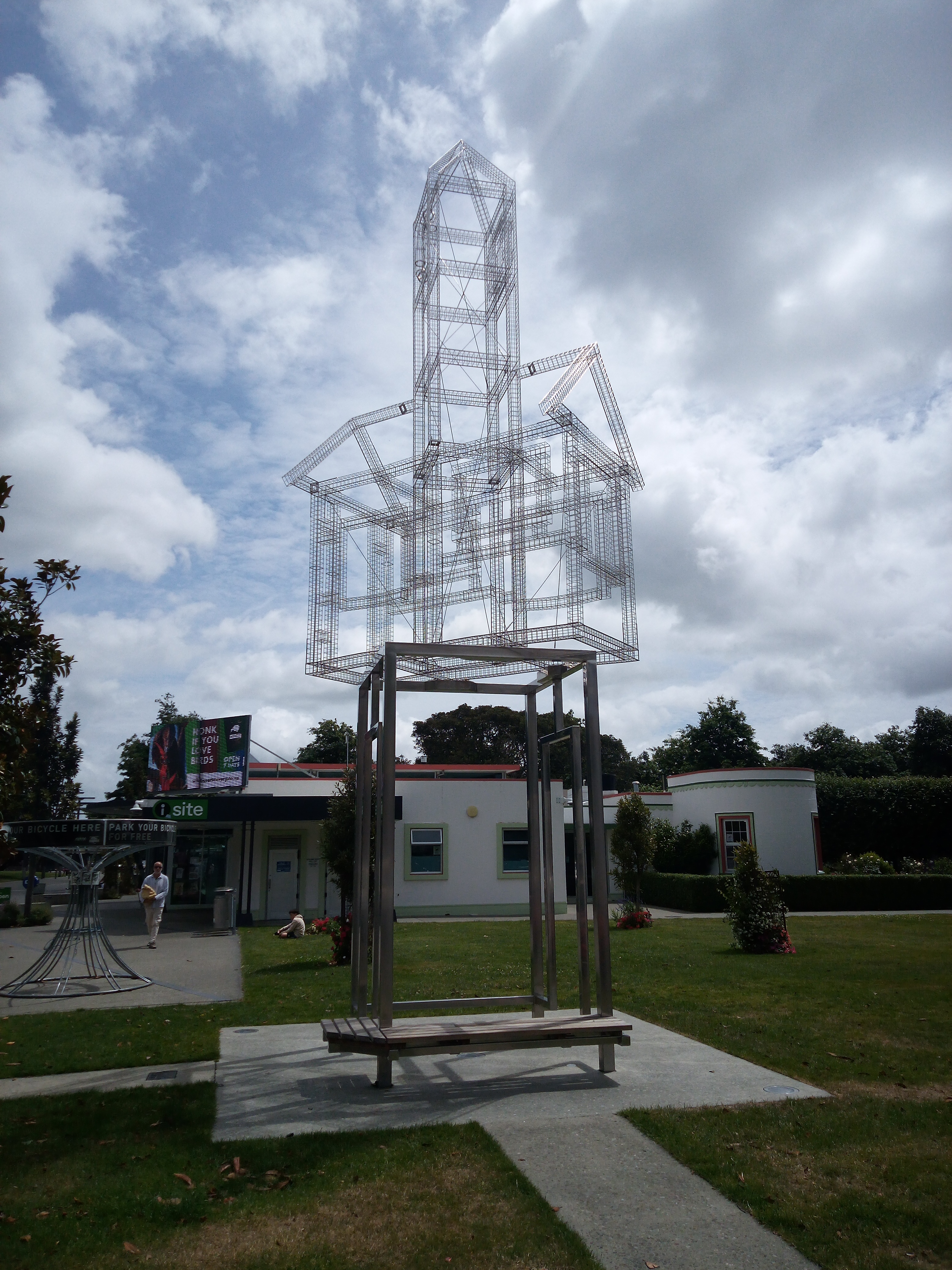
- Interactive map of Ghost Tower
- Location: The Square, Palmerston North, New Zealand
- Coordinates: 40°21′20″S 175°36′42″E
- Designer: Louise Purvis
- Material: Stainless Steel
- Opening date: 2014

Ghost Tower is a stainless steel sculpture by Louise Purvis located on the East side of The Square in Palmerston North, New Zealand. It is a meshwork tower formed from hollow stainless steel tubing, standing on a solid metal frame, with an overall height of 9.4 metres.

The sculpture was installed in April 2014. Its inspirations included the Palmerston North clock tower, and the transmission tower on Wharite Peak. The sculpture originally cost $100,000, paid for by the Palmerston North City Council and Palmerston North Public Sculpture Trust. A week after its installation the tower was blown over in a storm. A subsequent investigation found that the tower had not been secured properly in the rush to erect it, and that this failure had put the public at risk.

The tower was re-erected in July 2015.
