= Warren Warbrick =

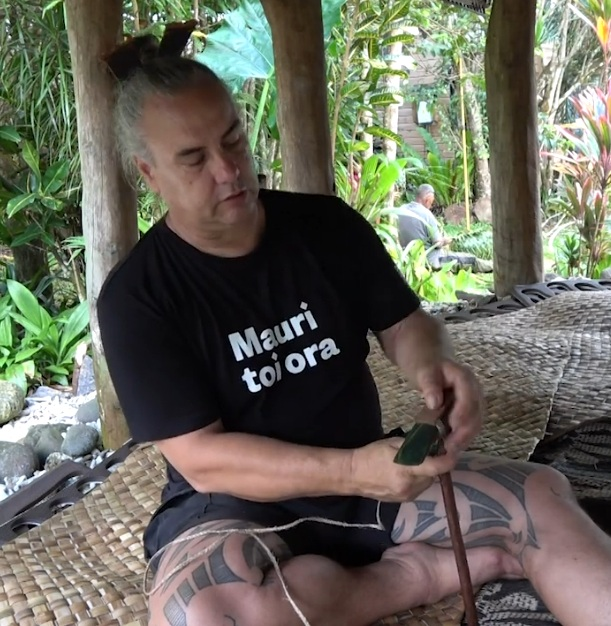
Warbrick hafting an adze

Warren Manu Kirk Warbrick (born 1966) is a New Zealand artist, carver, and experimental archaeologist. Examples of his work are held at Te Manawa, Palmerston North and are on public display throughout Palmerston North and the Manawatū.

Warbrick is of Rangitāne descent. His interest in Māori stone tools began when he was 12, after observing museum specimens. He later became a self-taught carver and toolmaker, creating replica tools and Taonga pūoro. He was hired as an exhibitions officer at the then-Manawatu Museum by Mina McKenzie, and while there he was mentored by carver John Bevan Ford. In 1990 he assisted Ford in carving the Rangitane Guardians, a series of pou depicting the history of Te Marae o Hine. During a restoration in 2021 he carved two replacements, depicting Te Rongorito and Hineaupounamu.

In 2017 he was commissioned to carve a series of pou for Palmerston North's Ahimate park.

In 2018 he and his partner Virginia performed KONO: Song Cycle of a New Town at the Edinburgh Fringe Festival. The piece was later performed at the Palmy Fringe Festival.

In 2025 he was commissioned to create three pieces of art for the new Te Ahu a Turanga – Manawatū Tararua Highway.

== Works ==
- Rangitane Guardians (1990) (with John Bevan Ford) - Te Marae o Hine, Palmerston North
- Turanga-i-mua (1998) - Te Manawa
- Hoani Meihana Te Rangiotu (2000) - Te Marae o Hine, Palmerston North
- Hine-te-Iwaiwa (2025) - western end of Te Ahu a Turanga – Manawatū Tararua Highway.
- Tuia Te Tangata (2025) - Te Ahu a Turanga – Manawatū Tararua Highway.

== Gallery ==
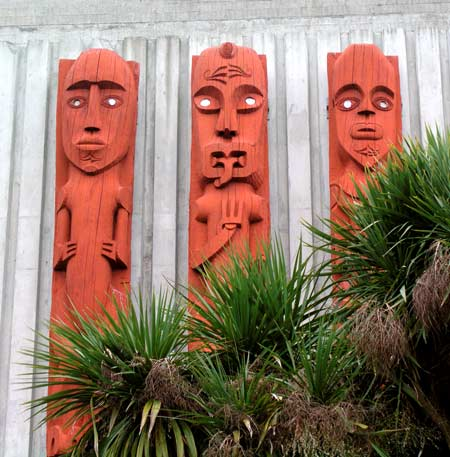
Rangitane Guardians

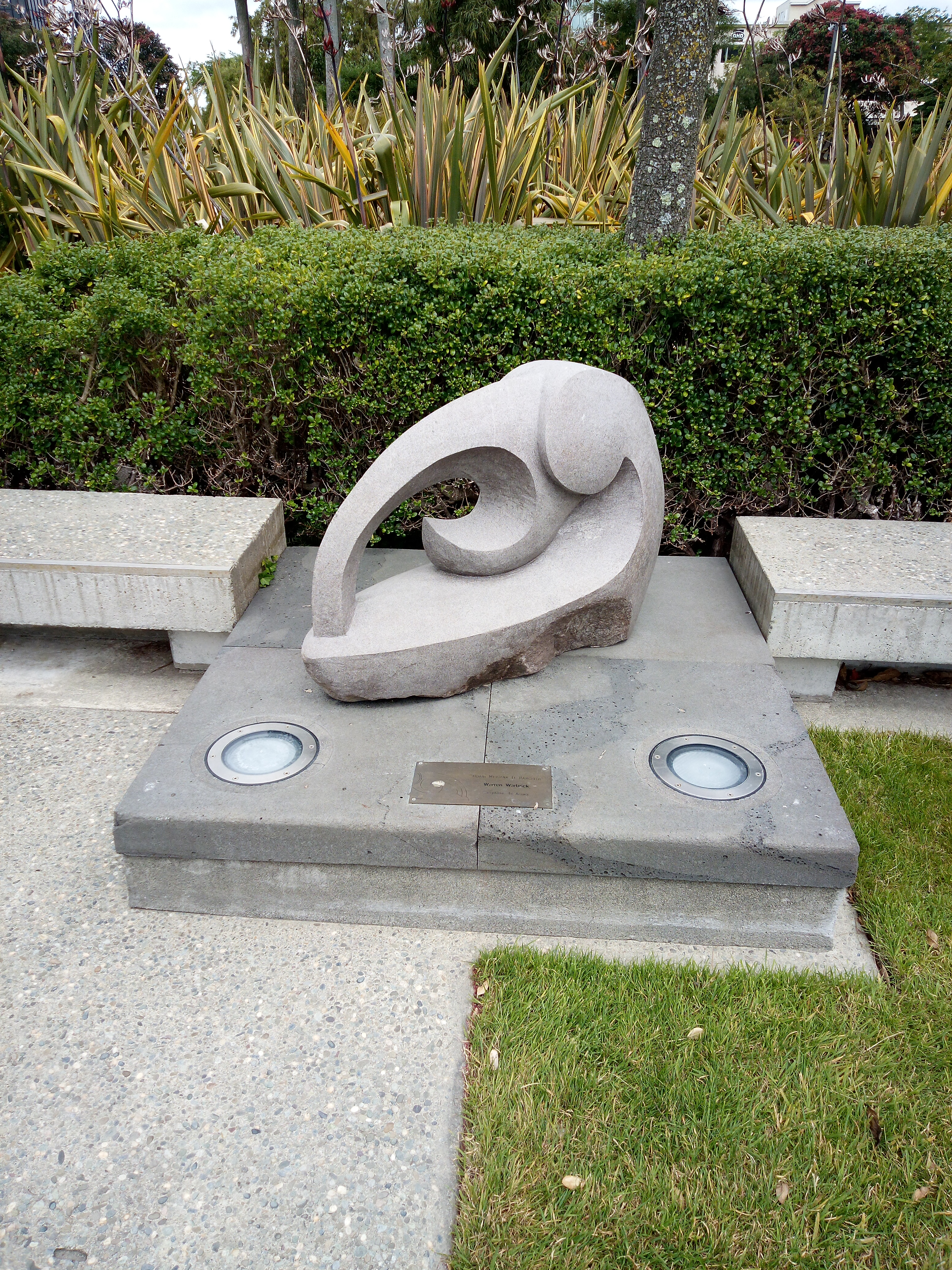
Hoani Meihana Te Rangiotu

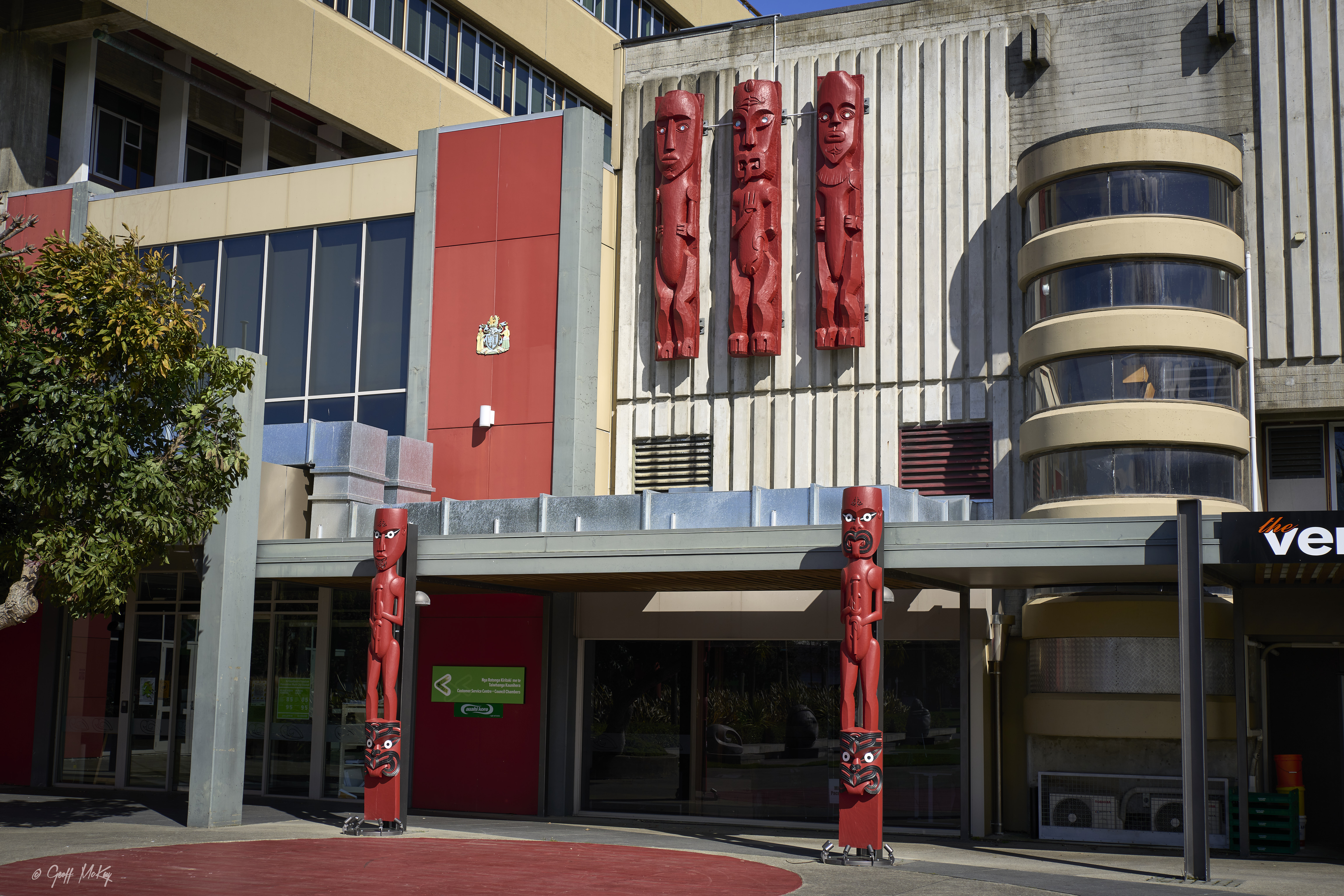
Te Rongorito and Hineaupounamu

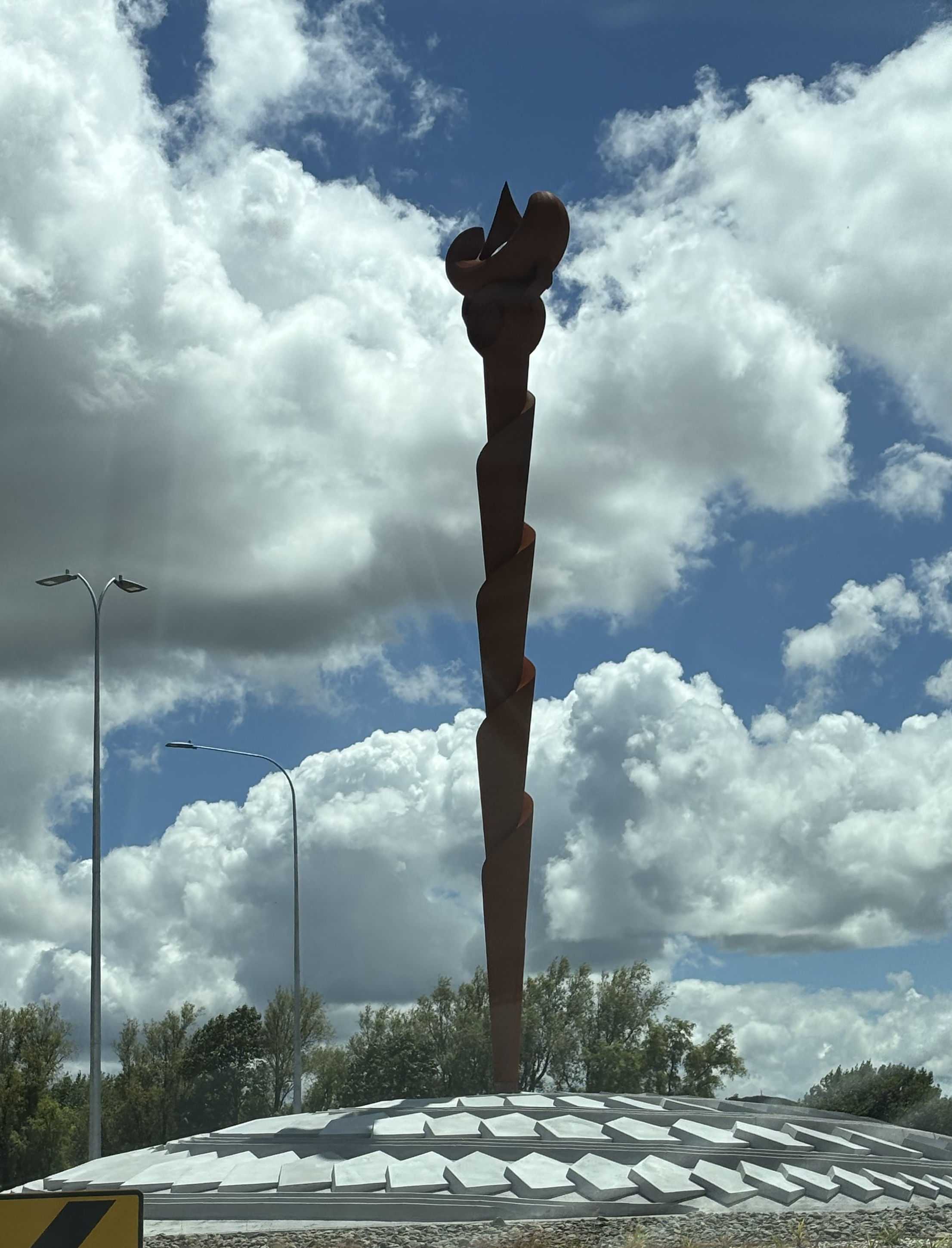
Hine-te-Iwaiwa

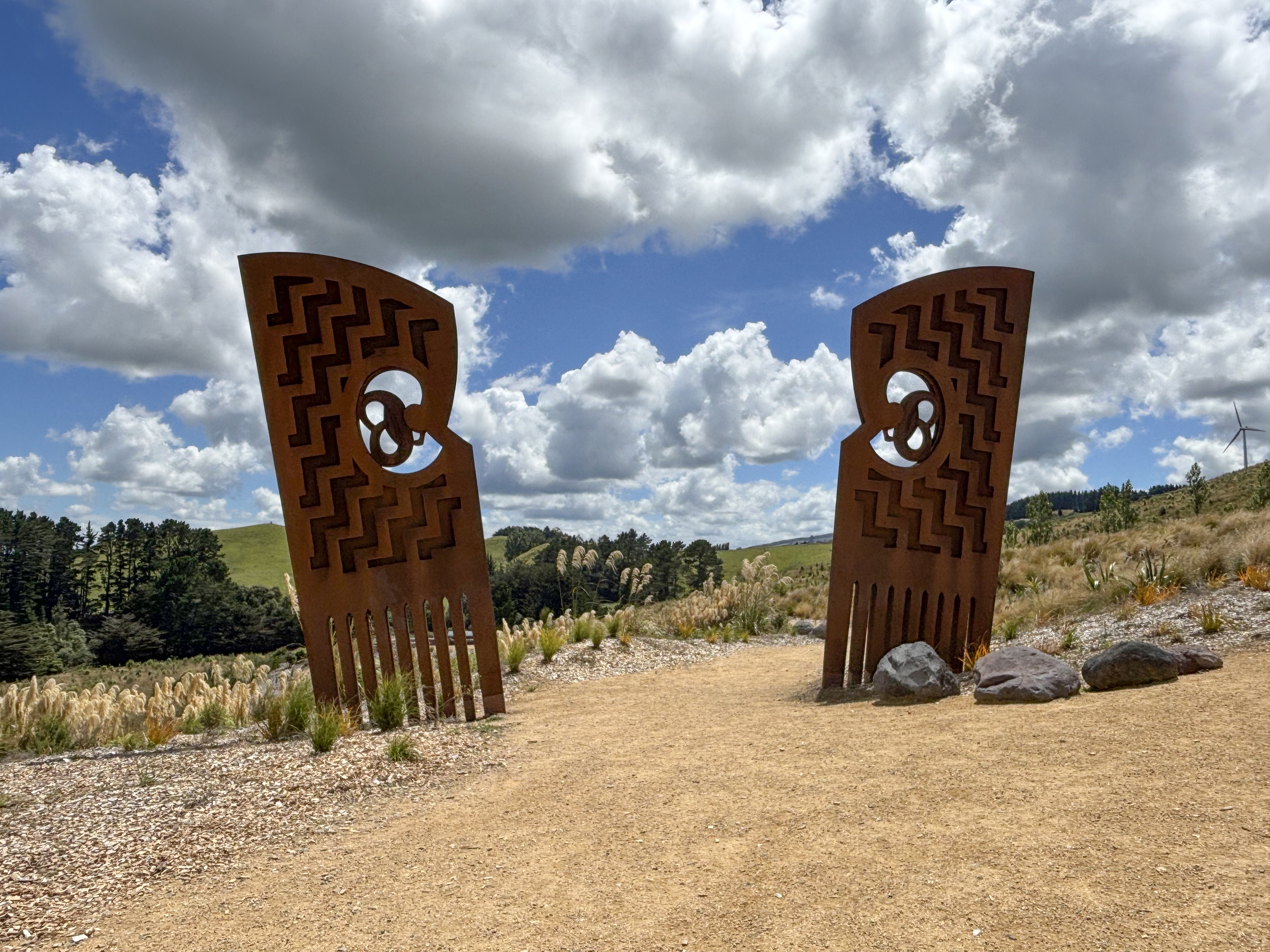
Tuia Te Tangata
