= Te Peeti Te Awe Awe Memorial =

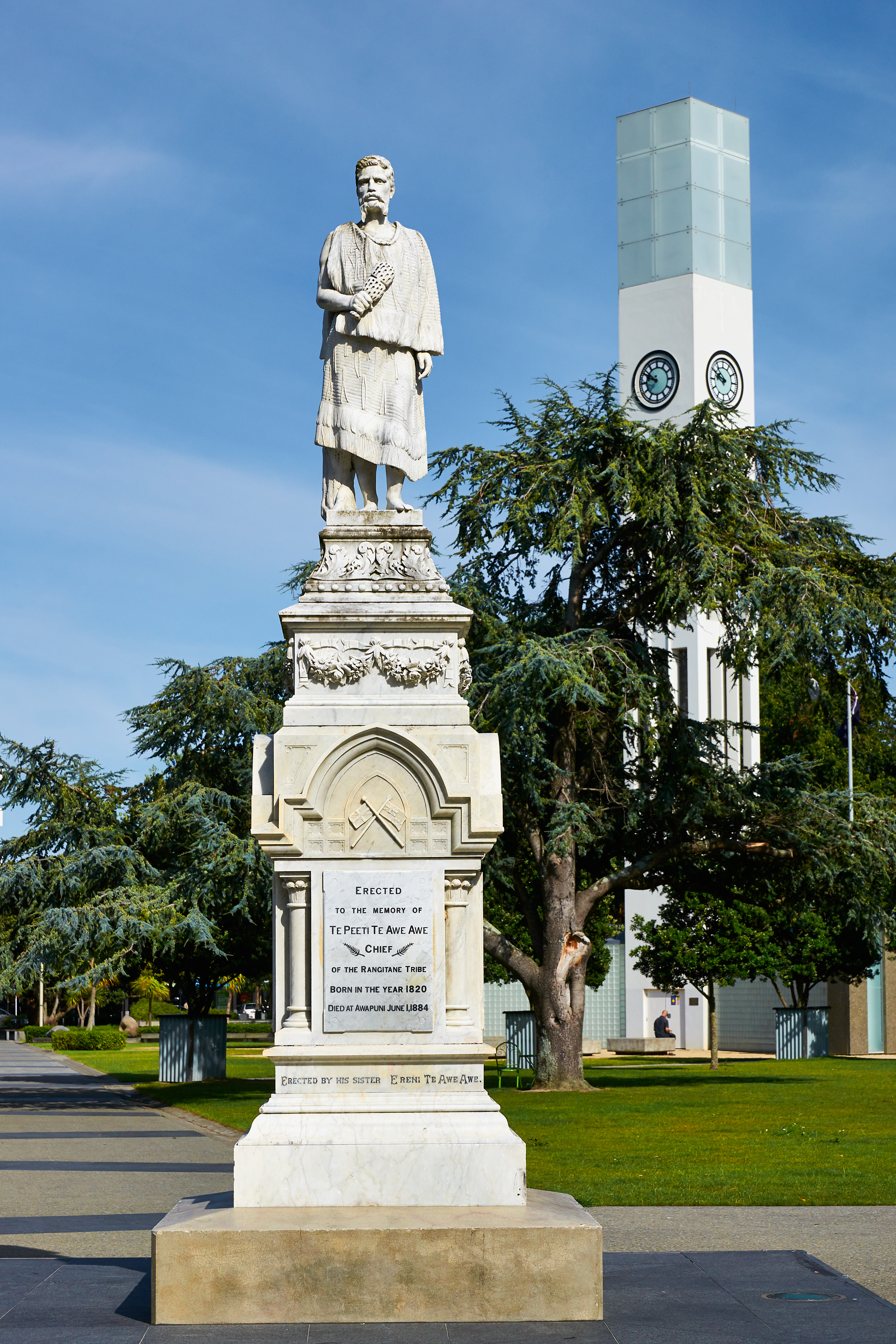
- Interactive map of Te Peeti Te Awe Awe Memorial
- Location: Palmerston North, New Zealand
- Coordinates: 40°21′24″S 175°36′44″E
- Material: Carrara marble
- Opening date: 1907

The Te Peeti Te Awe Awe Memorial is a Carrara marble statue in The Square in Palmerston North, New Zealand. It is dedicated to Te Peeti Te Aweawe, a significant figure in Palmerston North's history. It is listed as a category 2 historic place by Heritage New Zealand.

The memorial stands about 20 feet high, and consists of a concrete base, a 10-foot marble plinth, and a slightly larger than life size statue of Te Awe Awe. Three sides of the plinth bear inscriptions, one naming Te Awe Awe, one giving his military record, and one with a famous quote attributed to him:

I have done my duty do you likewise... I have laid the foundation of friendship for your consummation.

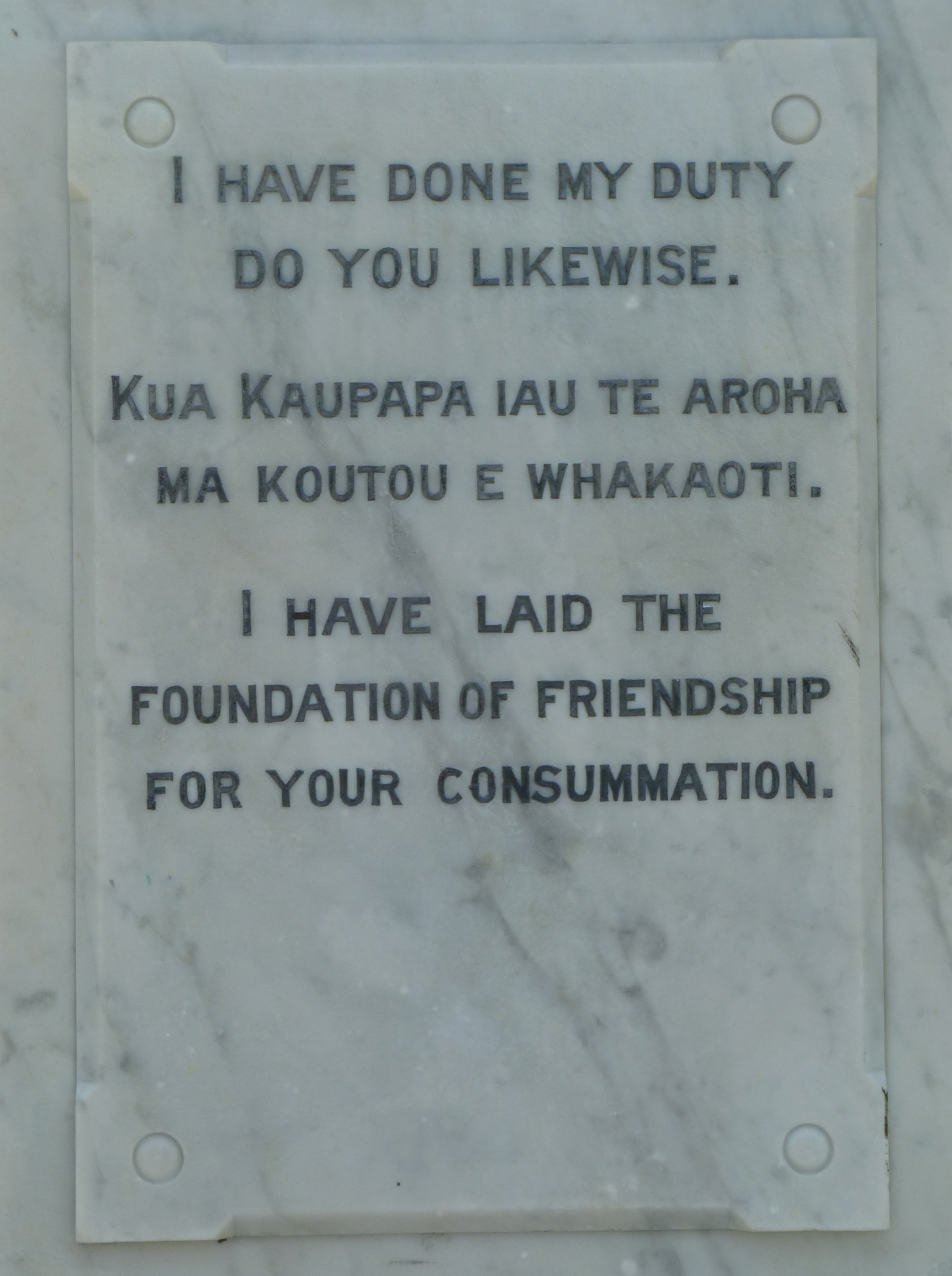
Te Peeti Te Awe Awe's famous words.

The memorial was commissioned in 1905 by Ereni Te Awe Awe, Te Peeti's younger sister. It was designed by Palmerston North artist Harold Anderson, and local stonemason Samuel Dowdall constructed the base and arranged the carving by an Italian sculptor. It was unveiled in January 1907 by Native Minister James Carroll.
