= Johnny Penisula =

New Zealand artist

Johnny Penisula MNZM
- Born: 8 April 1941 Samoa
- Died: 14 May 2023 (aged 82) Invercargill, New Zealand
- Genre: Painting, sculpture
- Notable awards: Senior Pacific Arts (Arts Pasifika Awards)

John Reuelu Penisula MNZM (1941 - 2023), born Ioane Reuelu Penisula, was a contemporary Samoan stone sculptor and painter who lived in New Zealand.

Penisula was born in Samoa and began painting when he was 13 years old. He moved to New Zealand in 1962 and set up home in Invercargill. He studied art at night classes and began exhibiting as a painter in 1972. As a sculptor, he experimented with a diverse range of sculptural materials including steel, aluminium, fibreglass, bone, argillite, greenstone and limestone before turning to his preferred medium of stone. His sculptures incorporate both traditional Polynesian and contemporary patterns, symbols that are significant in Pacific Islands history and culture.

== Exhibitions ==
His work is held in public and private collections, both in New Zealand and internationally, including a civic work in Invercargill's central Wachner Place commemorating the 150th anniversary of the Treaty of Waitangi. Penisula's work was part of Le Folauga: the past coming forward – Contemporary Pacific Art from Aotearoa New Zealand, the first exhibition of contemporary Pacific art from New Zealand to be shown in a major fine arts museum in Asia. Le Folauga opened at the Kaohsiung Museum of Fine Arts in Taiwan from 13 December 2008 to 5 April 2009. Penisula was also part of the official New Zealand delegation of artists participating in the 10th Festival of Pacific Arts, held in Pago Pago, American Samoa in 2008.

Penisula said his creative inspiration comes from his Samoan heritage.

== Awards and art residences ==
In 2002, Penisula received the Creative New Zealand Senior Pacific Arts award at the Arts Pasifika Awards in recognition of artistic excellence and contribution to the arts. In 2005, he was awarded the Cook Islands Artist in Residence by Creative New Zealand. In 2007, he was the recipient of the Macmillan Brown Pacific Artist in Residence at the University of Canterbury.

In the 2009 New Year Honours, Penisula was appointed a Member of the New Zealand Order of Merit, for services to art, in particular sculpture.

== Death ==
Peninsula died in May 2023, in Invercargill, New Zealand.
