= Te Ahu a Turanga – Manawatū Tararua Highway =

Road in New Zealand

State Highway 3
- Te Ahu a Turanga–Manawatū Tararua Highway
- Te Ahu a Turanga–Manawatū Tararua Highway in red; the previous main route (Saddle Road) is visible to the north of the highway.
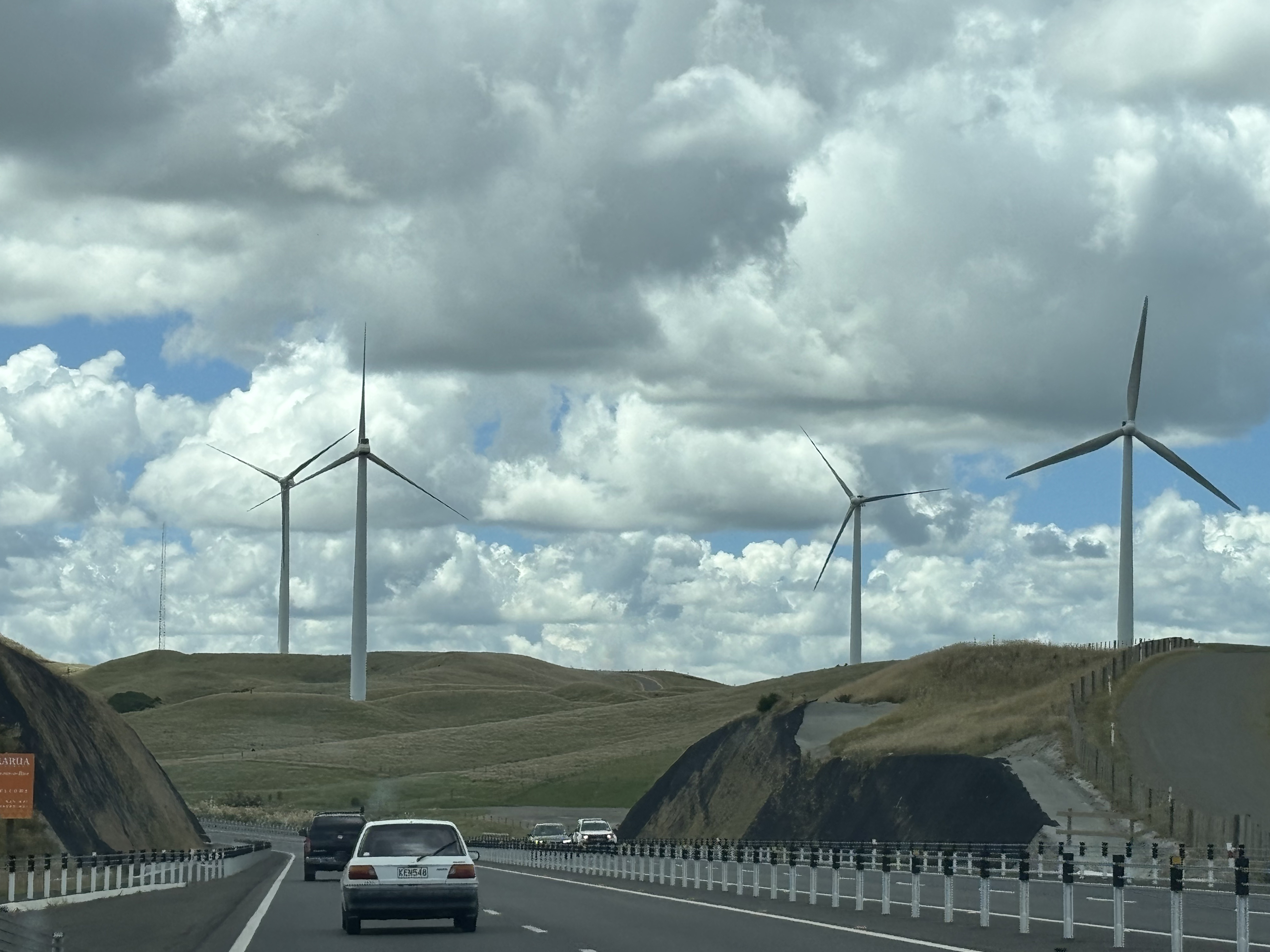

Route information
- Maintained by NZ Transport Agency Waka Kotahi
- Length: 11.5 km (7.1 mi)

Location
- Country: New Zealand

Highway system
- New Zealand state highways; Motorways and expressways; List

The Te Ahu a Turanga–Manawatū Tararua Highway is a 11.5-kilometre-long (7.1 mi), four-lane highway connecting Ashhurst and Woodville over the Ruahine Range following the closure of the Manawatū Gorge road in 2017. Construction began in January 2021 and the road was officially opened on 7 June 2025. It opened to traffic on 11 June 2025.

== History ==
=== Manawatū Gorge road ===
Previously, traffic travelling from the east and west of the central North Island used the Manawatū Gorge road, first opened in 1872. The road closed in 2004 and 2015, and also for more than a year from 2011 to 2012. On 24 April 2017, a slip from the Tararua Range cut off the road. Following more slips as workers were trying to fix previous ones, the NZ Transport Agency pulled workers from the area because of safety concerns. The road was never reopened. Before the gorge road closed, around 7,600 vehicles used the route daily, about 1,100 of which were trucks. The road permanently closed in July 2017 and traffic was then forced to use the steep, winding and windy Saddle Road, or the Pahiatua Track.

=== Te Ahu a Turanga–Manawatū Tararua Highway ===
In March 2018, the route was confirmed as the preferred option, running north of the old gorge between Ashhurst and Woodville, with an estimated NZD$350–$450 million construction cost at the time. Construction began in January 2021 and was completed in June 2025 at a final cost of $824.1 million.

A shared path for cyclists and walkers was constructed alongside the new highway. The path features a lookout on Parahaki Bridge, 30 m above the Manawatū River, which provides views of the river and the environment of the Manawatū Gorge.

=== Toll proposal ===
In August 2024, a tolling proposal was made by the NZ Transport Agency, following a government policy to increase new revenue streams for transport infrastructure. NZTA suggested $4.30 per trip for light vehicles and $8.60 for heavy vehicles. Many Woodville residents opposed the tolling, citing cost of living concerns. In December 2024, Minister of Transport Simeon Brown confirmed the tolling proposal would not go ahead.

=== Opening ===
On 7 June 2025, the Te Ahu a Turanga–Manawatū Tararua Highway reopened with a karakia performed by representatives of five local iwi (Māori tribes). Transport Minister Chris Bishop and Horizons Regional Council Chair Rachel Keedwell also attended the opening ceremony.

== Gallery ==
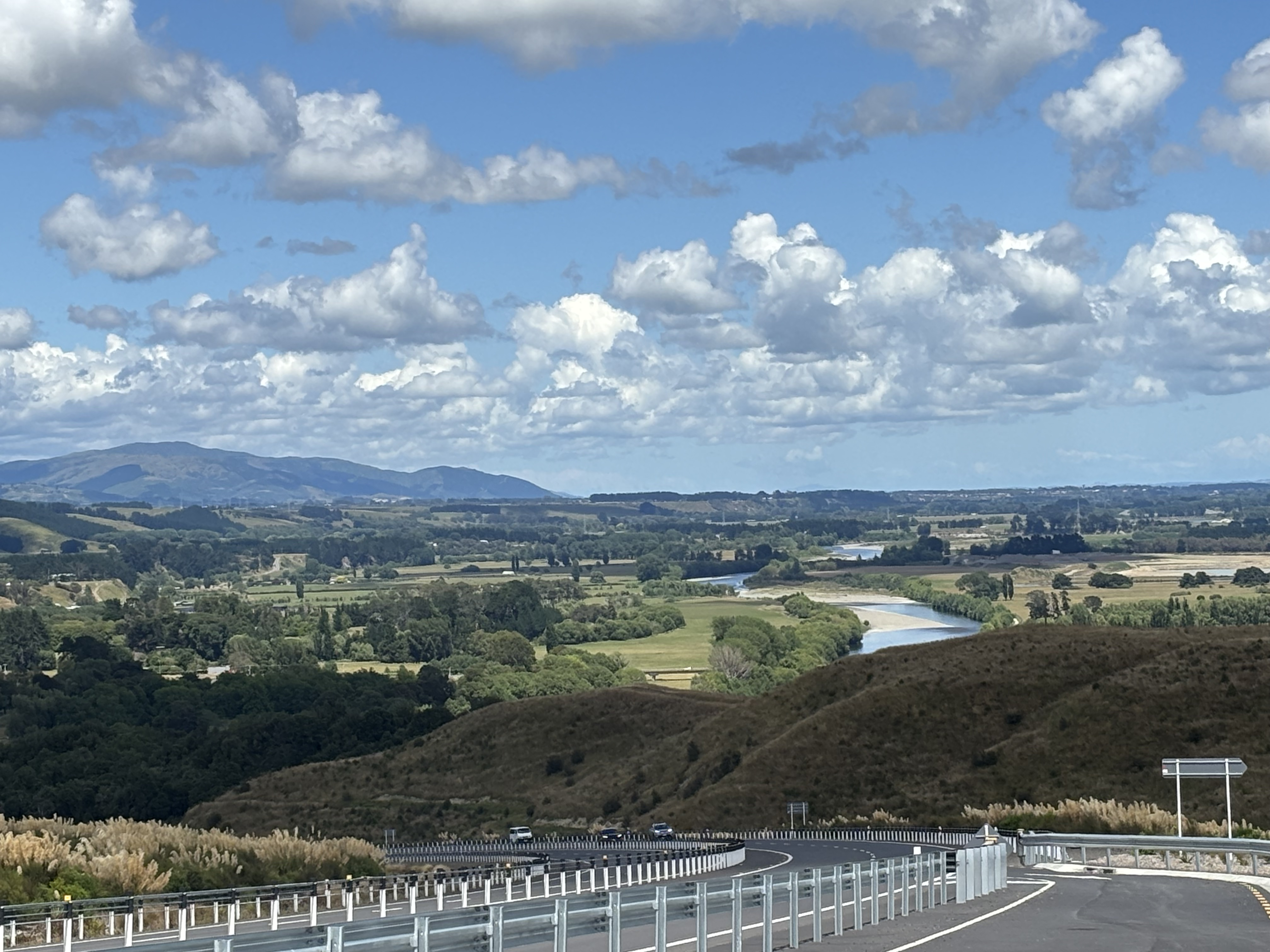

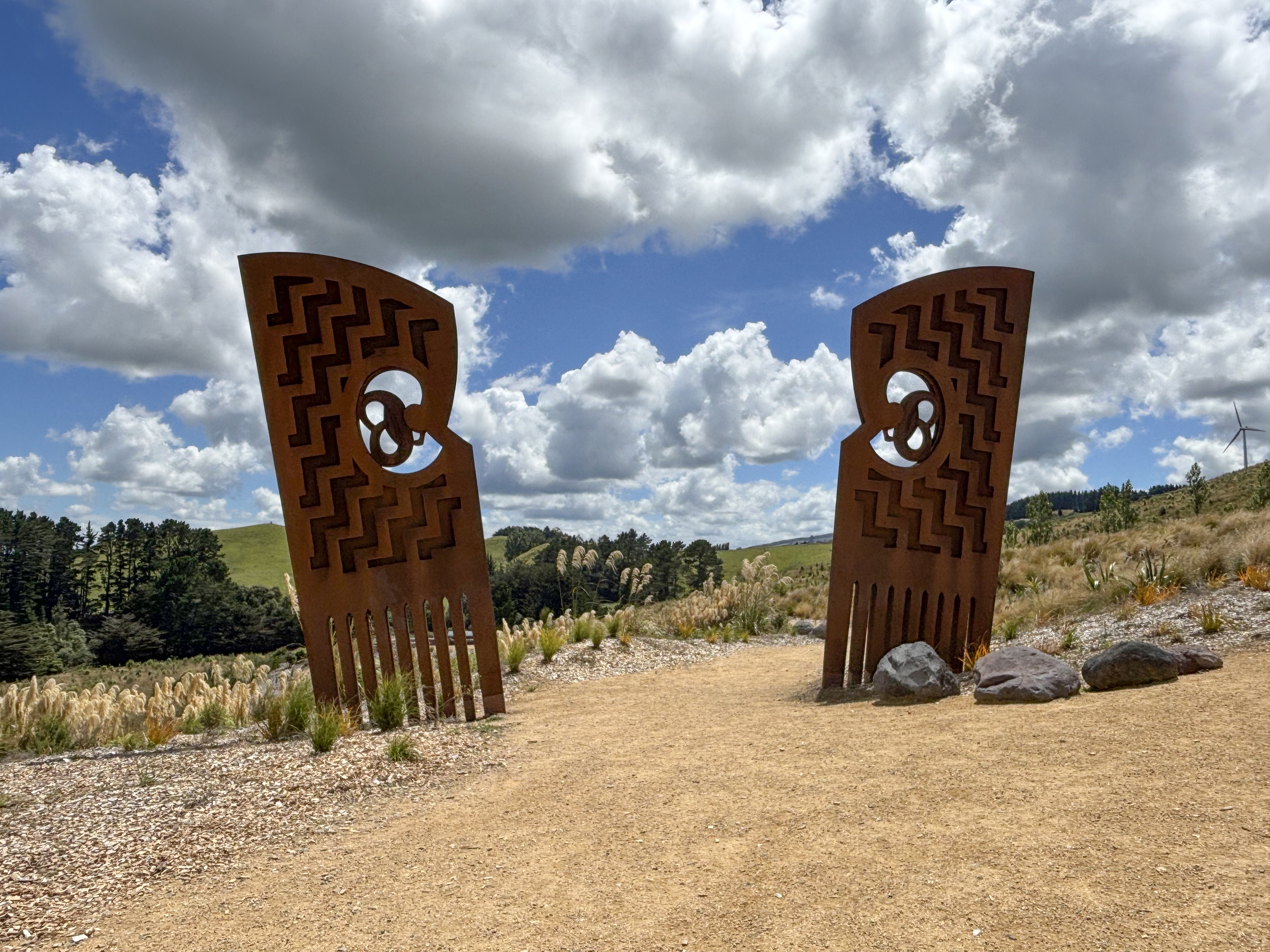

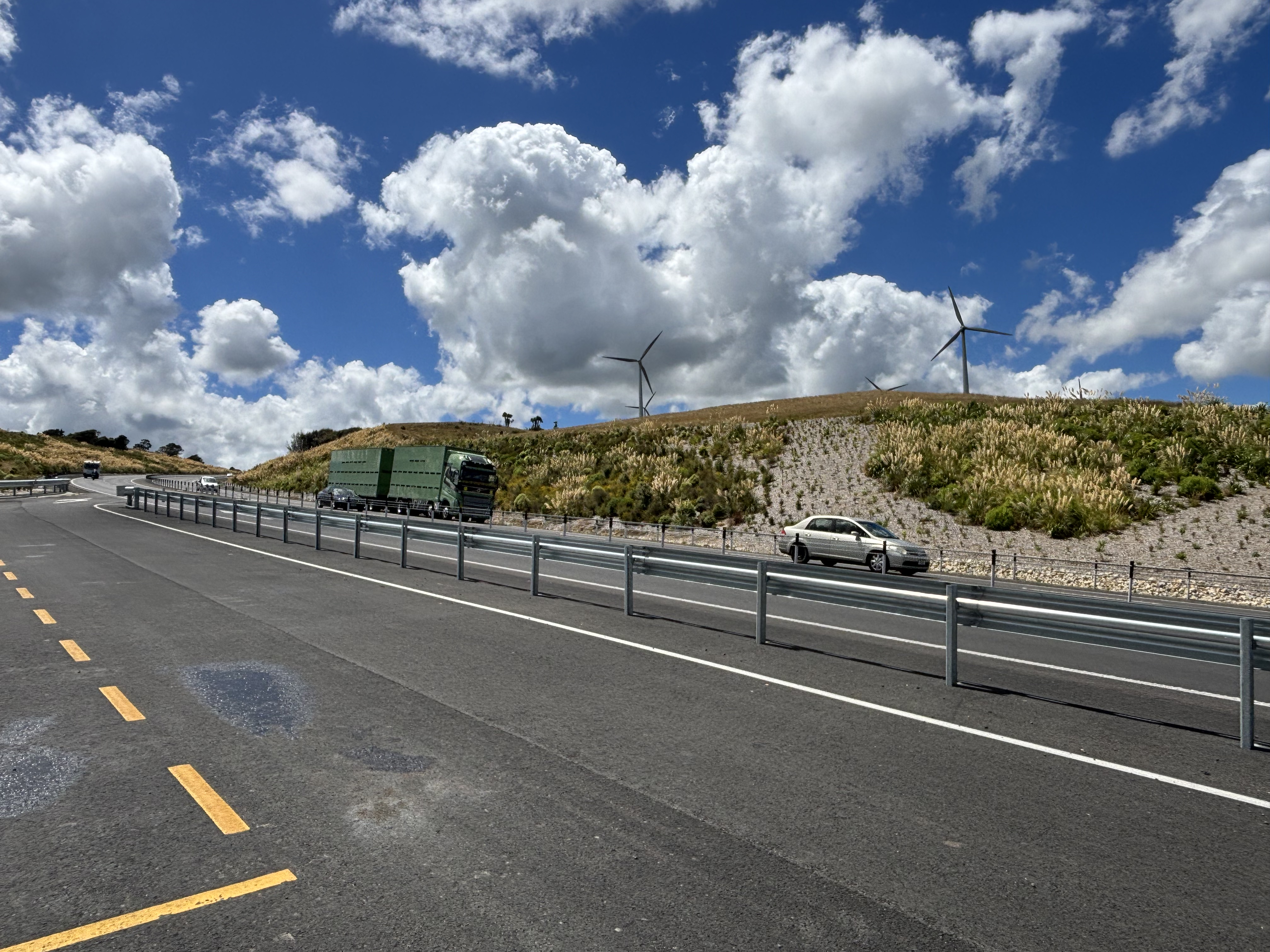

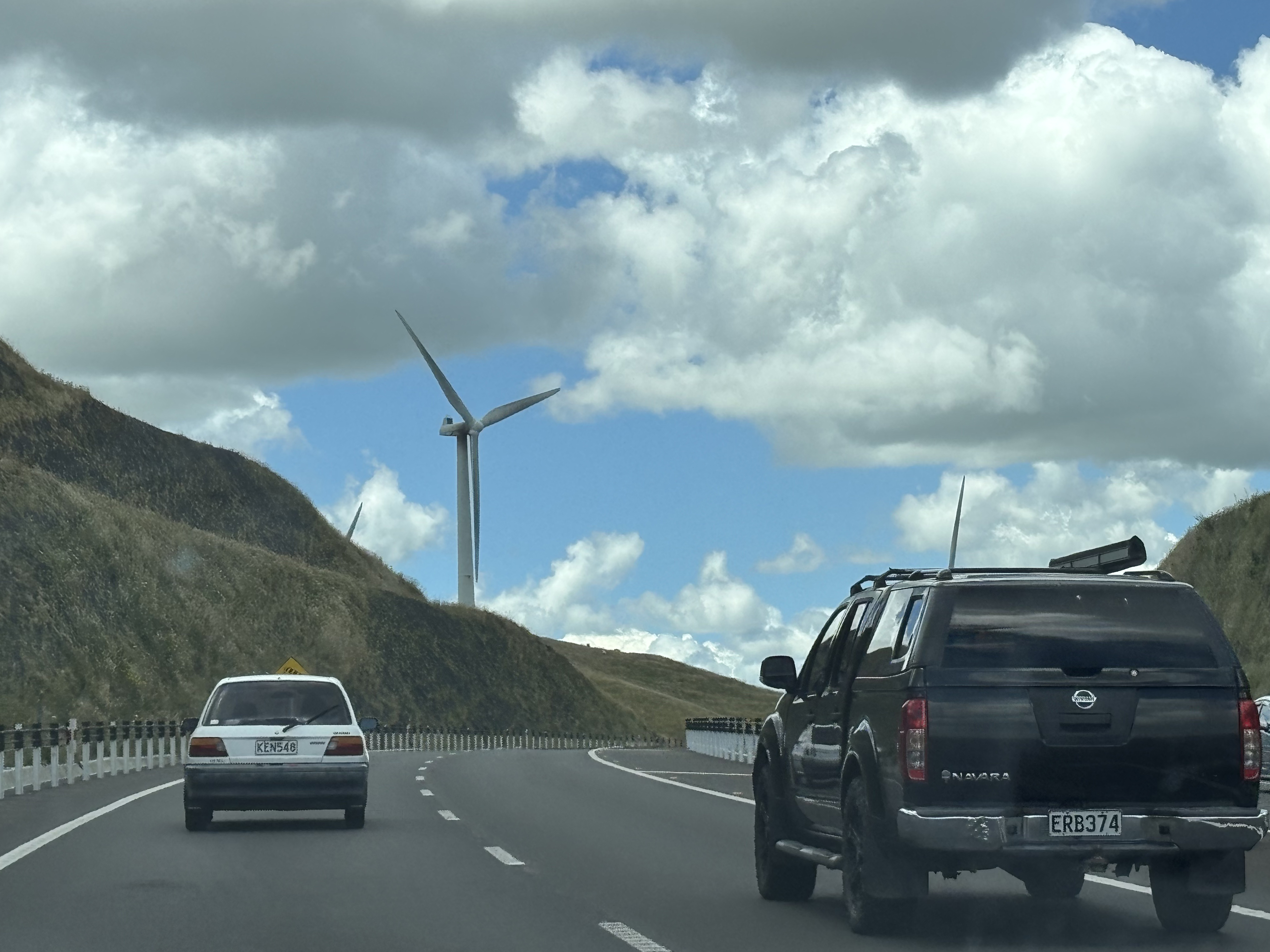

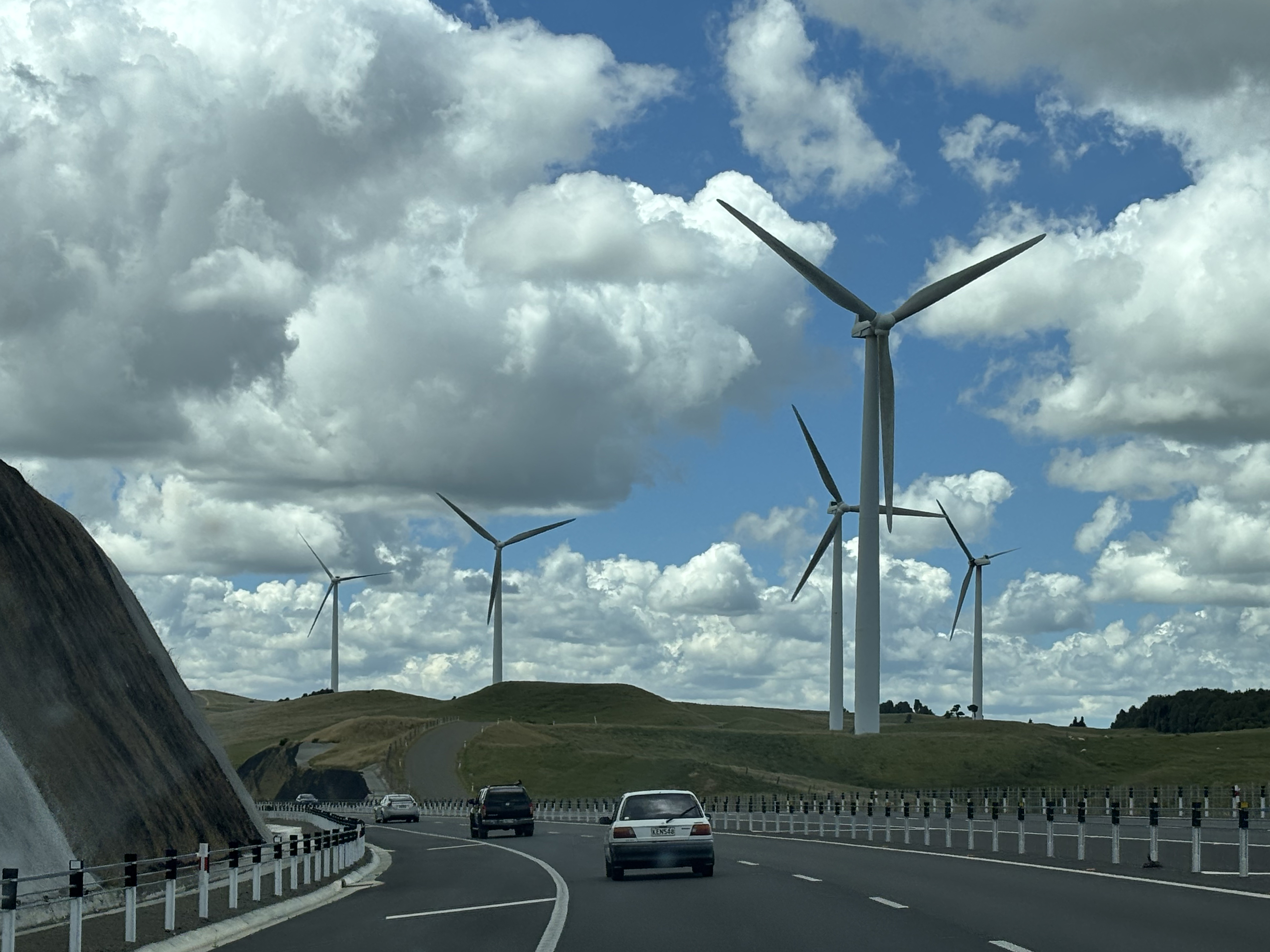

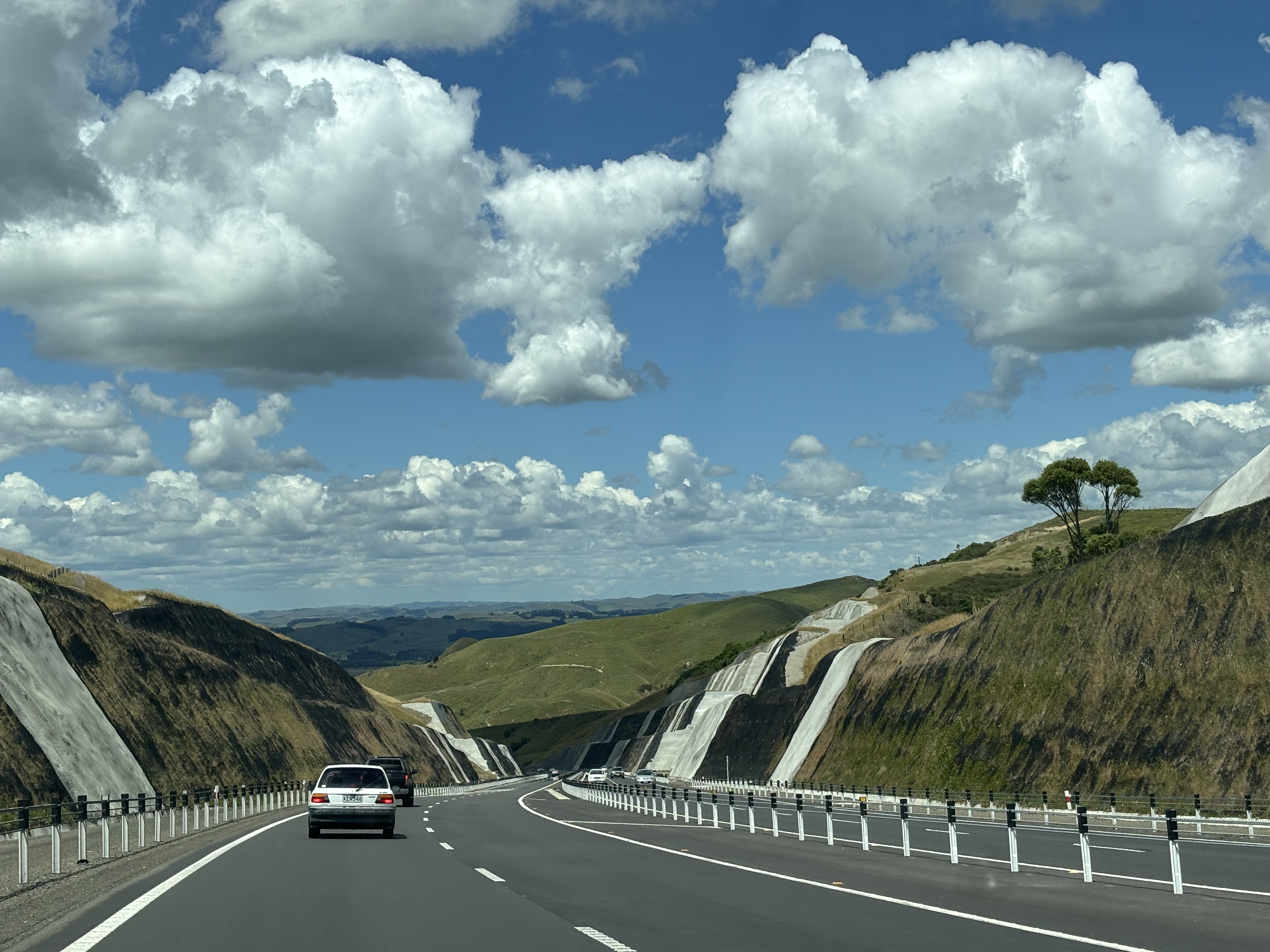

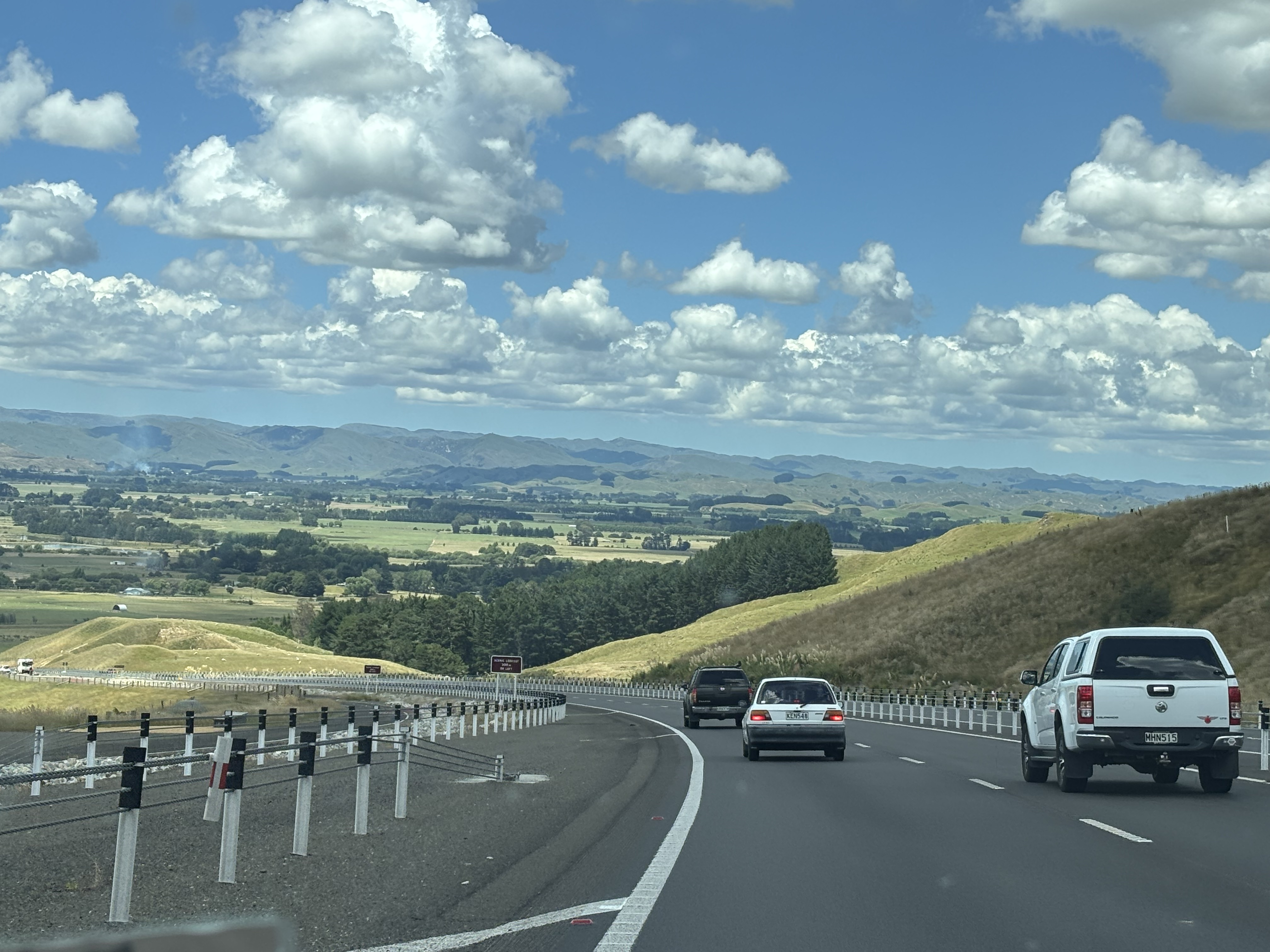

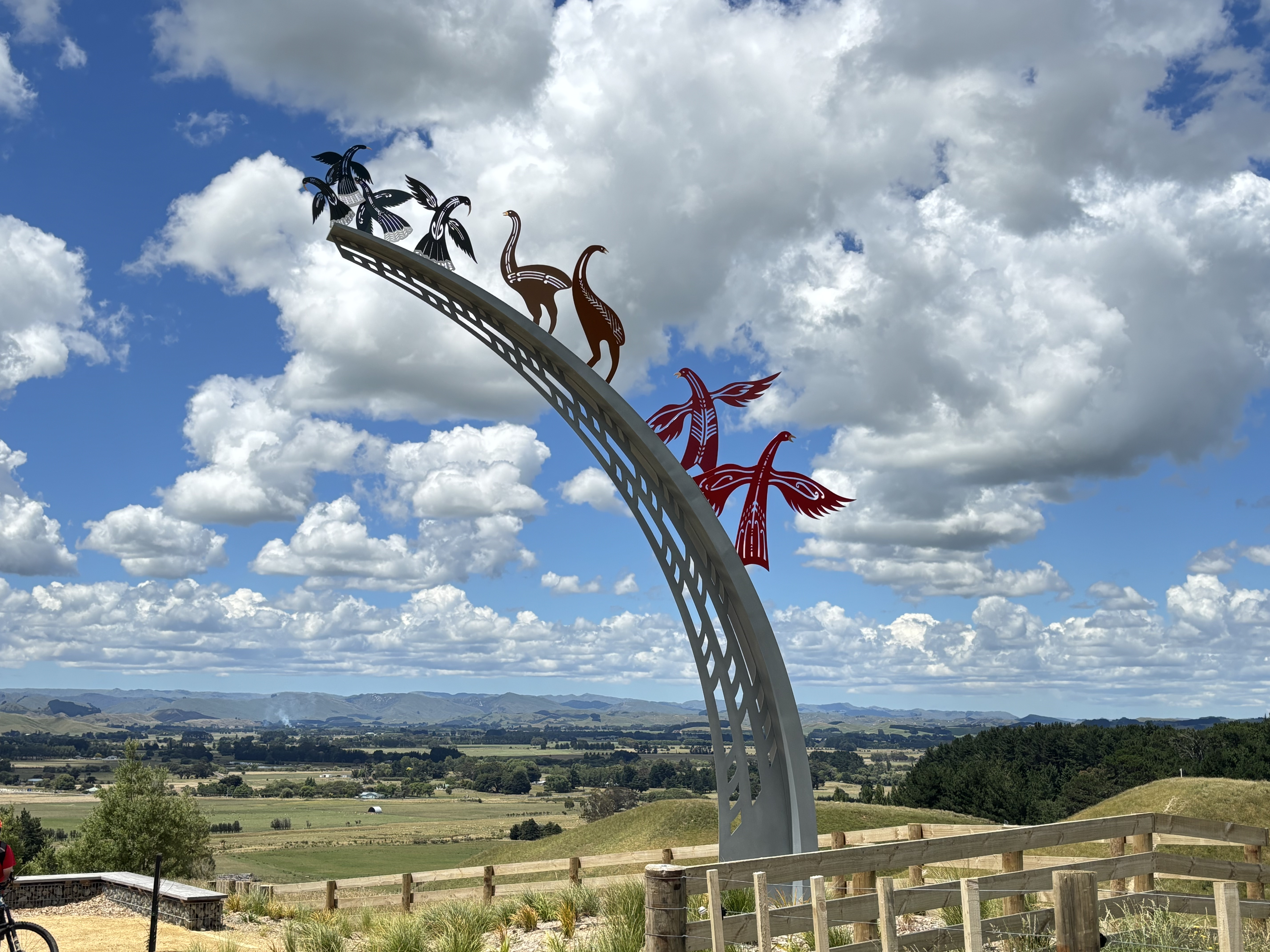

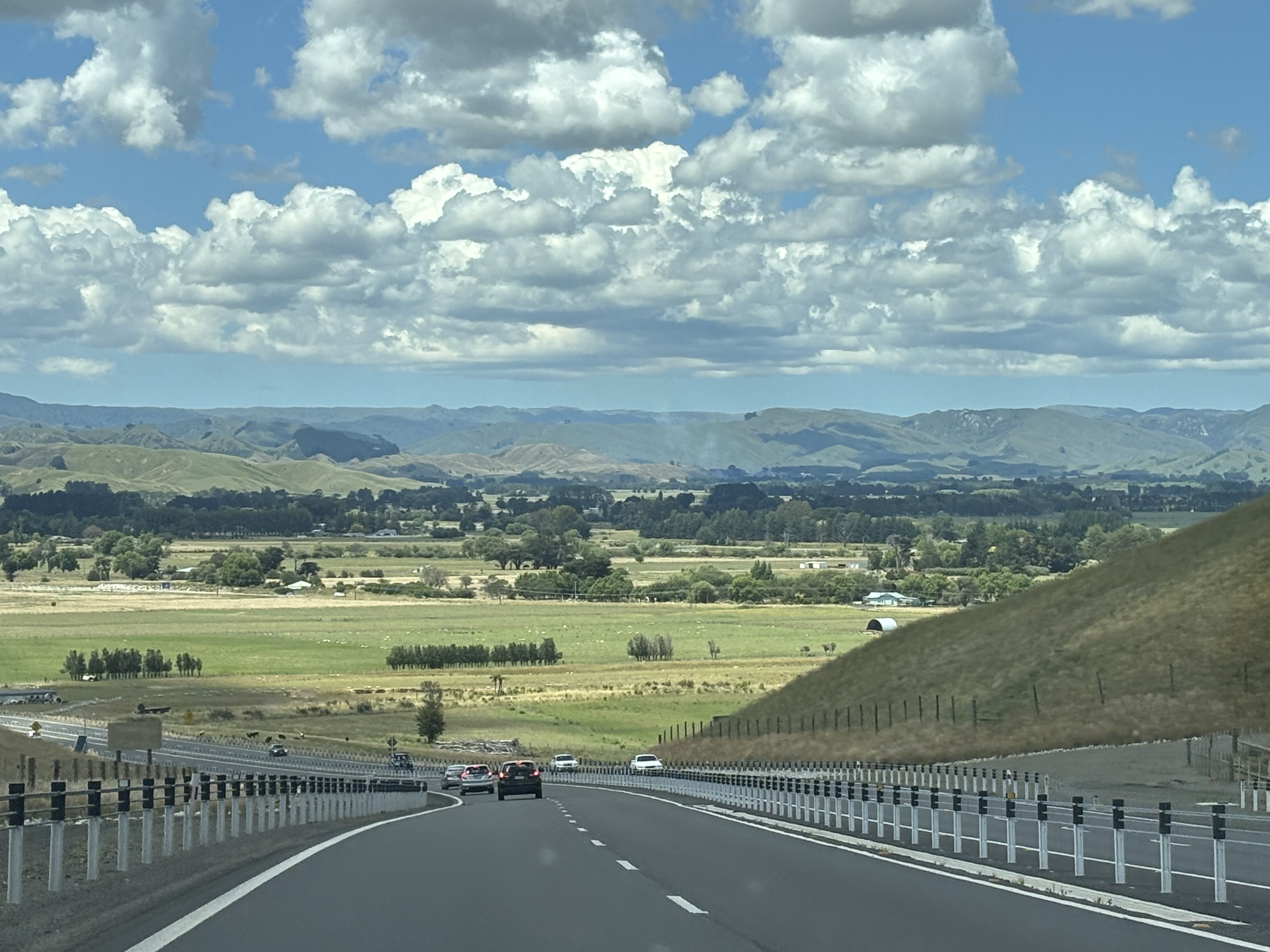

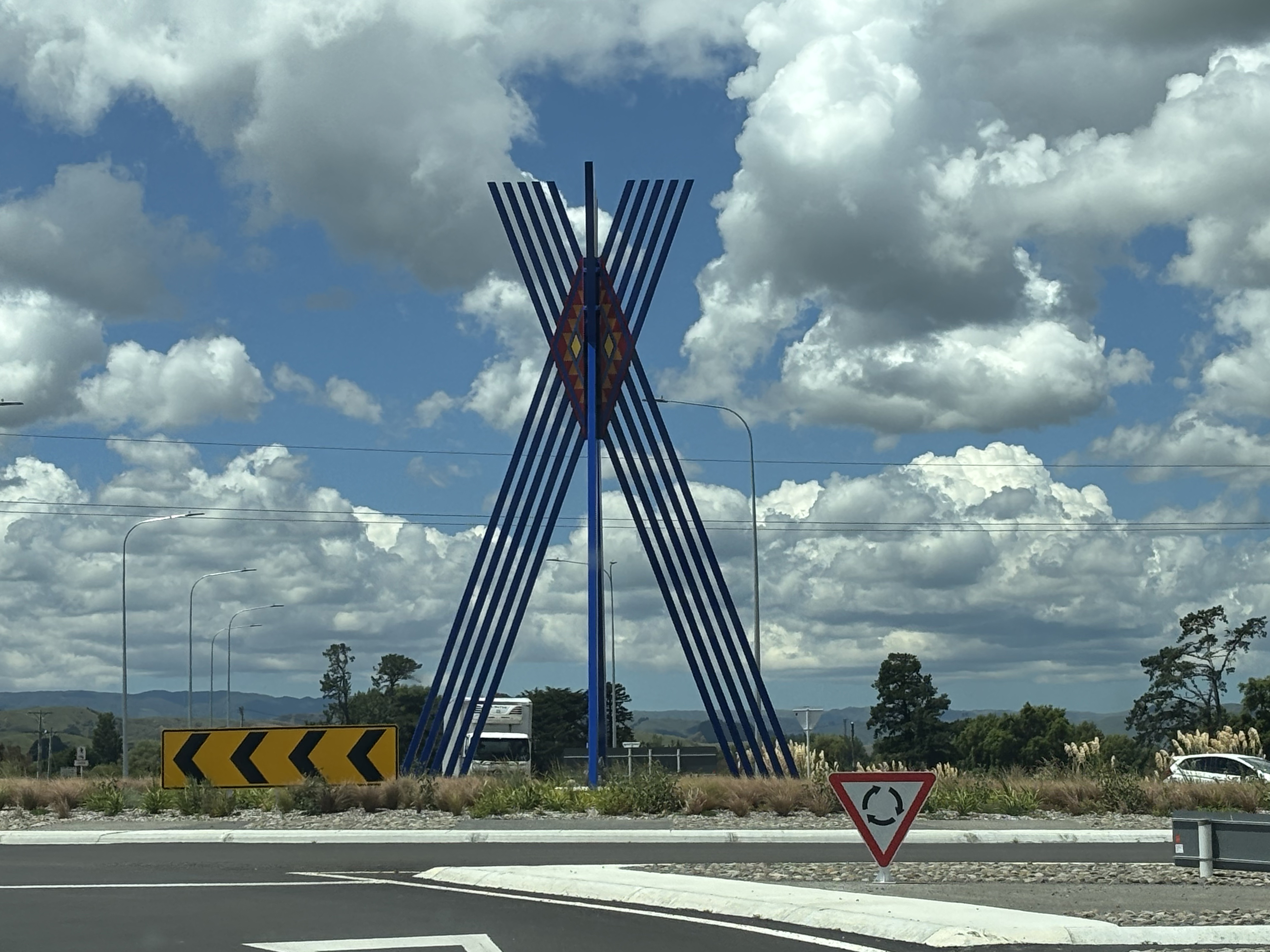

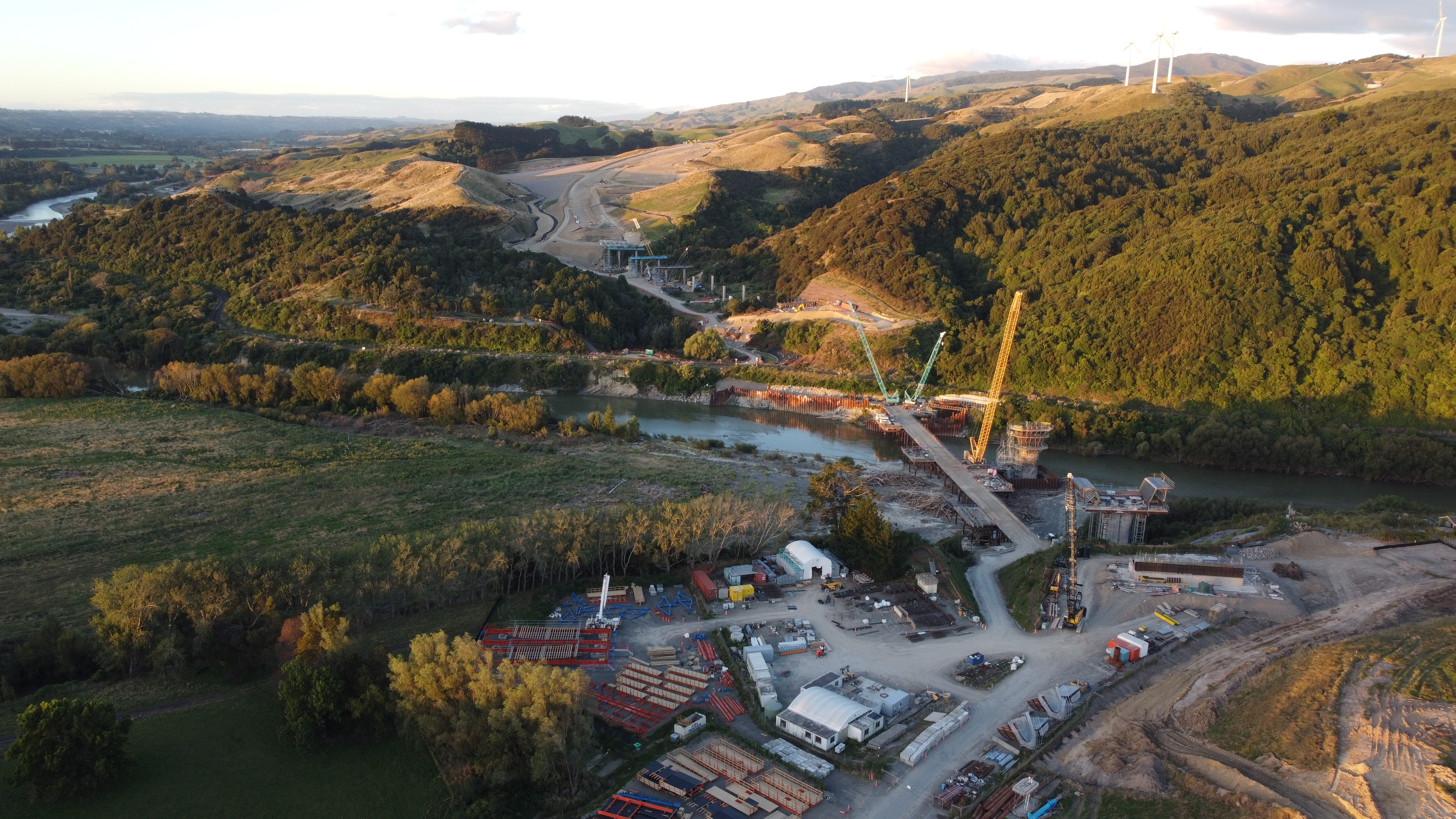
