= Te Peeti Te Aweawe =

Rangitane leader (c. 1820 – 1884)

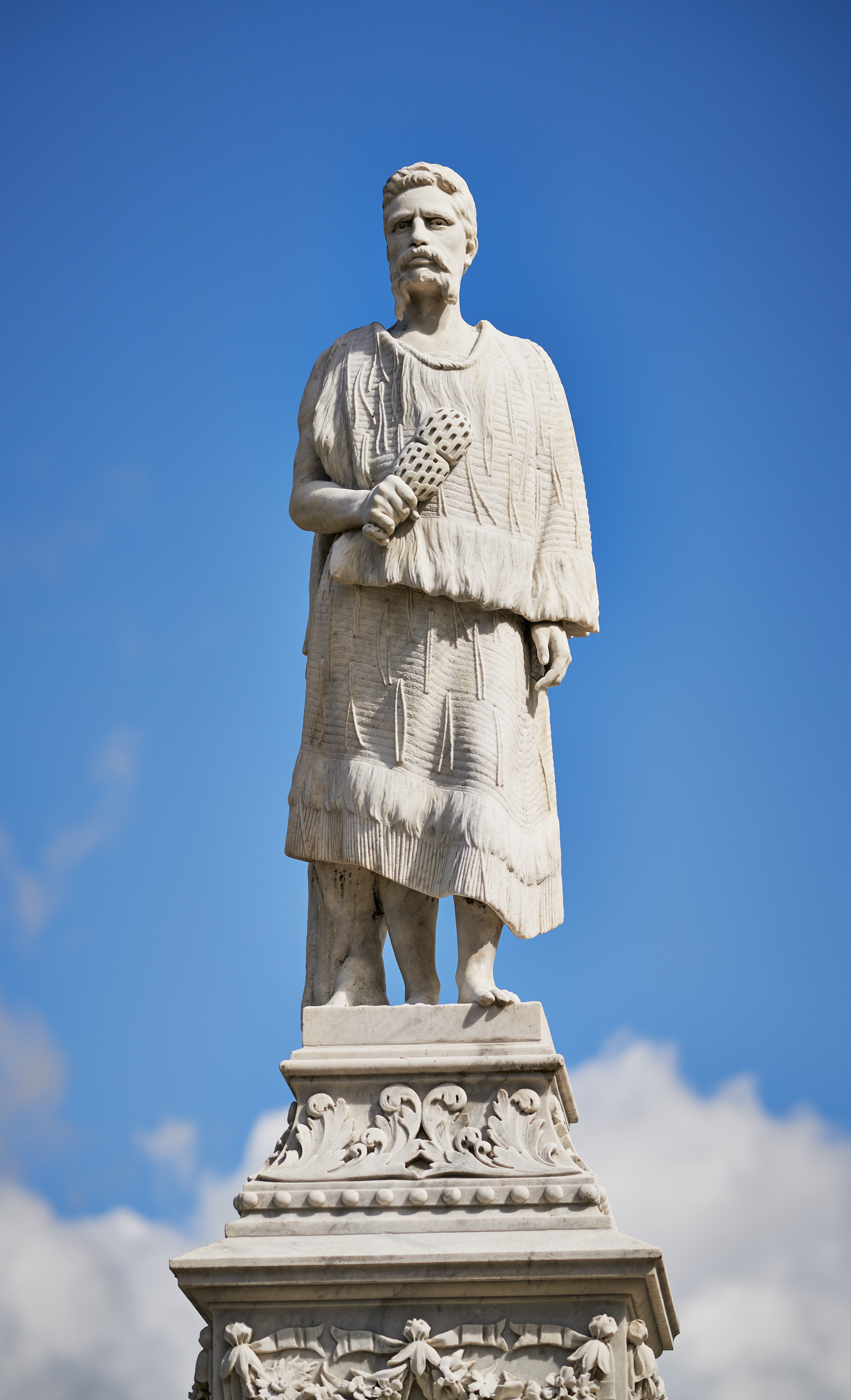
Aweawe memorial in Palmerston North

Te Peeti Te Aweawe (c. 1820 – 30 June 1884) was a New Zealand tribal leader. Of Māori descent, he identified with the Rangitāne iwi. He was instrumental in the sale of Palmerston North district to the government in 1865. His memorial in The Square in Palmerston North is registered by the New Zealand Historic Places Trust as a Category II structure, with registration number 1272.
