= Public transport in the Manawatū-Whanganui Region =

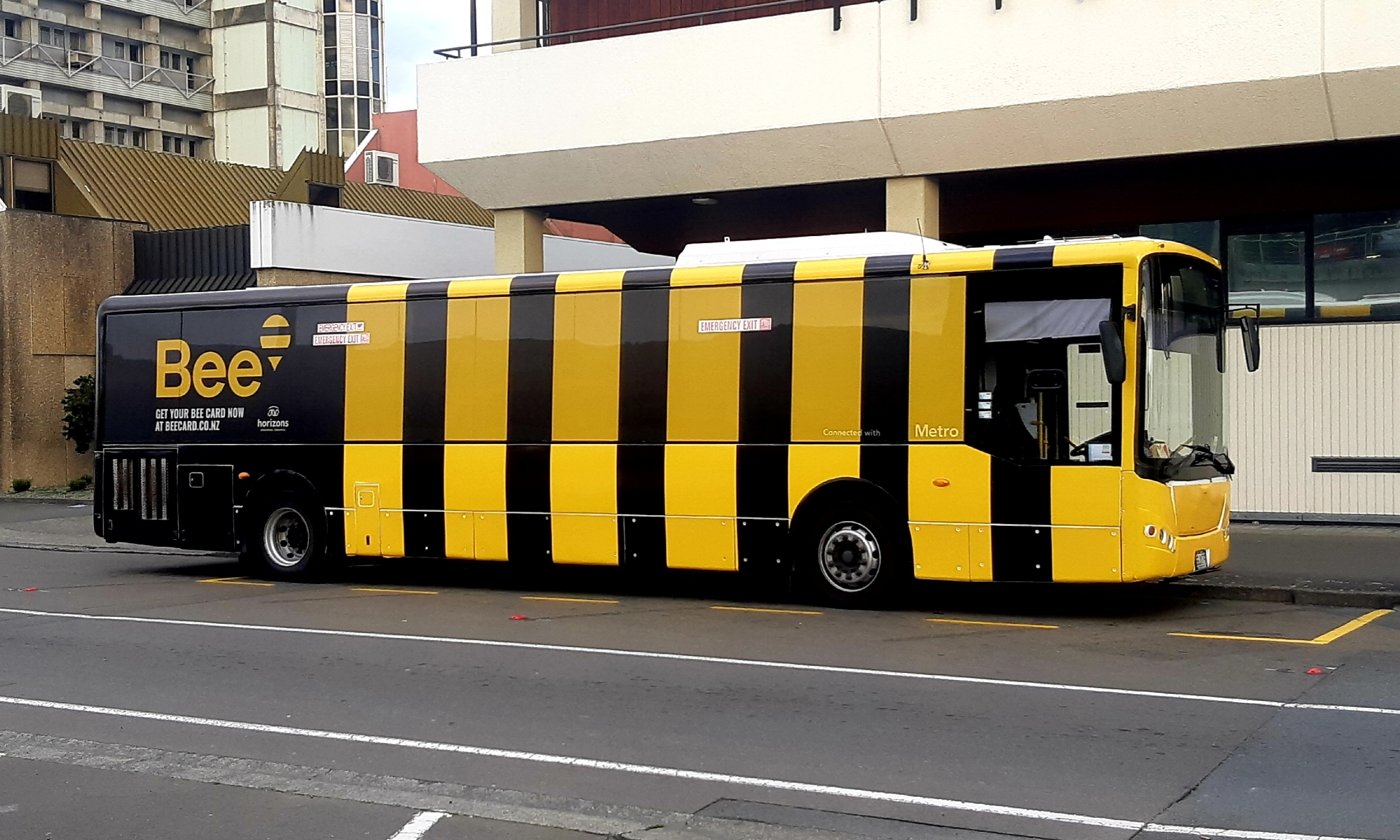
- A Palmerston North urban-services bus, with a livery promoting the usage of the Bee Card ticketing system

Overview
- Locale: Manawatū-Whanganui
- Transit type: commuter rail, bus, elevator
- Annual ridership: Bus: 1,085,821 (2023/24)(+30.32%); 831,826 (2022/23)
- Website: www.horizons.govt.nz/buses-transport

Public transport in the Manawatū-Whanganui region consists mainly of bus services operated under contract to Horizons Regional Council, together with the Capital Connection commuter train linking Palmerston North and Levin with Wellington.

Services are centred on the two largest urban areas, Palmerston North and Whanganui, and extend to towns such as Feilding, Marton, and Levin, as well as smaller rural communities.

== Overview ==
Public transport in the region is primarily provided by bus services that are managed by the regional council (which operates under the name Horizons Regional Council).

Passenger rail is limited, but the region is served by some services. The Capital Connection links the city of Palmerston North, as well as the towns of Shannon and Levin, to the Wellington Region. The train runs daily as a single morning commuter service into Wellington, before operating a return service in the afternoon. Additionally, the Northern Explorer stops in Palmerston North and Taumarunui six-times-a-week (three in each direction) while travelling between Auckland and Wellington. Taumarunui had previously been removed as a regular scheduled stop in 2012, but was reintroduced in 2022 after extensive lobbying from locals.

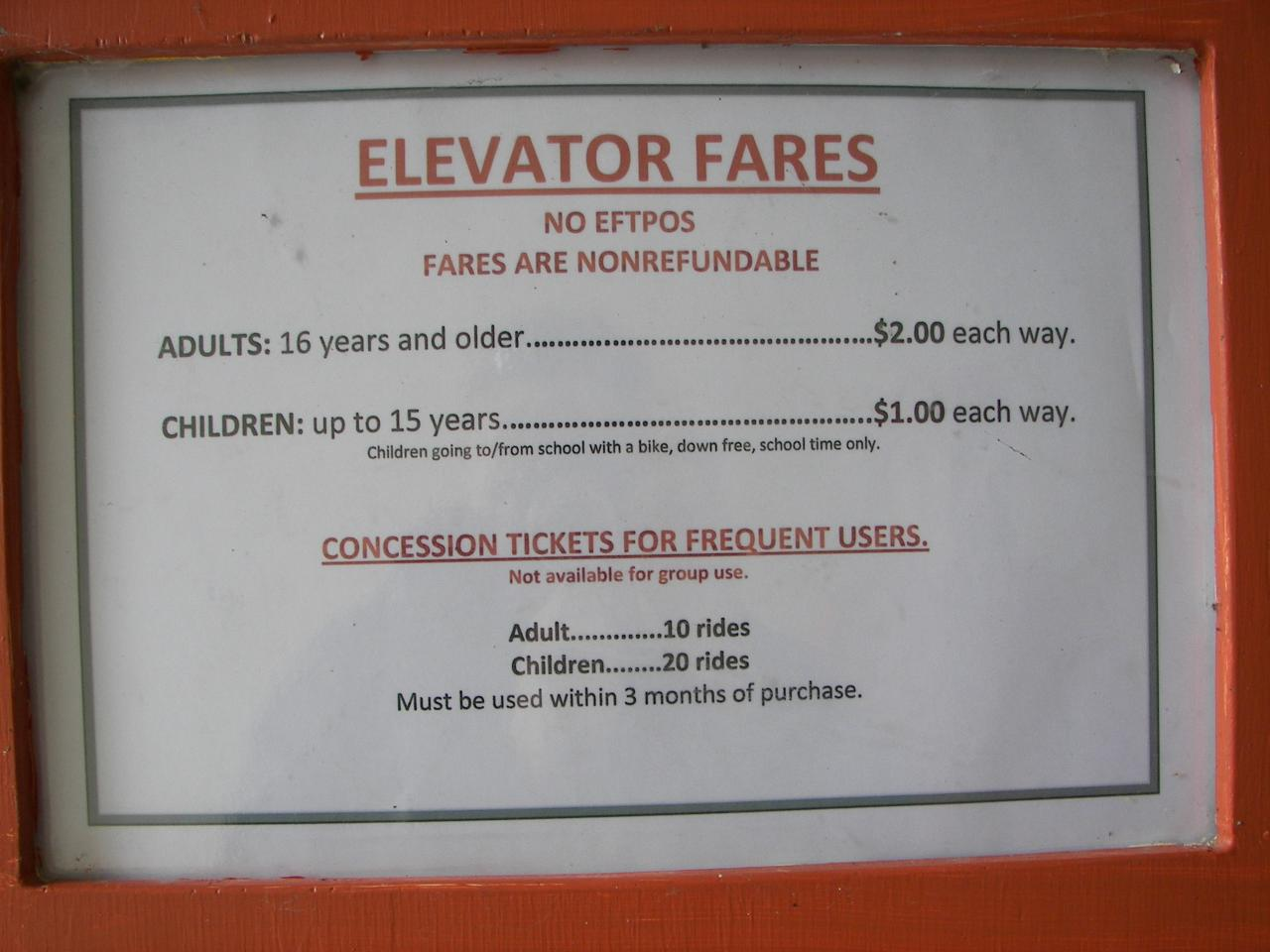
The Durie Hill Elevator in Whanganui operates as a public transport service in its own right

The region is unique in New Zealand for having an elevator as a public transport mode. The Durie Hill Elevator, in the city of Whanganui, provides access between the city centre and the suburb of Durie Hill and has been operating since 1919.

== Buses ==
As the region consists of two cities as well as numerous towns and rural areas, bus services operate as part of three distinct networks that interconnect. An urban network serves Palmerston North (as well as Fielding) while another separate urban network serves Whanganui. A network of regional bus services connect the two cities to each other as well as the wider region.

=== Palmerston North ===
For the history of municipal services between 1921 and 1991, see Palmerston North City Buses.

The Palmerston North bus network were refreshed in March 2024, coinciding with the city introducing New Zealand's first all-electric bus fleet.

Palmerston North has eight cross-city bus routes that connect the city's suburbs, passing through the Main Street Bus Hub (MSBH) adjacent to The Square. All but one of these services operates every 30 minutes from approximately 6:30am to 9:00pm daily, increasing to every 15 minutes during weekday peak. An additional service connects Ashhurst with the city several times daily. Three routes provide direct weekday-only services between suburban areas and Massey University.

Ridership in August 2024 was at 99,156, an increase of over 20,000 compared to August 2023, and an increase of over 41,000 compared to August 2022.

Palmerston North Bus Lines Table
Route	Start	Via	End	Notes
101	Massey University	Fitzherbert Avenue, Main Street Bus Hub (MSBH), Ruahine Street (PN Hospital)	Palmerston North Airport	One service per weekday travels via Atawhai Drive (101X)
102	Awapuni (Maxwells Line)	College Street, MSBH, Tremaine Avenue	Kelvin Grove (Roberts Line)	
103	Cloverlea (Benmore Avenue)	Botanical Road, MSBH, Ruahine Street	Hokowhitu (Albert Street)	
104	Highbury (Clarke Avenue)	Featherston Street, MSBH, Main Street, Parnell Heights Drive	Kelvin Grove (Cemetery)	
105	Summerhill (Atlantic Drive)	IPU, Fitzherbert Avenue, MSBH, Rangitikei Street	Milson (Apollo Park)	
106	Awapuni (Maxwells Line)	Pioneer Highway, MSBH, Featherston Street, Mihaere Drive	Kelvin Grove (James Line)	One service per weekday extends to Whakarongo School (106X)
107	Westbrook (Havelock Avenue)	Tremaine Avenue, MSBH, College Street	Terrace End (Brightwater Terrace)	
108	Awapuni (Rugby Street)	Ferguson Street, MSBH, Rangiora Avenue	Roslyn (Clyde Crescent)	Weekday interpeak only
114	Ashhurst	State Highway 3	Main Street Bus Hub	
121	Papaioea (Ward Street)	Albert Street, Te Awe Awe Street	Massey University	Weekdays only
122	Takaro (Wood Street)	Botanical Road, College Street	Massey University	Weekdays only
123	Summerhill (Atlantic Drive)	IPU	Massey University	Weekdays only

=== Whanganui ===
The Whanganui urban bus network consists of ten routes which converge on the city centre where multiple routes run parallel along a common corridor. For the last few decades, the city has had a bus network focused on coverage with a large number of low-frequency bus routes aimed at providing service coverage to most areas. As a result, most routes are infrequent and only operate every two hours. However, in 2023, the city saw the introduction of a high-frequency bus route focused on patronage and moving large passenger numbers. The route, named Te Ngaru The Tide, runs on 20-minute frequencies between Castlecliff and Aramoho via the city centre bus corridor. In its first month of operation, the city saw an 86 percent increase in urban public transport trips when compared to the same month in the previous year.

Whanganui Bus Lines Table
Route	Start	End	Via	Frequency (approx)
201	Castlecliff	Trafalgar Square (City Centre)	Fitzherbert Avenue	Every 2 hours Monday – Friday Three Saturday services
202	Castlecliff	Trafalgar Square (City Centre)	Whanganui Hospital	Every 2 hours Monday – Friday Three Saturday services
203	Springvale	Trafalgar Square (City Centre)	Virginia Road	Twice daily Additional interpeak service in the Springvale direction
204	Springvale	Trafalgar Square (City Centre)	Parsons Street	Twice daily Additional interpeak service in the Trafalgar Square direction
205	Aramoho	Trafalgar Square (City Centre)	Harrison Street	Every 2 hours Monday – Friday
206	Aramoho	Trafalgar Square (City Centre)	London Street	Every 2 hours Monday – Friday
207	Whanganui East	Trafalgar Square (City Centre)	Ikitara Road	
208	Whanganui East	Trafalgar Square (City Centre)	Jones Street	
209	Trafalgar Square (City Centre)	Trafalgar Square (City Centre)	Springvale, Aramoho	Saturday only
210 – The Tide	Castlecliff	Aramoho	Whanganui Hospital, Trafalgar Square (City Centre),	Every 20 minutes Monday – Friday Hourly after 7 pm Every 20 minutes 9 am – 3pm Saturday

=== Regional ===
Some of the region's smaller towns and villages are inter-connected with 6 bus lines. Feilding is also served by its own "Orbiter" service.

Regional Bus Lines Table
Route	Start	End	Via	Frequency	Notes
225	Whanganui	Palmerston North	Bulls, Sanson	Daily return (Monday – Friday)	
301	Feilding (Manchester Square)	Feilding (Manchester Square)		Monday to Saturday	Feilding Orbiter
311	Feilding (Manchester Square)	Palmerston North (Main Street Bus Hub)	Bunnythorpe, PN Airport, PN Hospital	Monday to Saturday	One service per day bypasses the Airport and extends to Palmerston North Girls' High School (311G)
N/A	Levin	Waikanae	Manakau, Otaki	Return service on Tuesdays and Thursdays	Inter-regional service cross-boundary into the Wellington Region. Jointly funded by the Greater Wellington Regional Council.
401	Levin	Palmerston North	Foxton, Himatangi	Daily peak return service (Monday – Friday)	
402	Levin	Palmerston North	Foxton, Himatangi	Off peak return service on Mondays	
402	Levin	Palmerston North	Shannon, Tokomaru, Linton	Off peak return service on Wednesdays	
N/A	Taihape	Palmerston North	Ohingaiti, Hunterville, Marton, Bulls	Return service on the first Thursday of every month	
N/A	Taihape	Whanganui	Ohingaiti, Hunterville, Marton, Turakina	Return service on the third Thursday of every month	
A Day Out in Town (Horowhenua District bus service)	Levin	Levin	Shannon, Foxton Beach, Foxton, Waitarere Beach	One morning and one afternoon service on Fridays	

== Railway ==
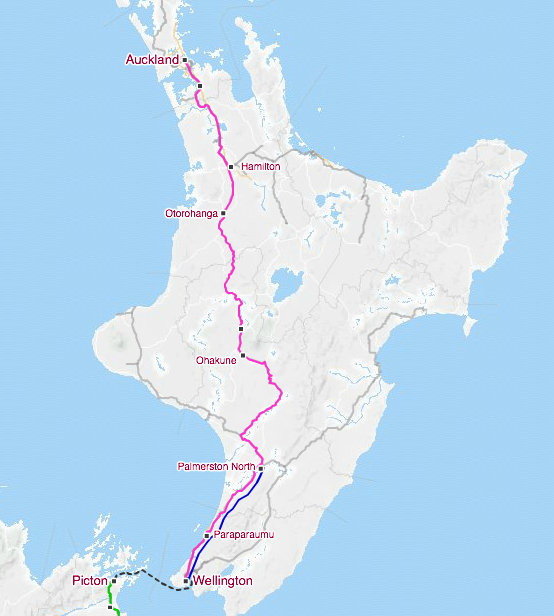
KiwiRail passenger trains in the North Island

The surveying of many of the region’s settlements -and particularly those away from the coast- coincided with the development of the North Island Main Trunk line during the late 19th century. This resulted in many settlements being served by passenger rail.

Declines in passenger railway investments during the 20th century now means that only Palmerston North, Levin and Shannon are served by regular passenger train services. The Capital Connection connects these stations to the Kapiti Coast and Wellington, while the Northern Explorer also serves Palmerston North.

It is proposed that the Capital Connection’s services be expanded to run multiple times per day.

== Other Modes ==
A tram system was proposed for Palmerston North in 1912 but was not implemented due to the First World War. Buses were ultimately chosen over trams and started services in 1921.

A rapid transit monorail system was proposed for Palmerston North in 1972. The service would have had three stops: Massey University at one end, the Square at the other end, and the Lido Aquatic Centre in the middle. The project was not implemented.
