= Cornerstone Christian School, Palmerston North =

State-integrated school in New Zealand

Cornerstone Christian School

Location
- 119 Mihaere Drive, Kelvin Grove, Palmerston North, New Zealand, 4414; 40.3311°S 175.6503°E

Information
- Type: State-Integrated
- Motto: Learn Serve and Grow in God
- Established: 1987
- Ministry of Education Institution no.: 1172
- Principal: James Rose
- Years: 1–13
- Gender: Coeducational
- Enrolment: 603 (July 2026)
- Socio-economic decile: 7
- Website: cornerstone.ac.nz

Cornerstone Christian School is an integrated co-educational Area School (combined Primary and Secondary) for Years 1–13 in the city of Palmerston North, New Zealand. The school is divided by an administrative block between the junior and senior areas, after the senior area the newly installed intermediate block is situated.

== Location ==
The school is located on the intersection of Mihaere Drive, and Roberts line in the suburb of Kelvin Grove, Palmerston North.

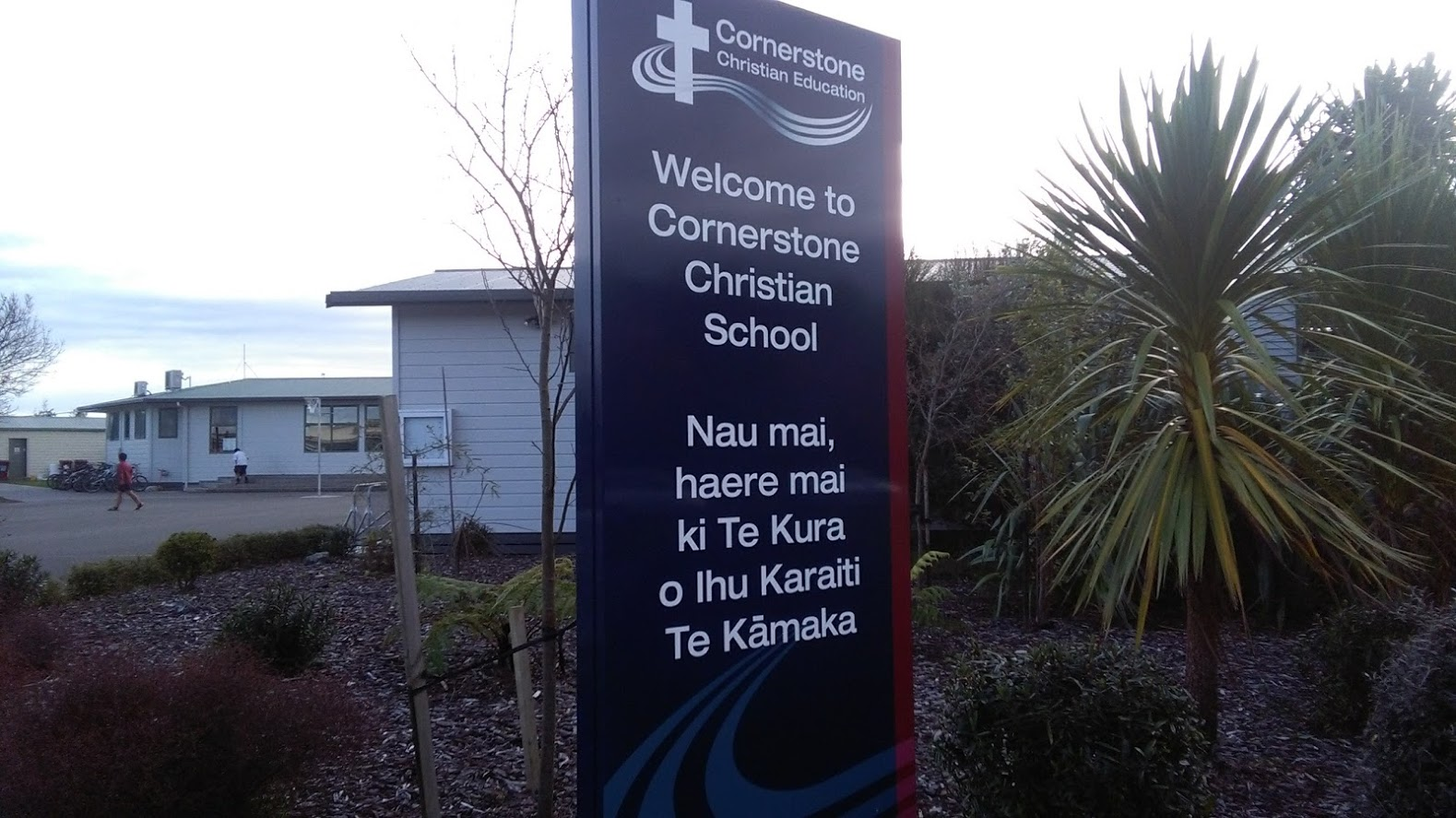
Entrance to school grounds from Mihaere Drive

== History ==
In 1987, the school began as a private Year 1–8 primary school, (for 5 to 13 year olds).

In 1994, the school became a state-integrated school overseen by a charitable trust.

Between 1997 and 2007, the school purchased land, built classrooms, and gradually moved to its current location on Mihaere Drive.

In 2013, the school was given approval by the Ministry of Education to expand from its existing state as a Year 1–8 primary school, to being a full Year 1–13 composite school (for 5 to 18 year olds). This would progress in stages, with an additional year group added between 2014 and 2018. The first secondary class began in 2014.

In 2016, the school along with several other schools in the Manawatū-Whanganui region was closed for a day after a confirmed case of the measles.

In 2017, the school became a founding member of the Lower North Island Christian Schools Community of Learning (COL), with principal Peter Ferrar appointed the COL's leadership role.

In 2019, the school gained an additional building from Westmount school for the intermediate aged students.

=== Principals ===
Period	Principal
1996–2003	Lois Price
2004–2012	Nigel Tongs
2013–2019	Dr Peter Ferrar
2020–2025	Chris Mitchell
2026-	James Rose

== Enrolment ==
As a state-integrated school, Cornerstone Christian School charges compulsory attendance dues. For the 2025 school year, the attendance dues payable is $975 per year for students in years 1 to 8 and $1,225 per year for students in years 9 to 13.

As of July 2026, Cornerstone Christian School has a roll of 603 students, of which 69 (11.4%) identify as Māori.

As of 2026, the school has an Equity Index of 417, placing it amongst schools whose students have few socioeconomic barriers to achievement (roughly equivalent to deciles 8 and 9 under the former socio-economic decile system).

== Facilities ==
For primary classes, the school has three blocks of four to five classrooms each on the northern end of its property. Secondary classes primarily take place in the double-story blocks towards the southern end of the property.

In 2011, the school paid additional council fees to build a 493 square metres (5,310 sq ft) architecturally designed administration and multipurpose staff-room block.

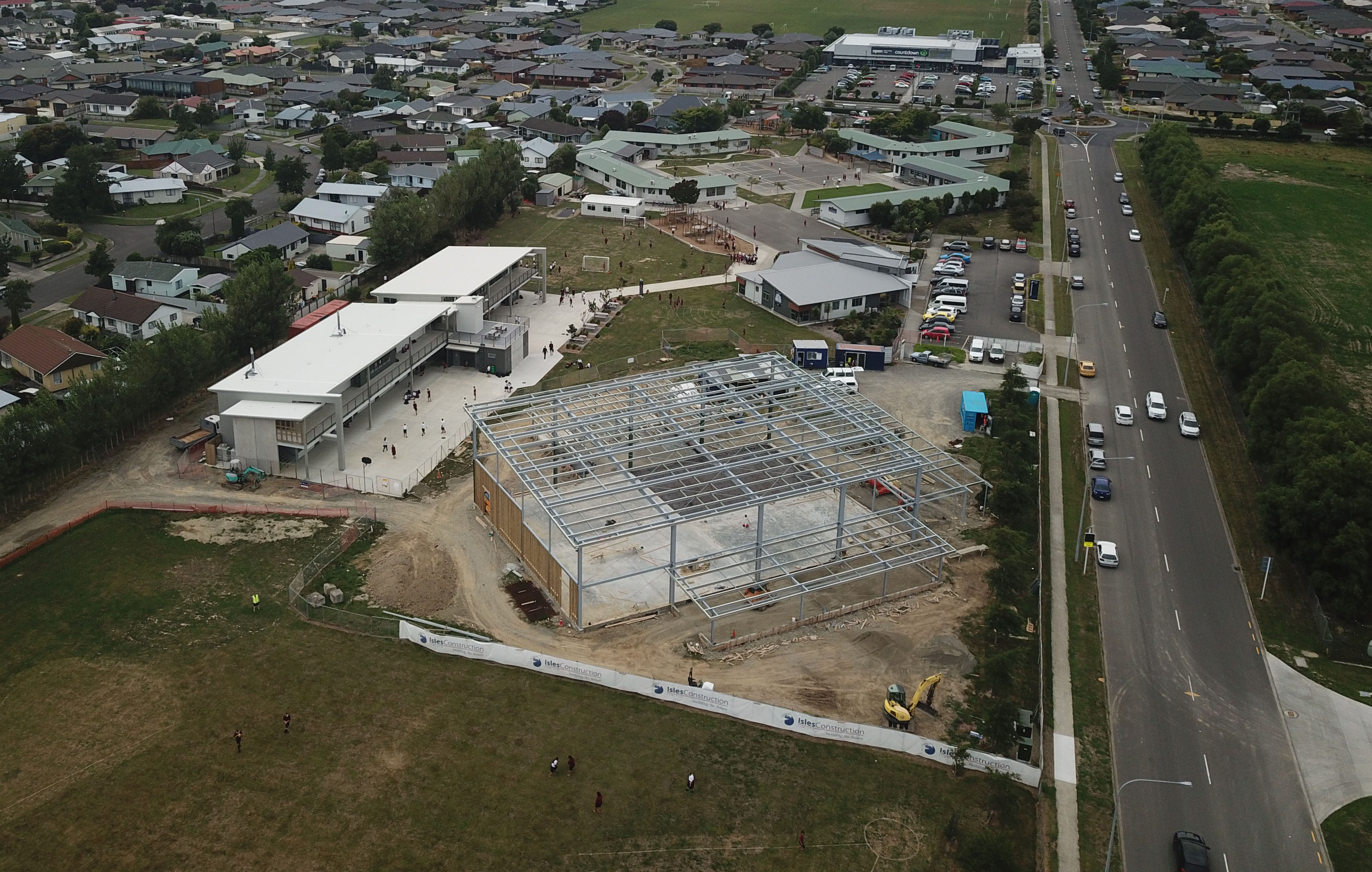
Construction of the Gymnasium – March 2018; photo taken by drone at 60 m elevation

Specialised art and music classrooms were included in the double story 'G-Block' in 2015, and used for activities such as art expos.

Work began in late 2017, on a multi-million dollar basketball court sized gymnasium, including weights room, and offices. There were unsuccessful applications for council funding towards this facility, for it to be used as community centre. It was opened in September 2018 by Palmerston North Mayor Grant Smith. The gymnasium is regularly used for the school's annual gala, the annual sports exchange with Hastings Christian School and Longburn Adventist College, national volleyball tournament games, and Manawatu Jets basketball games.
