= Kelvin Grove, Palmerston North =

Suburb of Palmerston North

Kelvin Grove
- Suburb
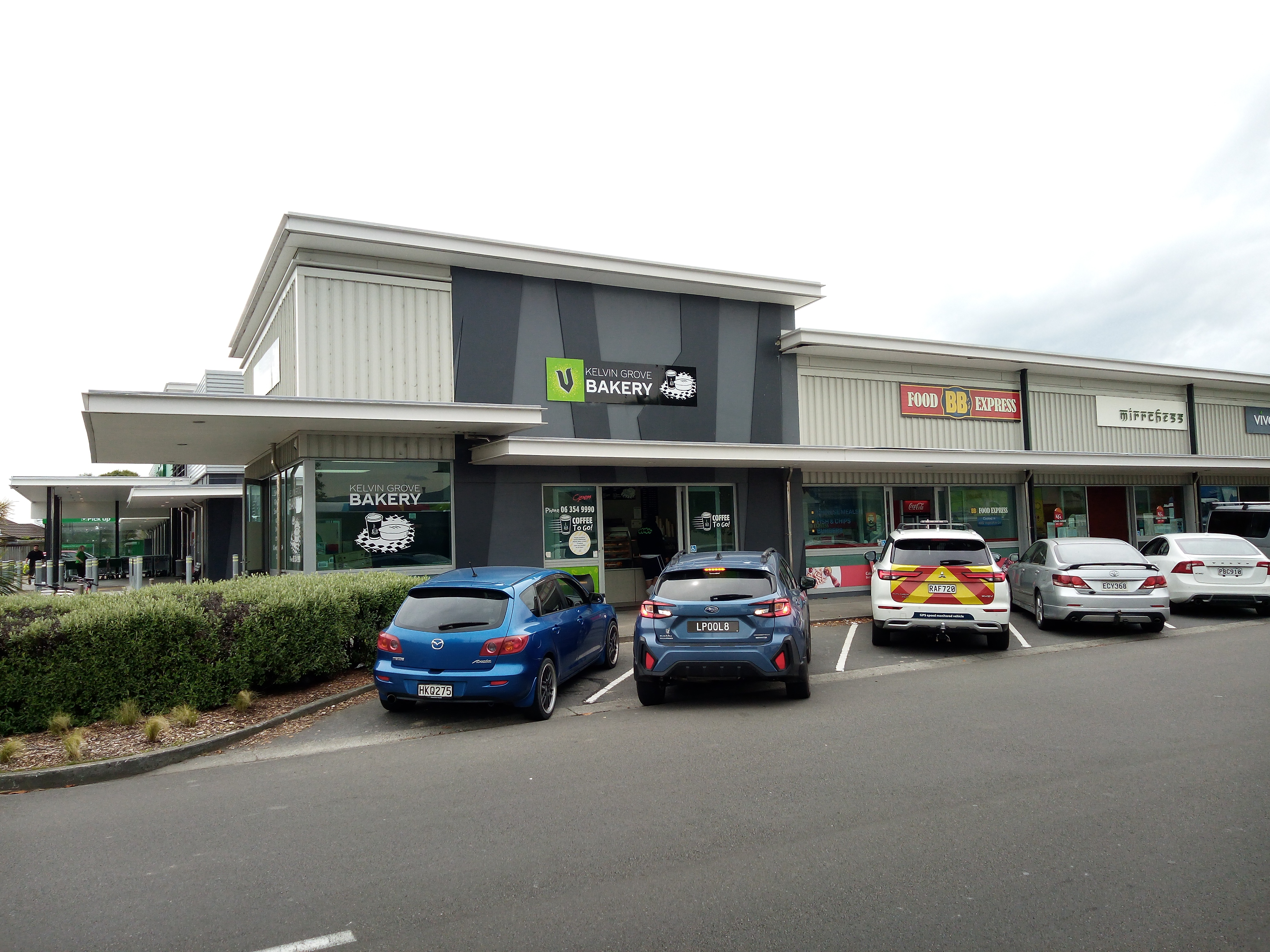
- Kelvin Grove shops
- Interactive map of Kelvin Grove
- Coordinates: 40°19′48″S 175°38′13″E
- Country: New Zealand
- City: Palmerston North
- Local authority: Palmerston North City Council
- Electoral ward: Te Hirawanui General Ward; Te Pūao Māori Ward

Area
  - Land: 470 ha (1,200 acres)

Population (June 2025)
  - Total: 8,170
  - Density: 1,700/km^{2} (4,500/sq mi)

Milson	Kelvin Grove	Whakarongo
Terrace End	Aokautere

Kelvin Grove is a suburb of Palmerston North on New Zealand's North Island. It is bounded on the north by the North Island Main Trunk railway, Manawatū District and Milson, on the west by Palmerston North–Gisborne Line and Roslyn, the south by the Manawatū River, and the east by James Line and Whakarongo.

It was identified as one of New Zealand's fastest growth suburbs in November 2016.

The lower North Island distribution centres of Foodstuffs, Coca-Cola Amatil and Woolworths are located in Kelvin Grove. The national customer centre of Toyota New Zealand and the Radius Peppertree rest home and hospital is also located on Roberts Line.

Many Kelvin Grove street name are named after New Zealand places, such as Kaimanawa, Anakiwa, Karamea, Mahia and Wairau. Local parks include Kaimanawa Park, Celaeno Park, Kelvin Grove Park, Linklater Block, Schnell Reserve, Schnell Esplanade Reserve, Robêrt Reserve, Frederick Krull Reserve, Dahlstrom Reserve, James Line Reserve and Parnell Reserve.

== History ==
=== Pre-European history ===
The original inhabitants of the area were the local Rangitāne iwi, and was part of the Te-Ahu-a-Turanga block that was sold by Rangitāne in 1865.

=== European settlement ===
The first Europeans arrived in Kelvin Grove in 1871 when Scandinavian immigrants settled in the area around present day Roberts Line-James Line and Napier Road block. This area and also that of Whakarongo, became known as the Stoney Creek Scandinavian Block. At this time the area was mainly thick forest, which had to be felled in order for settlement. This was achieved by the mid-1870s.

In 1893, Kelvin Grove School was established and Kelvin Grove as an entity of its own was established. Kelvin Grove was the name of the local sawmill (which had opened in 1879). In 1901, Kelvin Grove Hall was built. In 1921, however, the hall burnt down and was not replaced until 1935.

In 1939, Kelvin Grove School closed down, due to parents choosing other schools such as Milson or Terrace End.

=== Urban development ===
In 1950, part of Kelvin Grove was brought under the jurisdiction of Palmerston North City, but it was not until 1966 when houses began to appear especially in the Karamea Crescent and Mahia Place area. The mostly rural suburb has gradually expanded since then.

Prior to 1996, Kelvin Grove was part of the Manawatu electorate. This electorate included parts of Palmerston North, east of Ruahine Street as well as Linton Camp, Turitea, Aokautere and Roslyn. However, due to the reformation of the electoral system from FPP to MMP, the electorate of Rangitikei's boundaries were redrawn to include Kelvin Grove. A 2007 boundary redistribution includes Kelvin Grove in the Palmerston North electorate.

Several new homes were built in Kelvin Grove during the 2010s. A housing development in Kelvin Grove was one of the first to restart, following the coronavirus lockdown in 2020.

== Demographics ==
Kelvin Grove covers 4.70 km^{2} (1.81 sq mi) and had an estimated population of 8,170 as of June 2025, with a population density of 1,738 people per km^{2}.

Historical population
Year	Pop.	±% p.a.
2006	4,800	—
2013	6,783	+5.06%
2018	7,218	+1.25%
2023	7,776	+1.50%
The 2006 population is for a smaller area of 4.55 km^{2}. Source:

Kelvin Grove had a population of 7,776 in the 2023 New Zealand census, an increase of 558 people (7.7%) since the 2018 census, and an increase of 993 people (14.6%) since the 2013 census. There were 3,789 males, 3,960 females, and 24 people of other genders in 2,628 dwellings. 2.8% of people identified as LGBTIQ+. The median age was 36.8 years (compared with 38.1 years nationally). There were 1,740 people (22.4%) aged under 15 years, 1,356 (17.4%) aged 15 to 29, 3,459 (44.5%) aged 30 to 64, and 1,218 (15.7%) aged 65 or older.

People could identify as more than one ethnicity. The results were 72.2% European (Pākehā); 15.2% Māori; 5.1% Pasifika; 19.1% Asian; 2.1% Middle Eastern, Latin American and African New Zealanders (MELAA); and 2.5% other, which includes people giving their ethnicity as "New Zealander". English was spoken by 95.0%, Māori by 3.7%, Samoan by 0.9%, and other languages by 17.2%. No language could be spoken by 2.4% (e.g. too young to talk). New Zealand Sign Language was known by 0.8%. The percentage of people born overseas was 24.3, compared with 28.8% nationally.

Religious affiliations were 38.6% Christian, 2.5% Hindu, 1.3% Islam, 0.7% Māori religious beliefs, 1.7% Buddhist, 0.2% New Age, and 2.1% other religions. People who answered that they had no religion were 46.8%, and 6.2% of people did not answer the census question.

Of those at least 15 years old, 1,476 (24.5%) people had a bachelor's or higher degree, 3,147 (52.1%) had a post-high school certificate or diploma, and 1,413 (23.4%) people exclusively held high school qualifications. The median income was $45,900, compared with $41,500 nationally. 621 people (10.3%) earned over $100,000 compared to 12.1% nationally. The employment status of those at least 15 was 3,297 (54.6%) full-time, 780 (12.9%) part-time, and 105 (1.7%) unemployed.

Individual statistical areas
Name	Area (km^{2})	Population	Density (per km^{2})	Dwellings	Median age	Median income
Kelvin Grove West	0.78	2,637	3,381	885	32.2 years	$42,800
Kelvin Grove North	3.14	2,337	1,092	771	37.8 years	$50,600
Royal Oak)	2.77	2,802	1,583	975	40.9 years	$46,000
New Zealand					38.1 years	$41,500

== Cemetery ==
Kelvin Grove Cemetery is Palmerston North's main cemetery, performing about 180 burials and 400 cremations each year. It was opened in 1927 to replace the old Terrace End Cemetery on Napier Road, the crematorium and chapel were added in 1954, and a modern gas-fired cremator was installed in 2003.

The cemetery allows flower garden tributes, unlike other cemeteries in the region.

In 2018, a group of four roosters and three chickens were trapped at the cemetery and sent to slaughter, several years after they had been dumped there.

The Palmerston North branch of the Returned Services' Association and soldiers from the Linton Military Camp reached an agreement with Palmerston North City Council in 2019 to clean the headstones of 1000 veterans buried at the cemetery. The association had to also seek permission from the veterans' families.

Bronze plaques, bronze flower holders and a sundial were stolen from the cemetery in February 2020.

== Education ==
Te Kura Kaupapa Māori o Manawatu is a co-educational Māori language immersion state primary school, with a roll of 117 as of July 2026. It opened in 1990.

Cornerstone Christian School is a co-educational state-integrated Christian school for Year 1 to 13 students, with a roll of 603. It was established as a private school in 1987 and became state-integrated in 1994. It moved to its current site in 2007.

There is also a kindergarten in the suburb.

== Transport ==
Palmerston North bus routes 102, 104 and 106 serve Kelvin Grove.
