= Milson, New Zealand =

Suburb of Palmerston North

Milson
- Suburb
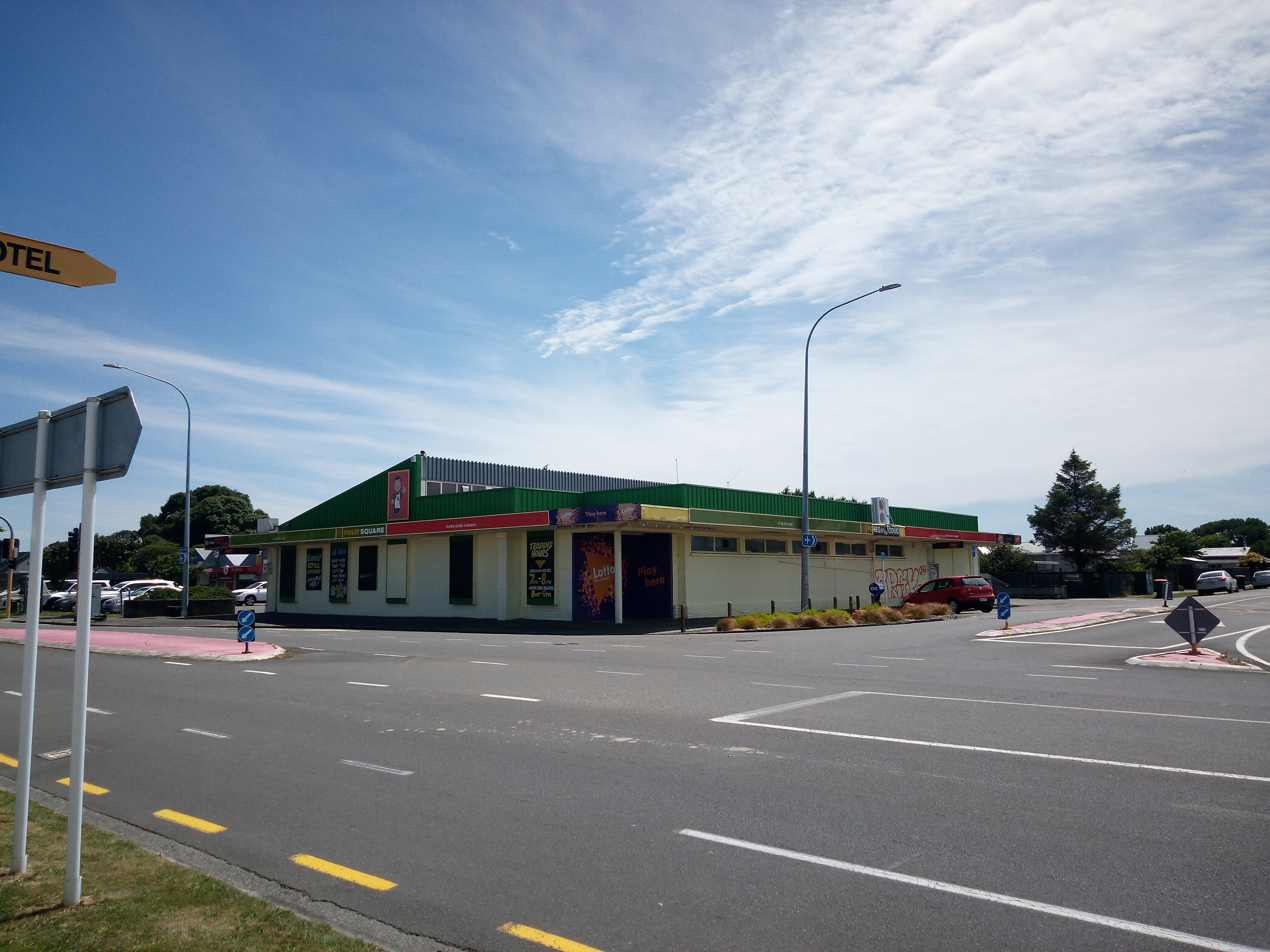
- The Milson Four Square in 2025
- Interactive map of Milson
- Coordinates: 40°20′S 175°37′E
- Country: New Zealand
- City: Palmerston North
- Local authority: Palmerston North City Council
- Electoral ward: Te Hirawanui General Ward; Te Pūao Māori Ward
- Established: 1926

Area
  - Land: 973 ha (2,400 acres)

Population (June 2025)
  - Total: 6,260
  - Density: 643/km^{2} (1,670/sq mi)
- Airports: Palmerston North Airport

	Bunnythorpe	Whakarongo
Newbury	Milson	Kelvin Grove
Cloverlea	Papaioea	Roslyn

Milson is a suburb of Palmerston North, Manawatū-Whanganui, New Zealand. The suburb is located to the north of the city, beyond the North Island Main Trunk Rail.

Milson is mostly a residential suburb with an estimated population of 6,260 as of June 2025. Milson is divided into a residential zone in the west and central and an industrial zone in the east.

Palmerston North Airport is in Milson.

Milson was part of the Papaioea Ward of Palmerston North City Council until 2013. It was part of the Manawatu electorate until 1996, when it became part of the Rangitikei electorate.

Many other local streets and parks have a space or US presidential theme. For example, Apollo Park has a spaced-themed playground and a butterfly park. Other parks include Colquhoun Park, John F Kennedy Park, Clearview Park, Kennedy Park, Paradise Park, Pinedale Reserve, Langley Reserve, Clearview Reserve, Jefferson Reserve and Mangaone Stream Esplanade Reserve.

== History ==
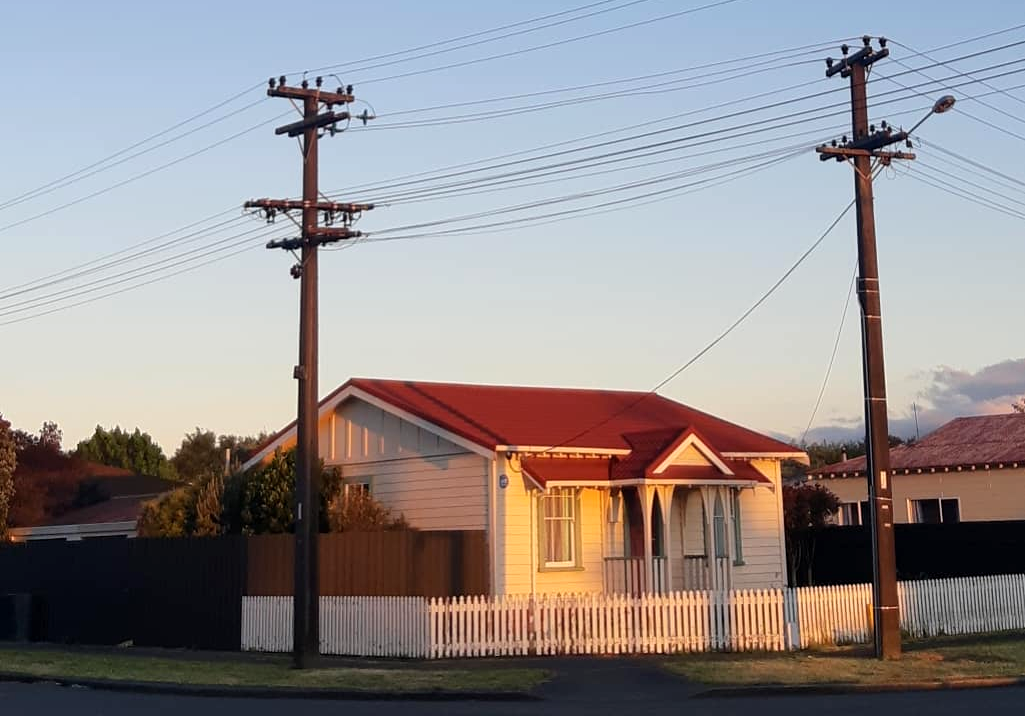
A railway worker cottage in Milson. 70 of these were built by the Railways Department in 1926.

In 1926, work began on the nearby Milson railway deviation which was to take the main trunk line out of the city centre. Earlier in the decade, the Railways Department was granted their own housing programme to combat problems in housing its workers. To service the construction of the Milson deviation, the department erected a railway settlement in the area, calling it Milson. Some 70 railway houses were built. Milson Primary School and a community centre were built to serve the workers and their families. many of these houses were sold following reforms of the railways in the late 20th century. About 60 houses remain today.

Much of the rest of the suburb was constructed after the 1950s.

Milson, and Milson Line (a main street in the suburb), are named after a historic local land owner

== Demographics ==
Milson covers 9.73 km^{2} (3.76 sq mi) and had an estimated population of 6,260 as of June 2025, with a population density of 643 people per km^{2}.

Historical population
Year	Pop.	±% p.a.
2006	5,292	—
2013	5,586	+0.78%
2018	5,775	+0.67%
2023	6,051	+0.94%

Milson had a population of 6,051 in the 2023 New Zealand census, an increase of 276 people (4.8%) since the 2018 census, and an increase of 465 people (8.3%) since the 2013 census. There were 2,946 males, 3,093 females, and 15 people of other genders in 2,223 dwellings. 3.4% of people identified as LGBTIQ+. The median age was 36.6 years (compared with 38.1 years nationally). There were 1,179 people (19.5%) aged under 15 years, 1,218 (20.1%) aged 15 to 29, 2,472 (40.9%) aged 30 to 64, and 1,182 (19.5%) aged 65 or older.

People could identify as more than one ethnicity. The results were 73.2% European (Pākehā); 20.8% Māori; 5.0% Pasifika; 16.5% Asian; 0.9% Middle Eastern, Latin American and African New Zealanders (MELAA); and 2.0% other, which includes people giving their ethnicity as "New Zealander". English was spoken by 96.1%, Māori by 4.7%, Samoan by 0.6%, and other languages by 12.9%. No language could be spoken by 2.2% (e.g. too young to talk). New Zealand Sign Language was known by 0.8%. The percentage of people born overseas was 20.0, compared with 28.8% nationally.

Religious affiliations were 34.8% Christian, 4.1% Hindu, 1.1% Islam, 1.0% Māori religious beliefs, 1.2% Buddhist, 0.5% New Age, and 1.3% other religions. People who answered that they had no religion were 49.6%, and 6.5% of people did not answer the census question.

Of those at least 15 years old, 939 (19.3%) people had a bachelor's or higher degree, 2,712 (55.7%) had a post-high school certificate or diploma, and 1,218 (25.0%) people exclusively held high school qualifications. The median income was $40,700, compared with $41,500 nationally. 336 people (6.9%) earned over $100,000 compared to 12.1% nationally. The employment status of those at least 15 was 2,484 (51.0%) full-time, 570 (11.7%) part-time, and 126 (2.6%) unemployed.

Individual statistical areas
Name	Area (km^{2})	Population	Density (per km^{2})	Dwellings	Median age	Median income
Palmerston North Airport	7.47	129	17	42	39.4 years	$53,800
Milson North	1.03	2,688	2,610	1,020	42.6 years	$37,400
Milson South	1.23	3,240	2,634	1,164	33.4 years	$42,700
New Zealand					38.1 years	$41,500

== Education ==
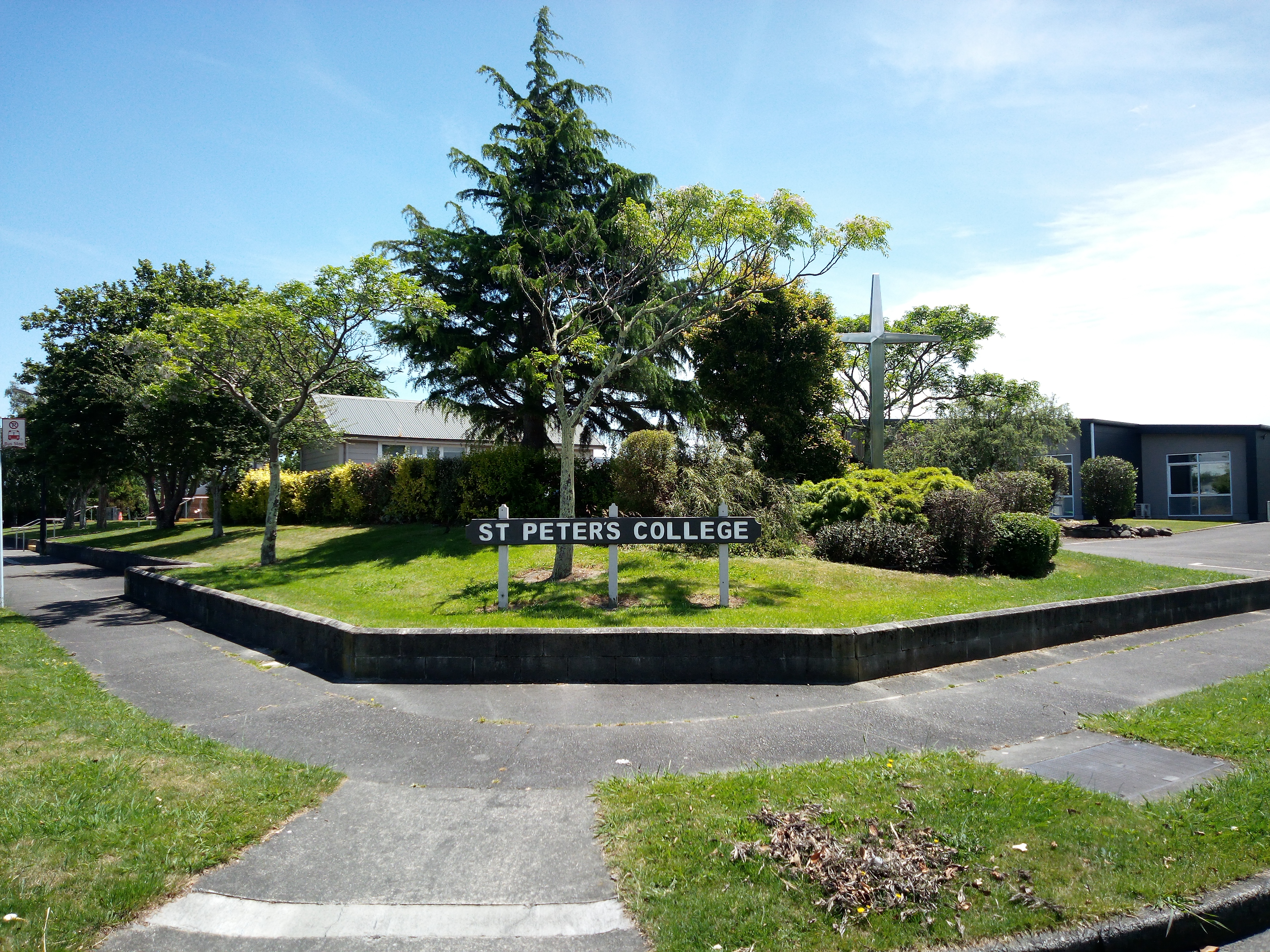
St Peter's College in 2025

Milson School is a contributing state primary school for Year 1 to 6 students, with a roll of 314. It opened in 1928.

St Peter's College is a state-integrated Catholic school for Year 7 to 13 students, with a roll of 798 as of March 2026. It opened in 1974.

Both schools are co-educational. Rolls are as of March 2026.
