= Palmerston North City Buses =

Former municipal transport operator in Palmerston North, New Zealand

- Parent: Palmerston North City Council
- Founded: 8 September 1921
- Ceased operation: 30 June 1991
- Headquarters: Palmerston North, New Zealand
- Service area: Palmerston North
- Service type: Bus services
- Routes: Various suburban and city routes
- Hubs: The Square (city centre)
- Depots: Albert Street (1921–1962), Church Street (1962–1991)
- Fleet: Varied (Commer, Leyland, Bedford, Ford, Hino, etc.)
- Fuel type: Petrol, diesel, compressed natural gas
- Operator: Palmerston North City Council

Palmerston North City Buses (also known variously as the Palmerston North Municipal Motor Service, Palmerston North City Bus Service or simply City Buses) was the municipal bus operation run by the Palmerston North City Council from 1921 until 1991. The system was bus-only from the outset, as the city never built a tramway network. It played a central role in connecting Palmerston North's suburbs with the city centre for seventy years, pioneering the use of compressed natural gas (CNG) vehicles in the 1980s before being sold off as part of nationwide deregulation.

For current services operated under contract to Horizons Regional Council, see Public transport in the Manawatū-Whanganui Region.

== Tramway proposal ==
In the early 20th century, Palmerston North's leaders were eager to introduce public transport to the borough. Other New Zealand centres (for example, Wanganui in 1908) had introduced electric tramways, and the Borough Council believed a similar system could spur growth.

In 1910 a public meeting debated options – cars, trams, or motor buses? – and it became clear that a tram or bus system was preferable to relying on private cars.

In 1911 the Council commissioned technical studies comparing an overhead-wire electric tramway (£68,300), Edison battery-powered trams (£44,573), and an Albion motor omnibus fleet (£4,590). At that stage the battery-tram system (later adopted in Gisborne) was favoured for its lower cost.

The Council decided to engage electrical engineer Frederick J. Black, who had designed tram networks in Wellington and provincial cities. In January 1912 Black recommended a conventional overhead electric tram with a municipal power station (initially two 75 kW diesel generators) rather than battery vehicles. He argued that combining tramways with public electricity supply would put the venture on firmer financial footing, noting: "a tramway undertaking when not combined with an electric lighting and power supply business is but the half of an enterprise, and the least profitable half at that".

The Council obtained a £60,000 tramways loan in 1912, and even floated ambitious ideas, such as building a tram subway under the railway station to avoid traffic conflicts. Alternative technologies were also explored: in 1914 an Australian firm proposed self-propelled petrol-electric tramcars (a hybrid without overhead wires), but these and all other plans were shelved upon the outbreak of World War I.

Despite the war, the Council took steps to prepare for an electric tram system. It exercised a longstanding option to buy out the private gasworks in 1915, giving the municipality control over local energy supply. In June 1916 the Tramway and Electric Light Loan of £86,000 went to the ratepayers and was approved. Of this, £66,000 was earmarked for tramway construction (about 5½ miles of track) and the remainder for a generating station and initial reticulation. However, wartime constraints meant no contractors could be engaged, and by the Armistice in 1918 the project had stalled.

During the hiatus, public opinion was not idle – a lively Trams vs. Motor Buses debate was held at the Opera House in 1915, revealing a contingent that questioned the tram plan's cost and practicality. By 1919, motor vehicle technology had advanced markedly thanks to the war, making motorbuses more reliable and cheaper. Several councillors began to doubt the tramway's wisdom, especially as private car ownership was also rising.

In 1920 the tramway scheme reached a decisive turning point. Post-war inflation had driven up construction costs by roughly 70%, forcing the Council to seek a new loan of £110,000 to cover the tramway and a now-enlarged power plant. A municipal referendum on 24 March 1920 produced a split verdict: the loan was rejected 727 votes to 844, with only 46% in favour. While the electric lighting portion was broadly supported, many voters balked at investing in trams. It appeared that electricity was desired "but it was seen as too late to install trams" in a motor age.

The Council was persuaded. After briefly considering a last-minute "modified" tram scheme, the Council voted to abandon the tramway project in mid-1920. Instead, attention turned to motor buses. In April 1920 the city's Tramways Committee commissioned a report comparing petrol buses vs. petrol-electric hybrids vs. electric trams to weigh costs and performance. Motorbuses won out.

In June 1920 Councillor Oram moved that the Council borrow £9,000 to purchase four buses and related equipment. This proposal was swiftly endorsed by ratepayers in a September 1920 poll, reflecting the public's desire for "sane progress" in the form of roads and buses rather than rails. Separately, the electric power station and lighting network – now separated from the tram plan – were put to a fresh vote and approved overwhelmingly (86% in favour) in May 1920.

== History ==
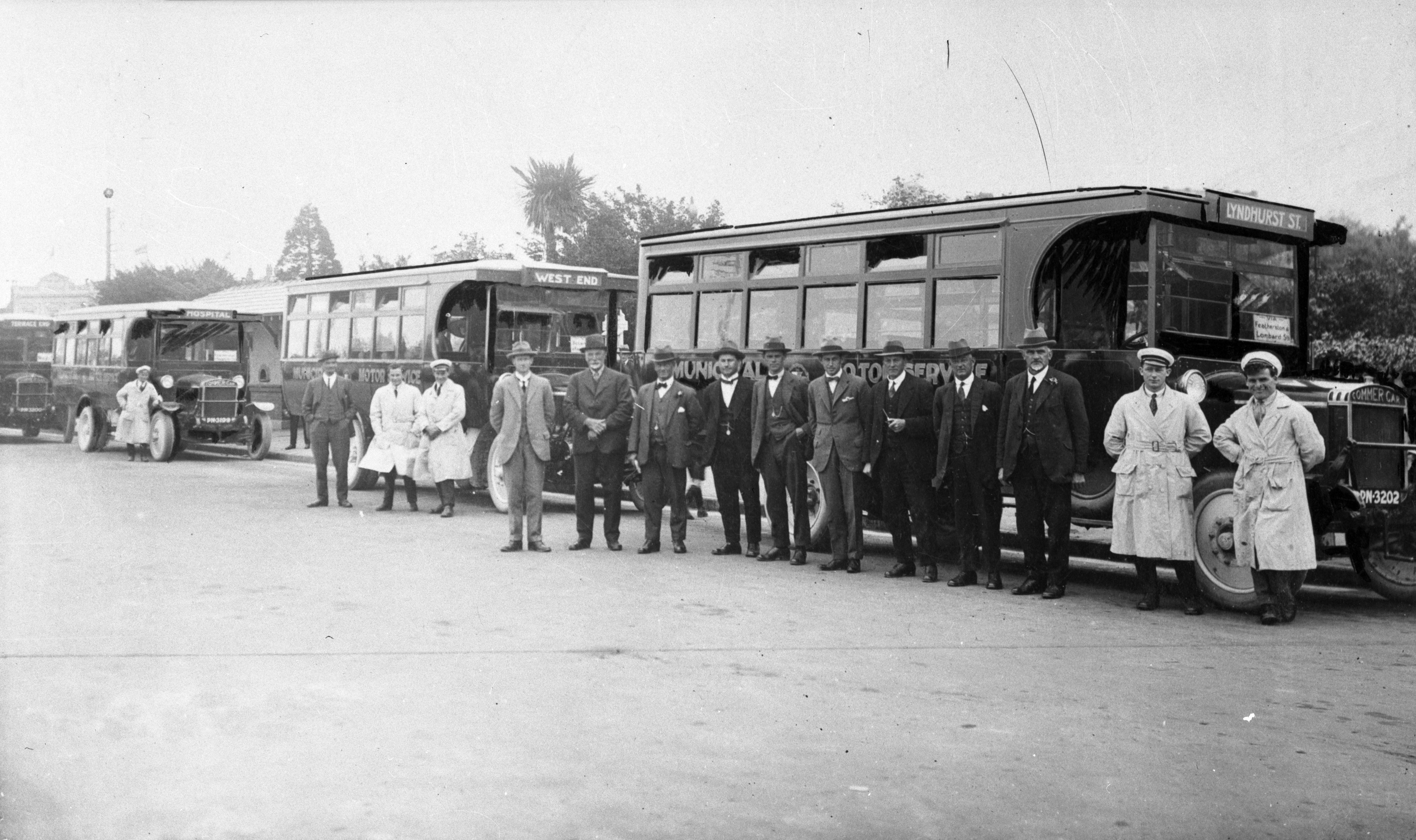
First Borough Council bus fleet, with drivers and official

The bus service began in September 1921 with four petrol-engined Commers seating 30 passengers, bodied by Bate & Bell of Napier. Services expanded quickly, and additional Dennises and Internationals were purchased in the 1920s, one bodied locally by G.P. Adler.

By the early 1930s the fleet was reaching the end of its useful life, and wholesale replacement began. Five Leyland Cubs bodied by Crawley Ridley were delivered in 1934–35, followed by four Leyland Tigers between 1936 and 1940. These marked the city's first substantial order of British-built buses and became the backbone of the fleet during the later Depression years.

After the Second World War, demand for services grew rapidly. Two petrol-engined Federals bodied by Crawley Ridley were acquired, but the council soon turned to the Ford V8s (one of the only chassis available post-war) with locally built "Steelbilt" bodies. By the mid-1950s had returned to larger Leyland orders. In 1955 three Tiger Cubs arrived, Palmerston North's first underfloor-engined buses, reflecting wider industry trends.

From the late 1950s into the 1960s the fleet diversified. Bedford SBs, along with a pair of Bedford J2 minibuses were acquired, though the latter proved too small and short-lived. Between 1960 and 1969 nineteen Morris truck chassis were bodied for bus use, along with a Ford Thames Trader. Four Bedford VAMs followed in 1968–69, supplemented by second-hand purchases from other councils.

In the 1970s Palmerston North bought buses to coach specifications to compete for charter and tour work. This included a Leyland Leopard in 1979 and a group of second-hand KEA MkIIIs, originally built for North Shore Transport. These were followed by a mix of Bedford and Ford chassis with NZ Motor Bodies dual-purpose coachwork.

The 1980s saw a major renewal programme with an emphasis on alternative fuels. Seventeen Bedford SBs entered service between 1980 and 1982, five fitted with Commuter 1 and twelve with Commuter 2 bodies and powered by compressed natural gas (CNG). Hino chassis were also introduced from 1983, with further deliveries in 1986–89. By the late 1980s, the CNG-powered Hinos and Bedfords formed the majority of the fleet, reflecting the council's pioneering role in alternative fuel use.

The fleet was sold when the council exited bus operations on 30 June 1991.

=== Fleet summary ===
Decade	Main types acquired	Bodybuilders	Notes
1920s	Commer (30-seat), Dennis, International	Bate & Bell (Napier), G.P. Adler (Palmerston North)	Four Commers opened the service in 1921; supplemented by small batches of British and American chassis
1930s	Leyland Cub, Leyland Tiger	Crawley Ridley, Munt Cotterill Neilsen	First large replacement programme; Cubs delivered 1934–35, Tigers 1936–40
1940s	Federal, Ford V8	Crawley Ridley, NZ Motor Bodies (Steelbilt)	Post-war demand met by Ford V8s with Steelbilt bodies; Federals filled gaps until larger Leylands could be sourced
1950s	Leyland Tiger Cub	NZ Motor Bodies	First underfloor-engined buses (1955); three Tiger Cubs marked a shift towards modern chassis
1960s	Morris FHK140/FHK702, Ford Thames Trader, Bedford VAM	Hawke, NZ Motor Bodies, H. Commander	Fleet diversification; nineteen Morris truck chassis converted, plus four Bedford VAMs
1970s	KEA MkII, Leyland Leopard, Bedford/Ford coaches	NZ Motor Bodies, KEA workshops	Second-hand KEAs from Auckland; Leopard delivered 1979; buses built to coach spec for charter/tour markets
1980s	Bedford SB (CNG), Hino BX341/CM277/RK176	NZ Motor Bodies, CI Conquest, Modern Motor Bodies	Major renewal programme; Palmerston North pioneered CNG buses (17 delivered 1980–82, plus Hinos 1983–89)

Palmerston North Municipal Buses
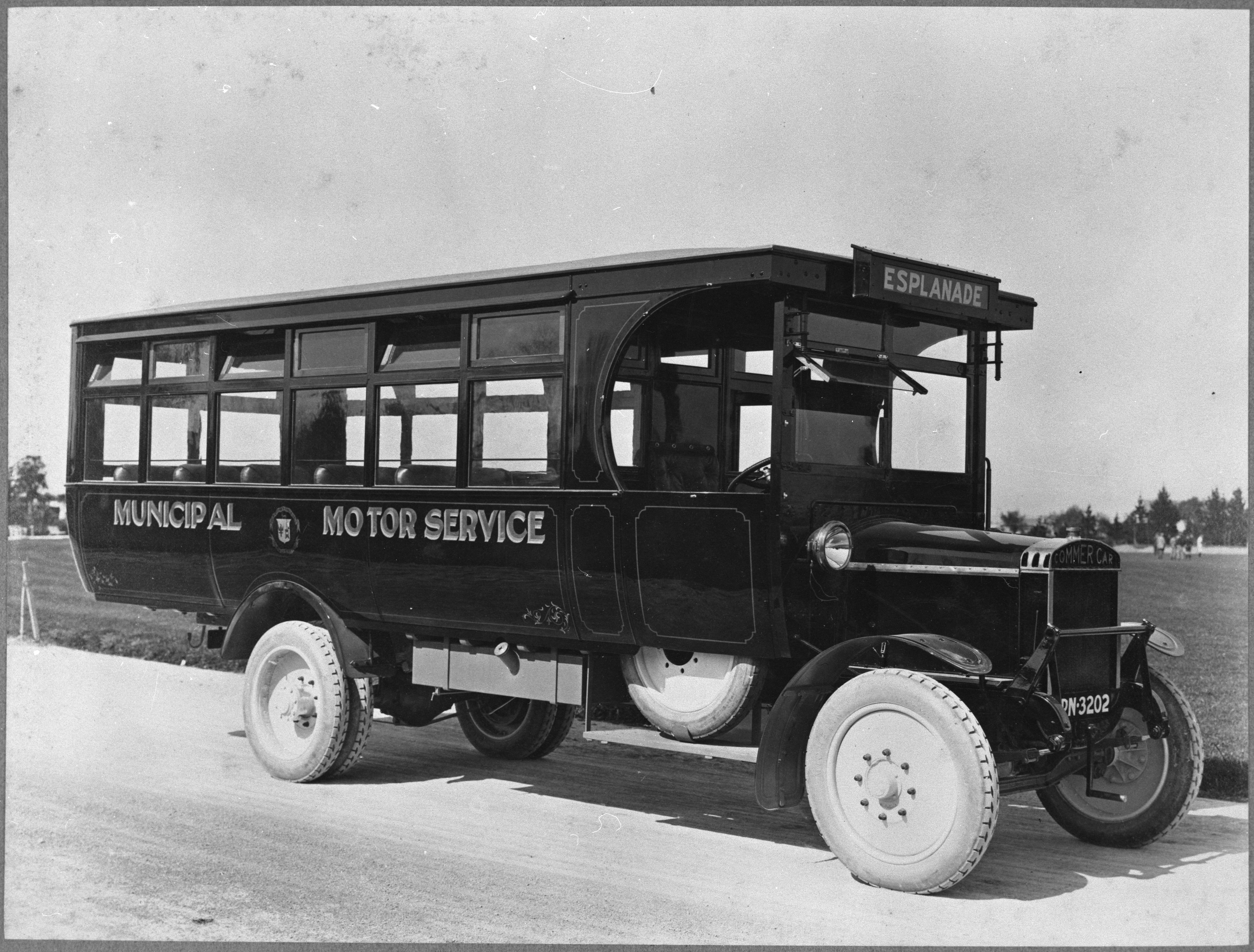
First buses used by Palmerston North

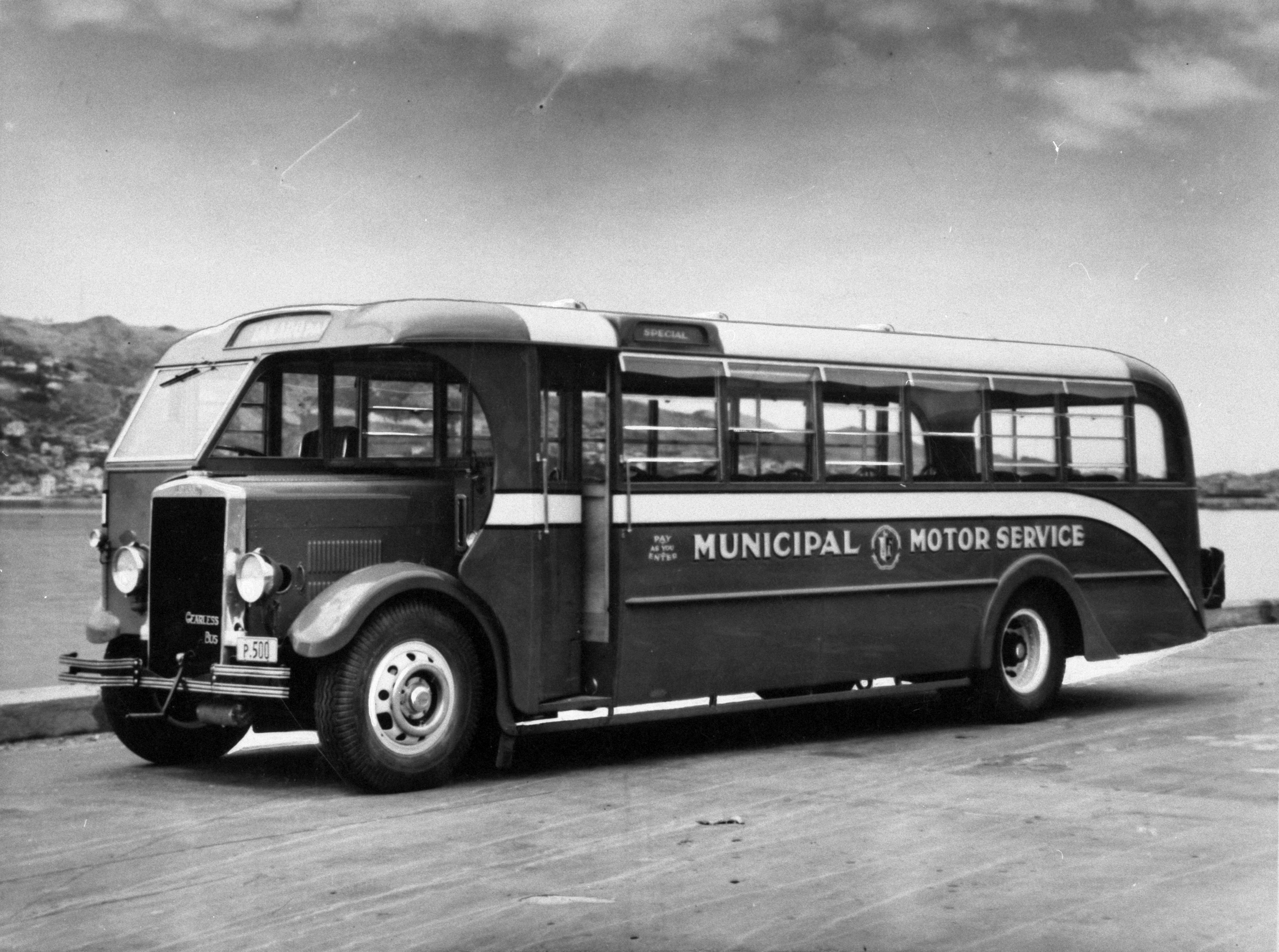
Leyland Tiger bus from the mid 1930s

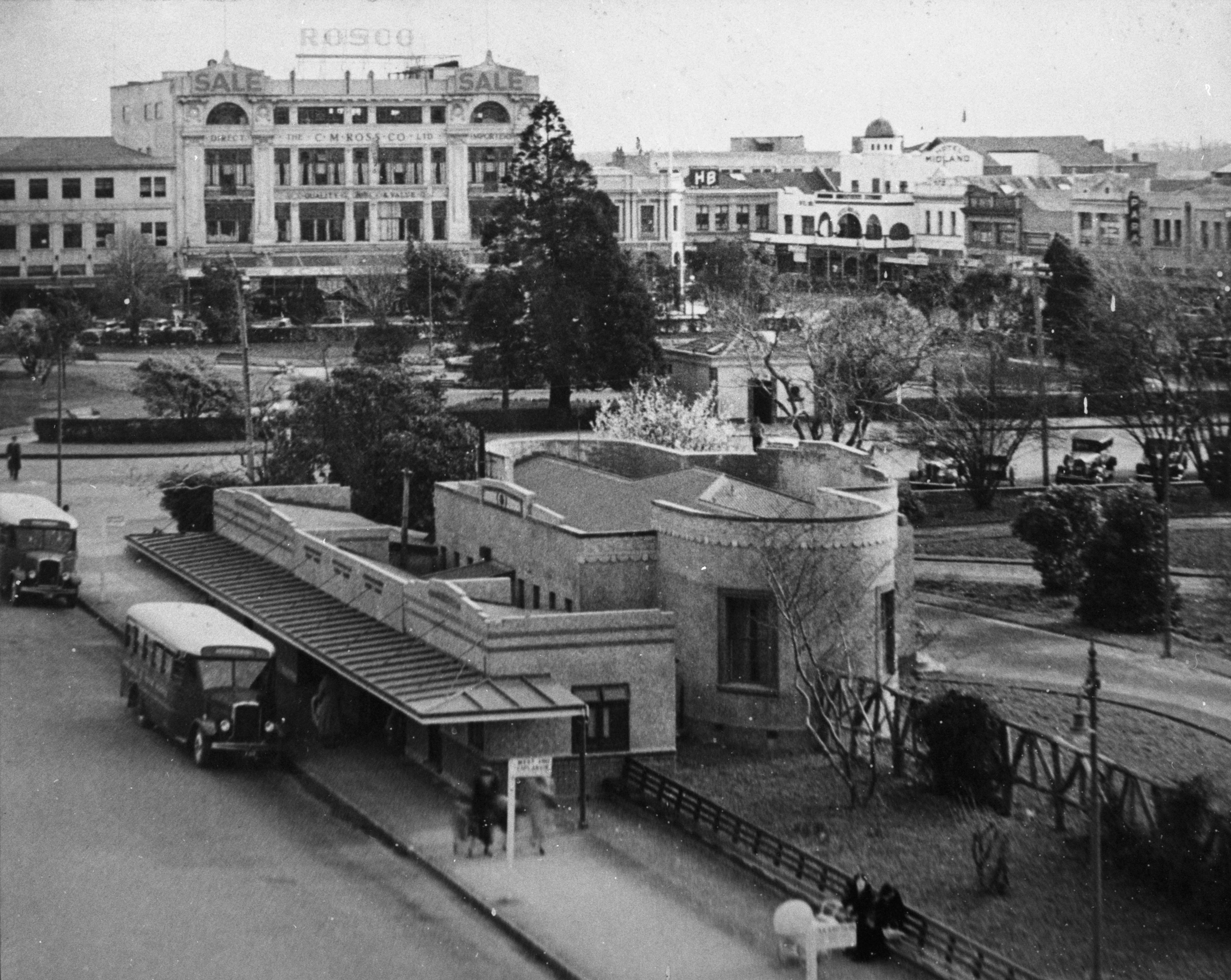
Buses in the Square circa 1940

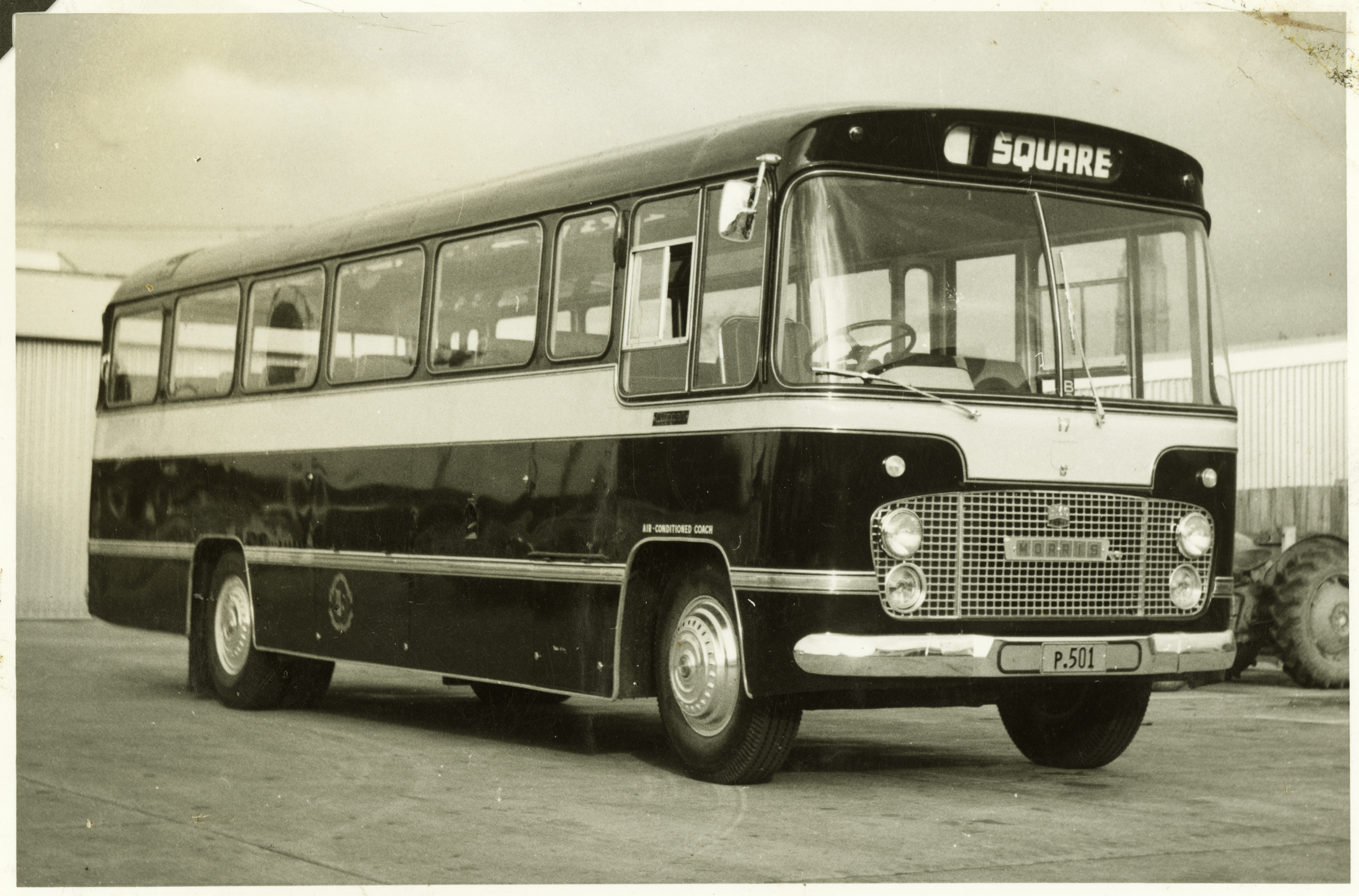
Morris 702 bus - fleet number 17

Colour image of Morris 702 bus

== Routes ==
The original network was set up as a radial network, focused on The Square. Early services connected the city centre with the Public Hospital, Terrace End, Hokowhitu, West End, Lyndhurst Street and the Esplanade. As the city grew, routes expanded with new destinations including Milson, Ross Block, Wood Street, Takaro, Massey College, and a daily service to Kelvin Grove Cemetery.

In September 1928, routes listed included (with passenger numbers): Hospital (15,907), Terrace End (13,364), Hokowhitu (5,588), West End (5,052), Takaro Park (4,562), and Esplanade (2,266).

In 1932 permission was received to extend the Esplanade service three times a day to Massey College, along with a request to run into Milson.

Fares were based on how many zones were travelled, with concessions for workers and schoolchildren keeping the service affordable.

The bus service was not always profitable. In 1930 it was suggested that the bus service might be sold to private enterprise after the service made a loss of £1498 for the year, with a forecast loss in 1931 of £1905. The suggestion was that private operators would run only paying routes, leaving lightly patronised routes to be subsidised or stopped.

The exact streets a bus route would pass along changed on a fairly regular basis, both as the city grew and as vehicle ownership increased. Sometimes service would reach beyond the city boundary, such as in 1950 when services reached Milson and Maxwells Line Road, which were then part of Kairanga County.

As Palmerston North expanded, routes were extended deeper into Awapuni, Westbrook and Milson, with increased focus on the Massey University corridor as enrolments grew. Evening and weekend coverage was adjusted periodically in response to demand and budgets, and some peripheral sections were shortened as car ownership rose. The 1976–77 bus station on Church Street became the principal interchange for both city routes and regional coaches. On deregulation in 1991, the council network was replaced by taxi-bus operations and later contracted services (see Post-1991 operations).

=== 1957 route example ===
A 1957 city timetable gives a glimpse of how the network was structured in the immediate post-war years. Twelve routes radiated from The Square, serving both the older suburbs and the newly expanding growth areas around Awapuni, Roslyn and Hokowhitu. Coverage reflected the lower vehicle ownership, with overlapping services and shorter length runs.

Route	Destination(s)	Notes and Key Streets
1	Vogel St via Hospital	Featherston St East, Ruahine St, Tremaine Ave, Thames St, Tyne St, Vogel St.
2	Hospital via Grey St	Grey St, Russell St, Florence Ave, Heretaunga St, Tremaine Ave, Roy St, Featherston St East.
3	Gillespies Line via Tremaine Ave	Rangitikei St, Tremaine Ave, Botanical Road, Liverpool St, Aberdeen Ave, Guy St.
4	Roslyn via Main St	Grey St, Ruahine Ave, Main St East, Vogel St, Clyde Cres and return.
5	Roslyn via Featherston St	Featherston St East, Vogel St, Rangiora Ave and return.
6	West End via College St	College St West, Maxwells Line, Long Melford Road, Melford Road, College St, Botanical Road, Park Road, Cook St.
7	Terrace End via Church St	Church St East, Ruahine St, Ferguson St East, Manson St, Ihle St, Miller St, Napier Rd, Brightwater Tce and return.
8	Hokowhitu via College St	College St East, Albert St, Pahiatua St, Ruahine St, Franklin Ave, Winstone Ave and return.
9	Esplanade via Fitzherbert Ave	Fitzherbert Ave, Te Awe Awe St, Jickell St, Hardie St and return. Some services extend to Centennial Ave or Massey College.
10	Hokowhitu via Park Road	Park Road, Victoria Ave, Te Awe Awe St, Ihaka St, Albert St, Manawatu St, Crew Cres, Ashford Ave and return.
11	Gooding Block via Ferguson St	Ferguson St West, West St, Pioneer Hwy, Nottingham Ave, Rugby St, Cardiff St and return.
12	Takaro via Featherston St	Featherston St West, Botanical Ave, Chelwood St, Lyndhurst St, Cuba St, Bryant St and return.

== Depots and infrastructure ==
The first bus garage and workshops were established off Albert Street in 1921. In 1962 operations shifted to a larger depot on Church Street to accommodate a growing fleet and workshop requirements.

The main city bus terminal was originally located in the square. A new bus station opened alongside the depot in 1977, functioning as the principal passenger hub for both city and rural buses and as a terminal for regional coach services. The station was removed after the council exited bus operations in 1991.

== Post-1991 operations ==
On 30 July 1991 Palmerston North City Council withdrew from public transport, closing its City Bus service and selling the municipal fleet to a variety of operators. Responsibility for urban services passed to the Palmerston North Taxi Co-operative, which introduced a new model of operation using 10–11 seat Toyota HiAce vans branded as "Bux-Taxis". For the heavily used Massey University service, the co-operative also purchased three second-hand Mercedes-Benz O305 buses from Auckland.

Although the system ran without direct subsidy and the vans generally coped with available demand, capacity limitations were soon evident. Contemporary reports suggested that up to 20% of trips required an extra taxi to be dispatched to carry passengers who could not be accommodated in the vans. Visibility of the system was also limited, as the vans were painted as taxis rather than conventional buses. Accessibility proved another weakness, particularly for elderly or mobility-impaired passengers who found the small, high-stepped vehicles difficult to use. At the same time, use of the subsidised Total Mobility scheme rose sharply, suggesting the van-based service was not meeting the needs of all passengers.

In 1996 the regional council concluded that taxi-buses did not provide an adequate service to the whole community. It introduced a new contract with minimum standards, requiring vehicles with at least 18 seats, higher roofs and automatic doors. The tender was awarded to a new company, Total City Buses, while the taxi co-operative vowed to continue in competition. This created a turbulent period in which two operators overlapped, but Total City Buses collapsed on 25 September 1998. Transit Coachlines stepped in and assumed all Palmerston North urban routes on 28 September 1998, restoring stability to the network.

== Subsequent services ==
For the subsequent history of bus operations in Palmerston North see Public transport in the Manawatū-Whanganui Region.

== Maps showing bus routes over the years ==
- 1950 map showing bus routes
- 1959 map showing bus routes
- 1964 map showing bus routes
- 1969 map showing bus routes
- 1973 map showing bus routes
- 1980 map showing bus routes
- 1985 map showing bus routes
- 1989 map showing bus routes
