= Roslyn, Palmerston North =

Suburb of Palmerston North

Roslyn
- Suburb
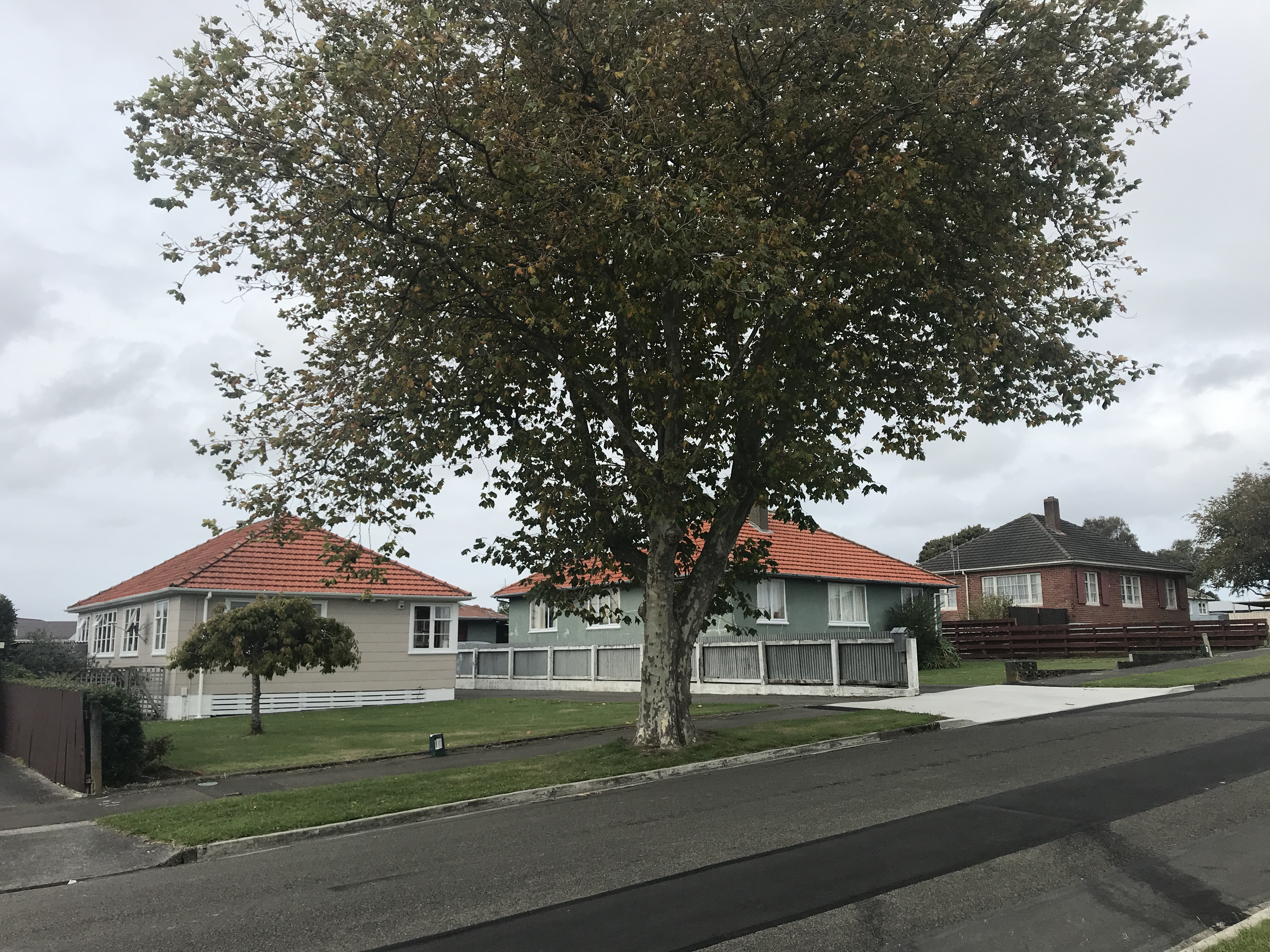
- A street in Roslyn
- Interactive map of Roslyn
- Coordinates: 40°20′9.17″S 175°37′47.09″E
- Country: New Zealand
- City: Palmerston North
- Local authority: Palmerston North City Council
- Electoral ward: Te Hirawanui General Ward; Te Pūao Māori Ward
- Established: 1948

Area
  - Land: 115 ha (280 acres)

Population (June 2025)
  - Total: 2,580
  - Density: 2,240/km^{2} (5,810/sq mi)

Milson		Kelvin Grove
	Roslyn
	Papaioea	Terrace End

Roslyn is a suburb in the city of Palmerston North, Manawatū-Whanganui, New Zealand.

It is located 3 kilometres (1.9 mi) north-east of the central city and bounded on the north by the North Island Main Trunk Railway (Milson), on the east by Palmerston North-Gisborne Railway (Kelvin Grove), the south by Main Street East (Terrace End) and the west by Ruahine Street (Palmerston North Hospital Area). Roslyn is also located 2.1 km SE from Palmerston North International Airport.

The suburb is predominantly residential and at the 2018 Census it had a population of 2,364.

== History ==
Richter, Nannestad & Co., a sawmilling company, acquired and cleared the vast deep forested area northeast of Palmerston North. In 1879, the company owned 600 acres of land in the area between Vogel Street, North St, Boundary Rd (now Tremaine Ave) and Featherston Street.

In 1900, Robert Price Edwards established a brick-making business at the site of the current Edwards Pit Park, He constructed the Hoffman Kiln at the site in 1904, which could fire 9,000 bricks in a single chamber using clay that was dug from the site. The kiln building is now a protected heritage building.

In 1902, Charles Mackintosh Ross, founder of Rosco (CM Ross and Co) purchased land in the east end of Featherston Street and built a house in 1908, Rangimarie (still extant). In 1924, Ross died, the property passing to his wife (who lived at the house until her death thirty years later). In 1940, Mrs Ross sold land around Rangimarie to the Government, which became the basis of a new state house subdivision. The Government later purchased more land nearby.

The area was known as Ross Block until 1948, when it was renamed Roslyn. Unfortunately, when the Post Office was established here, there was already a Roslyn in Dunedin. Therefore, the Terrace End-Roslyn Progressive Association had to find another name for the area. Rossmont was chosen because of the location; the fact the area is higher up from the rest of Palmerston North. Recently, perhaps because of the local primary school, the name Roslyn has resurfaced.

The area now Roslyn has been known under many names including Ross Block, Ross, Rossmont and Terrace End. Until recently Statistics New Zealand identified those who live in Roslyn as it is now, lived in Terrace End. Terrace End as it is now, was known as Brightwater.

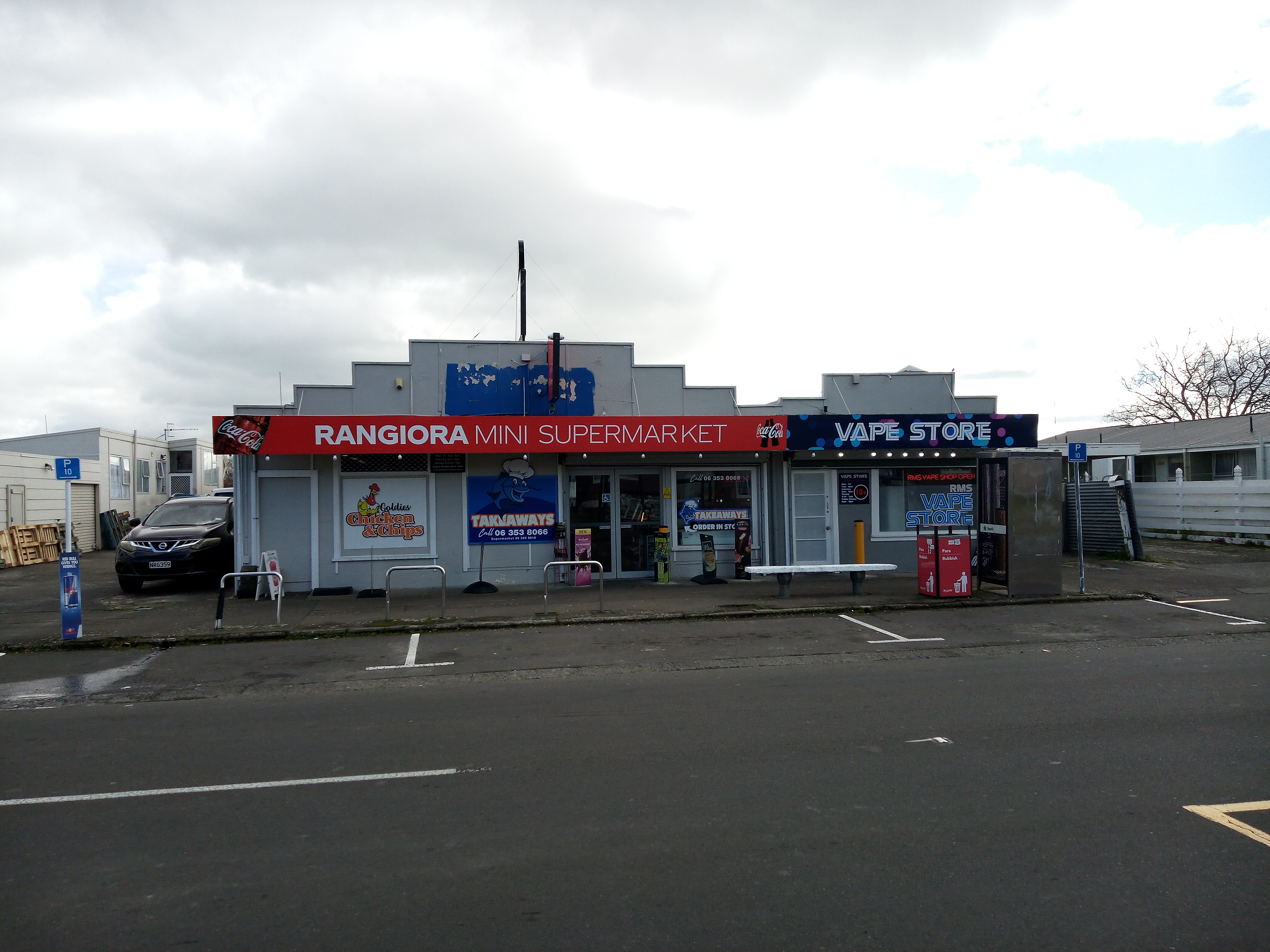
The Rangiora Mini Supermarket, in the heart of Roslyn

== Demographics ==
Roslyn covers 1.15 km^{2} (0.44 sq mi) and had an estimated population of 2,580 as of June 2025, with a population density of 2,243 people per km^{2}.

Historical population
Year	Pop.	±% p.a.
2006	2,169	—
2013	2,229	+0.39%
2018	2,364	+1.18%
2023	2,451	+0.73%

Roslyn had a population of 2,451 in the 2023 New Zealand census, an increase of 87 people (3.7%) since the 2018 census, and an increase of 222 people (10.0%) since the 2013 census. There were 1,203 males, 1,227 females, and 24 people of other genders in 921 dwellings. 5.1% of people identified as LGBTIQ+. The median age was 33.0 years (compared with 38.1 years nationally). There were 510 people (20.8%) aged under 15 years, 594 (24.2%) aged 15 to 29, 1,035 (42.2%) aged 30 to 64, and 309 (12.6%) aged 65 or older.

People could identify as more than one ethnicity. The results were 66.7% European (Pākehā); 23.3% Māori; 8.4% Pasifika; 19.3% Asian; 1.7% Middle Eastern, Latin American and African New Zealanders (MELAA); and 1.2% other, which includes people giving their ethnicity as "New Zealander". English was spoken by 95.1%, Māori by 5.9%, Samoan by 1.5%, and other languages by 16.6%. No language could be spoken by 2.4% (e.g. too young to talk). New Zealand Sign Language was known by 1.3%. The percentage of people born overseas was 25.0, compared with 28.8% nationally.

Religious affiliations were 32.8% Christian, 3.4% Hindu, 2.6% Islam, 0.6% Māori religious beliefs, 0.9% Buddhist, 0.7% New Age, 0.1% Jewish, and 2.3% other religions. People who answered that they had no religion were 50.2%, and 6.7% of people did not answer the census question.

Of those at least 15 years old, 420 (21.6%) people had a bachelor's or higher degree, 1,020 (52.6%) had a post-high school certificate or diploma, and 498 (25.7%) people exclusively held high school qualifications. The median income was $39,500, compared with $41,500 nationally. 93 people (4.8%) earned over $100,000 compared to 12.1% nationally. The employment status of those at least 15 was 1,020 (52.6%) full-time, 231 (11.9%) part-time, and 72 (3.7%) unemployed.

== Features ==
Roslyn has a community policing centre and fire station, a community pool, a local pub, and numerous shops. There is a large industrial zone which manufactures concrete and plastic pipes, agricultural feed, distributing hubs, car parts are present also.

Terrace End Cemetery, the oldest cemetery in Palmerston North, is located at the foot of Vogel Street.

Skogland Park, a football park, is named after former MP Phil Skoglund.

Vautier Park, a former Edwards Brick and Pipes quarry site and Palmerston North's main outdoor netball park, is named for Catherine Vautier, a former teacher at QEC who was instrumental in the formation of Manawatu Netball.

Edwards Pit Park, a former Brick and Pipes site and former soccer ground, has been redeveloped with native trees, waterways and paths.

Norton Park, which features a wetland and the remnants of Little Kawau Stream.

Hulme Street Reserve is also located in Roslyn.

Many Roslyn street names are named after well-known writers or Victoria Cross recipients.

== Government ==
Roslyn was formerly a part of the Papaioea Ward of the Palmerston North City Council, alongside neighbouring Milson, Papaioea, Palmerston North Hospital Area and Kelvin Grove.

Prior to 1996, Roslyn north and east of Featherston Street was part of the Manawatu electorate, while Roslyn south of Featherston Street was in Palmerston North electorate. The entire suburb is now part of the Palmerston North electorate and Māori electorate of Te Tai Hauāuru.

== Education ==
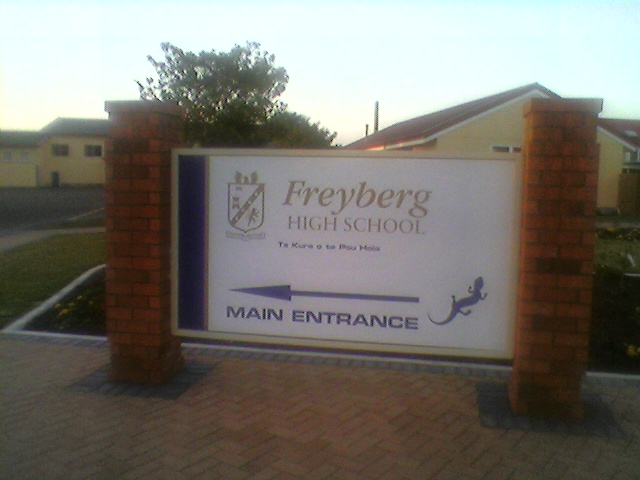
Main entrance to Freyberg High School

Freyberg High School, a state high school, is located in Roslyn. with a roll of 1,007. It includes the Whakatipuria Teen Parent Unit. The school opened in 1955.

Roslyn School is a full primary school for Year 1 to 8 students, with a roll of 373 as of March 2026. It opened in 1953.

Ross Intermediate is a state intermediate school for Year 7 to 8 students, with a roll of 438 as of March 2026. It opened in 1958.

St Mary's School is a state integrated Catholic primary school for Year 1 to 6 student, with a roll of 207 as of March 2026. It opened in 1950.

All these schools are co-educational. Rolls are as of March 2026.

== Notable people ==
- Former MP Steve Maharey (Labour) spent some of his early life in Roslyn
- Hugo Inglis Black Sticks hockey player grew up in Roslyn
- Polly Inglis, Otago Sparks cricketer, grew up in Roslyn
