= Terrace End =

Suburb of Palmerston North

- Suburb
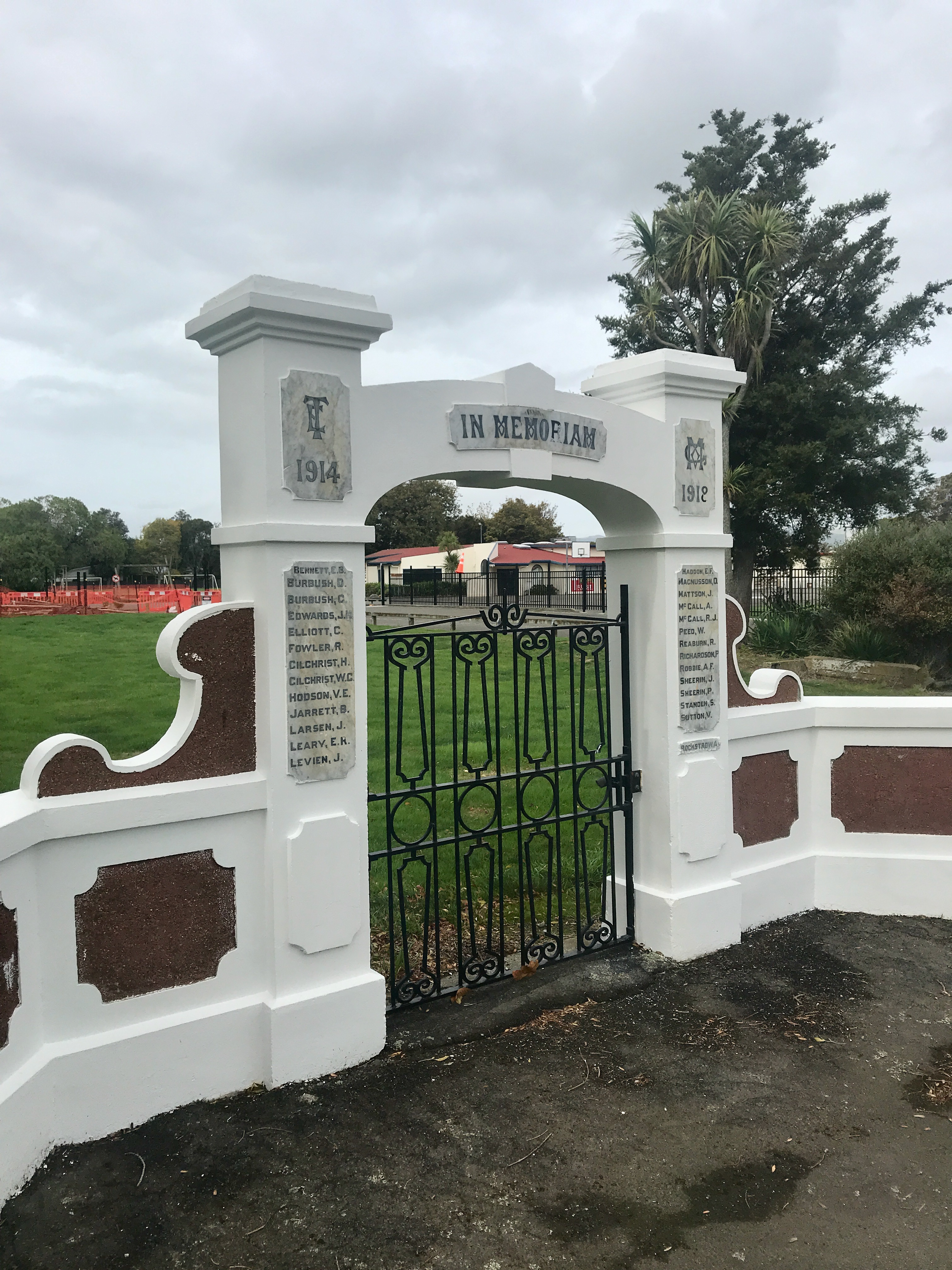
- Memorial arch, Terrace End School
- Interactive map of Terrace End
- Coordinates: 40°20′57″S 175°38′11″E
- Country: New Zealand
- City: Palmerston North
- Local authority: Palmerston North City Council
- Electoral ward: Te Hirawanui General Ward; Te Pūao Māori Ward

Area
  - Land: 273 ha (670 acres)

Population (June 2025)
  - Total: 6,560
  - Density: 2,400/km^{2} (6,220/sq mi)

Roslyn		Kelvin Grove
Papaioea	Terrace End
Palmerston North Central	Hokowhitu	Aokautere

Terrace End is a suburb of Palmerston North, New Zealand.

Terrace End is located in the south east part of the city on a bend in the Manawatū River. It is bounded to the north by Main Street East, Roslyn and Kelvin Grove. On the east by Whakarongo, the south by the Manawatū River and Hokowhitu and the west by Ruahine Street, Papaioea and Hokowhitu. The suburb is predominantly residential. The estimated population was 6,560 in March 2026.

The area includes Palmerston North Golf Club, Brightwater Centre, Memorial Park, Balmoral Park and Ruamahanga Wilderness Reserve.

== Demographics ==
Terrace End covers 2.73 km^{2} (1.05 sq mi) and had an estimated population of 6,560 as of June 2025, with a population density of 2,403 people per km^{2}.

Historical population
Year	Pop.	±% p.a.
2006	5,778	—
2013	5,898	+0.29%
2018	6,177	+0.93%
2023	6,363	+0.60%

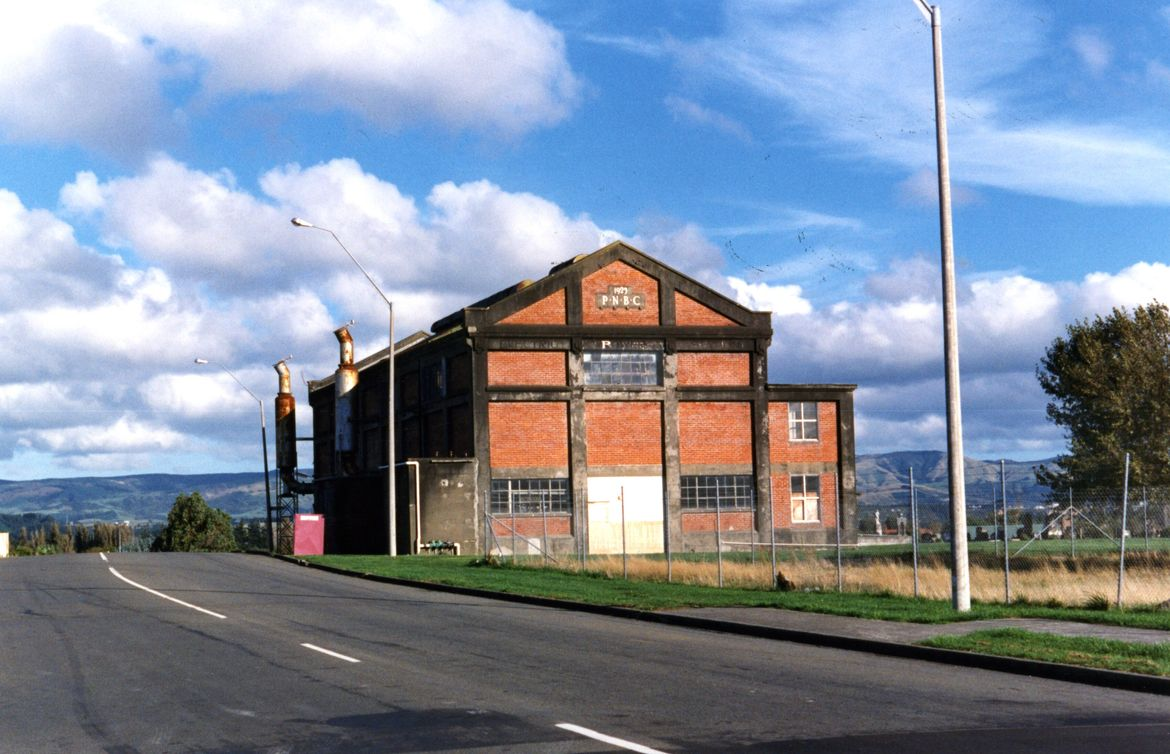
The Keith Street power station.

Terrace End had a population of 6,363 in the 2023 New Zealand census, an increase of 186 people (3.0%) since the 2018 census, and an increase of 465 people (7.9%) since the 2013 census. There were 3,090 males, 3,231 females, and 45 people of other genders in 2,355 dwellings. 4.8% of people identified as LGBTIQ+. There were 1,284 people (20.2%) aged under 15 years, 1,404 (22.1%) aged 15 to 29, 2,766 (43.5%) aged 30 to 64, and 906 (14.2%) aged 65 or older.

People could identify as more than one ethnicity. The results were 73.7% European (Pākehā); 23.9% Māori; 6.6% Pasifika; 13.3% Asian; 2.0% Middle Eastern, Latin American and African New Zealanders (MELAA); and 3.2% other, which includes people giving their ethnicity as "New Zealander". English was spoken by 95.2%, Māori by 5.7%, Samoan by 1.1%, and other languages by 12.9%. No language could be spoken by 2.5% (e.g. too young to talk). New Zealand Sign Language was known by 1.0%. The percentage of people born overseas was 20.1, compared with 28.8% nationally.

Religious affiliations were 31.5% Christian, 1.8% Hindu, 2.6% Islam, 1.3% Māori religious beliefs, 0.6% Buddhist, 0.5% New Age, and 1.5% other religions. People who answered that they had no religion were 52.2%, and 8.1% of people did not answer the census question.

Of those at least 15 years old, 1,119 (22.0%) people had a bachelor's or higher degree, 2,667 (52.5%) had a post-high school certificate or diploma, and 1,290 (25.4%) people exclusively held high school qualifications. 366 people (7.2%) earned over $100,000 compared to 12.1% nationally. The employment status of those at least 15 was 2,475 (48.7%) full-time, 681 (13.4%) part-time, and 183 (3.6%) unemployed.

Individual statistical areas
Name	Area (km^{2})	Population	Density (per km^{2})	Dwellings	Median age	Median income
Terrace End	1.20	3,582	2,985	1,341	34.9 years	$32,700
Ruamahanga	1.53	2,781	1,818	1,014	35.5 years	$39,700
New Zealand					38.1 years	$41,500

== Education ==
Terrace End School is a state primary school for Year 1 to 6 students, with a roll of 207. It opened in 1884.

Parkland School is also a state primary school for Year 1 to 6 students, with a roll of 289 as of March 2026. It opened in 1974.

Both these schools are co-educational. Rolls are as of March 2026,
