= Papaioea =

Suburb of Palmerston North

- Suburb
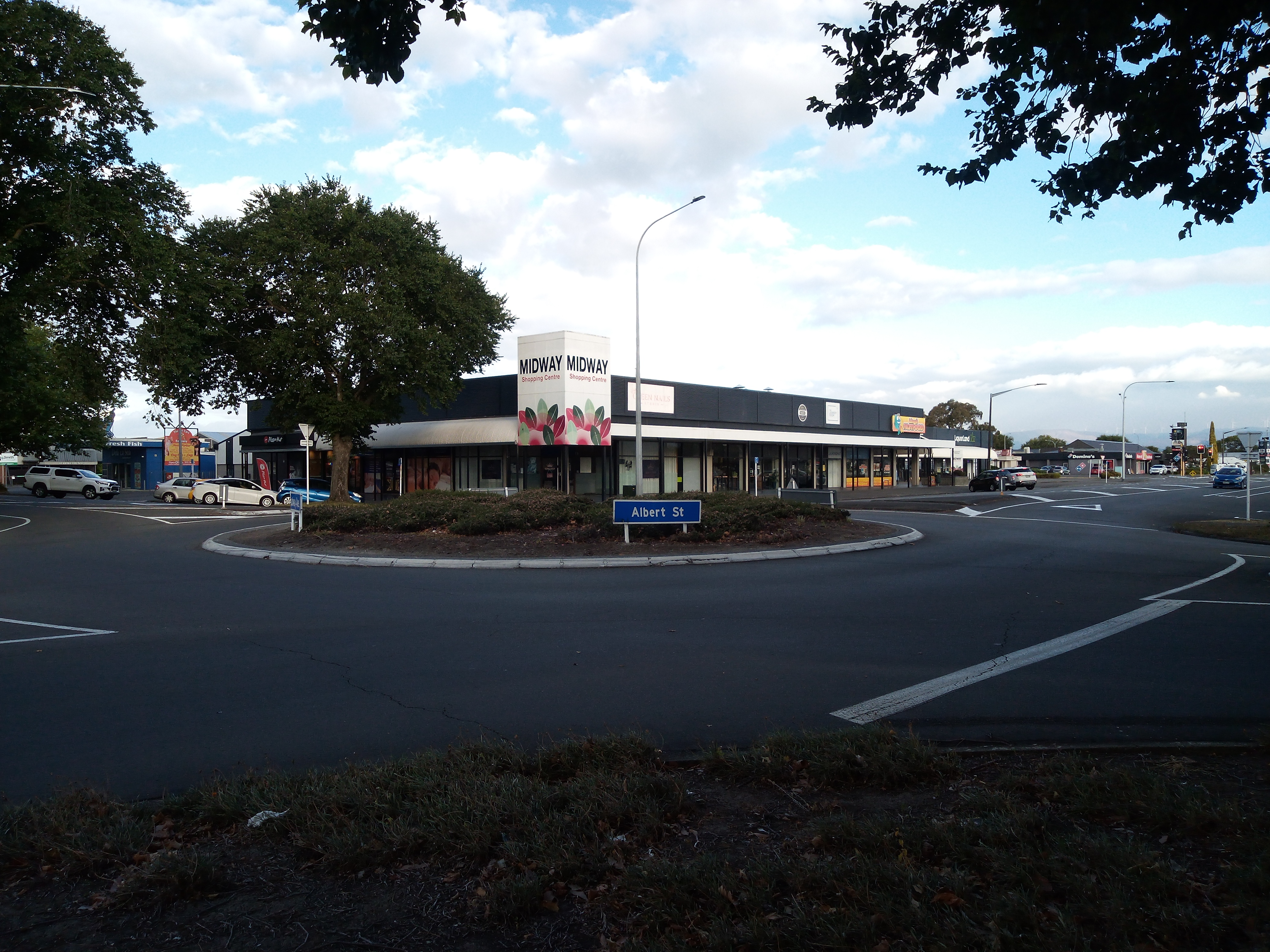
- Corner Broadway and Albert Street, Papaioea
- Interactive map of Papaioea
- Coordinates: 40.3479°S 175.622°E
- Country: New Zealand
- City: Palmerston North
- Local authority: Palmerston North City Council
- Electoral ward: Te Hirawanui General Ward; Te Pūao Māori Ward

Area
  - Land: 248 ha (610 acres)

Population (June 2025)
  - Total: 7,040
  - Density: 2,840/km^{2} (7,350/sq mi)
- Hospitals: Palmerston North Hospital

| Cloverlea | Milson | Roslyn |
| Takaro | Papaioea | Terrace End |
| Palmerston North Central | | Hokowhitu |

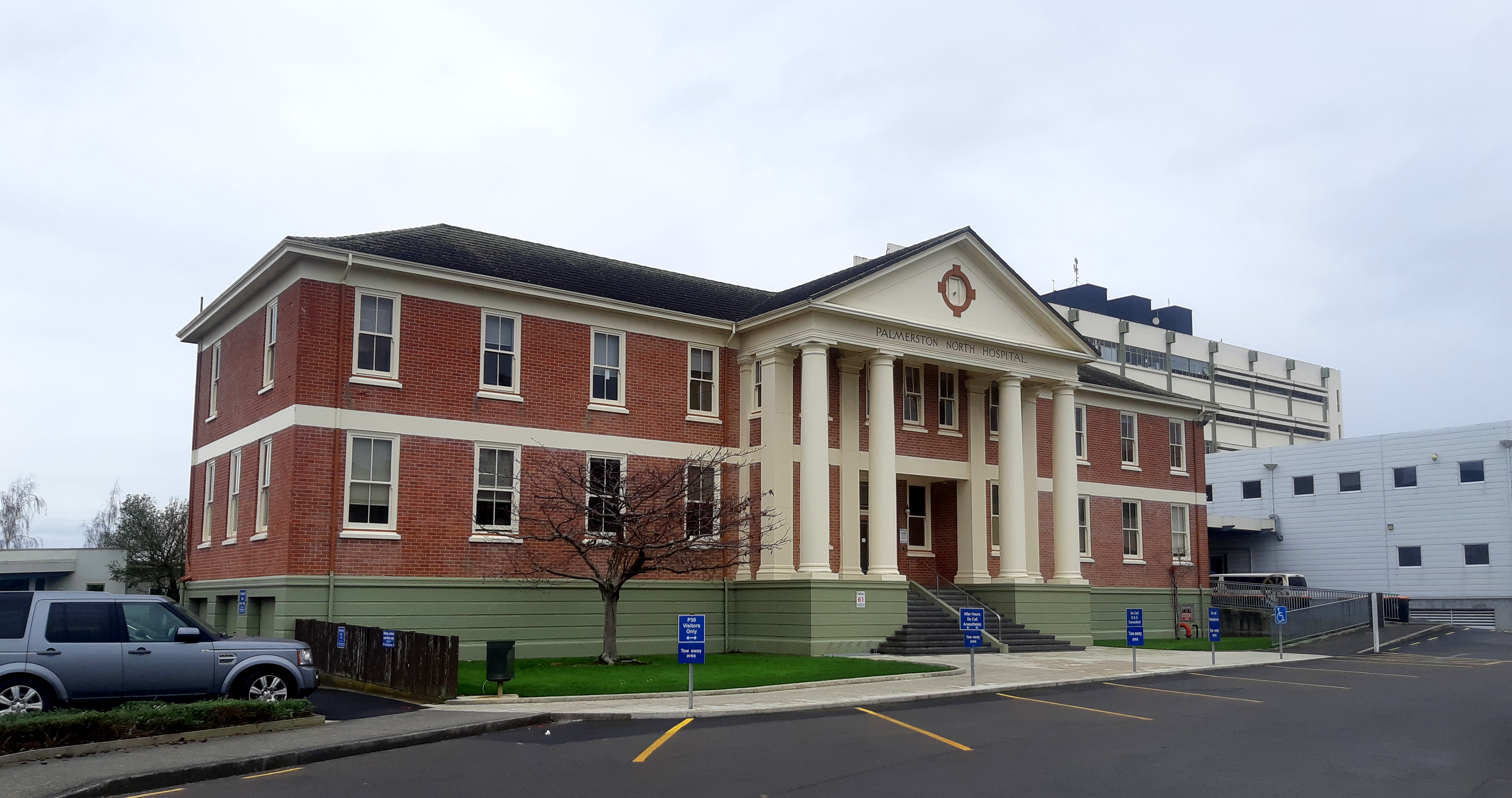
Administration building at Palmerston North Hospital

Papaioea is a suburb of Palmerston North on New Zealand's North Island.

Its name comes from the name of the original settlement in a clearing in forest which was purchased from local Māori (Ngāti Rangitāne) in 1864.The name was used to describe Palmerston North also. Somewhat later, the name had become forgotten with the transliteration of Pāmutana being preferred (especially by the Native Land Court).

The name Papaioea did not resurface until the 1920s, and is sometimes used to refer to Palmerston North as a whole.

Papaioea has many shops, food outlets and supermarkets, including Terrace End Shopping Centre (Broadtop) on Broadway Avenue. There are real estate agencies, a veterinarian clinic, medical clinics and several churches, including Broadway Methodist Church.

Aorangi Hospital, formerly known as Mercy Hospital, was a private hospital in the northwest of the suburb. It has since been demolished, with services moved to Crest Hospital in nearby Carroll Street. The site is now occupied by Broadway Radiology who occupy a new, modern building.

Horizons Regional Councils office is also located in Papaioea.

Papaioea Park is located in the north of the suburb. It is used as a football ground and cricket ground by lower club grades, and is walled on the Featherston Street and Ruahine Street boundary.

Palmerston North Borough Council decided to reserve land for the park in the 1920s They chose the name Papaioea to commemorate the original settlement in the area. There was a spelling mistake and the name was spelt "Papaeoia". This was not corrected until the 1970s.

The first stage of a new social housing development opened in the area in 2019. Palmerston North City Council applied for Government funding for a second stage of the project during the coronavirus pandemic in 2020.

The Palmerston North Hospital area is identified as a separate area by Statistics New Zealand. On the southern side of Tremaine Avenue is a predominantly suburban area, with tree lined streets and avenues. The north side of Tremaine Avenue is dominated by commercial and industrial businesses. Features in the area include Arohanui Hospice, the Northern Bowling Club, Rimu Lodge Rest Home, Willard Rest Home, and Wahikoa Park.

== Demographics ==
Papaioea covers 2.48 km^{2} (0.96 sq mi) and had an estimated population of 7,040 as of June 2025, with a population density of 2,839 people per km^{2}.

Historical population
| Year | Pop. | ±% p.a. |
|---|---|---|
| 2006 | 6,783 | — |
| 2013 | 6,582 | −0.43% |
| 2018 | 7,020 | +1.30% |
| 2023 | 6,879 | −0.40% |

Papaioea had a population of 6,879 in the 2023 New Zealand census, a decrease of 141 people (−2.0%) since the 2018 census, and an increase of 297 people (4.5%) since the 2013 census. There were 3,270 males, 3,561 females, and 51 people of other genders in 2,943 dwellings. 4.8% of people identified as LGBTIQ+. The median age was 38.8 years (compared with 38.1 years nationally). There were 1,035 people (15.0%) aged under 15 years, 1,587 (23.1%) aged 15 to 29, 2,889 (42.0%) aged 30 to 64, and 1,368 (19.9%) aged 65 or older.

People could identify as more than one ethnicity. The results were 73.3% European (Pākehā); 17.6% Māori; 4.5% Pasifika; 16.5% Asian; 1.6% Middle Eastern, Latin American and African New Zealanders (MELAA); and 3.0% other, which includes people giving their ethnicity as "New Zealander". English was spoken by 95.9%, Māori by 4.4%, Samoan by 0.9%, and other languages by 15.4%. No language could be spoken by 1.8% (e.g. too young to talk). New Zealand Sign Language was known by 0.8%. The percentage of people born overseas was 23.9, compared with 28.8% nationally.

Religious affiliations were 33.4% Christian, 2.6% Hindu, 1.6% Islam, 1.0% Māori religious beliefs, 0.8% Buddhist, 0.9% New Age, 0.1% Jewish, and 2.3% other religions. People who answered that they had no religion were 50.3%, and 7.2% of people did not answer the census question.

Of those at least 15 years old, 1,542 (26.4%) people had a bachelor's or higher degree, 2,913 (49.8%) had a post-high school certificate or diploma, and 1,386 (23.7%) people exclusively held high school qualifications. The median income was $37,300, compared with $41,500 nationally. 507 people (8.7%) earned over $100,000 compared to 12.1% nationally. The employment status of those at least 15 was 2,802 (47.9%) full-time, 801 (13.7%) part-time, and 189 (3.2%) unemployed.

Individual statistical areas
| Name | Area (km^{2}) | Population | Density (per km^{2}) | Dwellings | Median age | Median income |
|---|---|---|---|---|---|---|
| Palmerston North Hospital | 1.07 | 2,541 | 2,375 | 957 | 41.2 years | $43,500 |
| Papaioea North | 0.80 | 2,454 | 3,068 | 1,107 | 40.3 years | $32,300 |
| Papaioea South | 0.60 | 1,884 | 3,140 | 882 | 35.2 years | $36,900 |
| New Zealand | | | | | 38.1 years | $41,500 |

== Education ==
Russell Street School is a co-educational state primary school for Year 1 to 6 students, with a roll of 323 as of July 2026. It opened in 1929.

There are also two other schools within the area: Palmerston North Boys' High School and Queen Elizabeth College.
