= Whakarongo =

Suburb of Palmerston North

- Suburb of Palmerston North
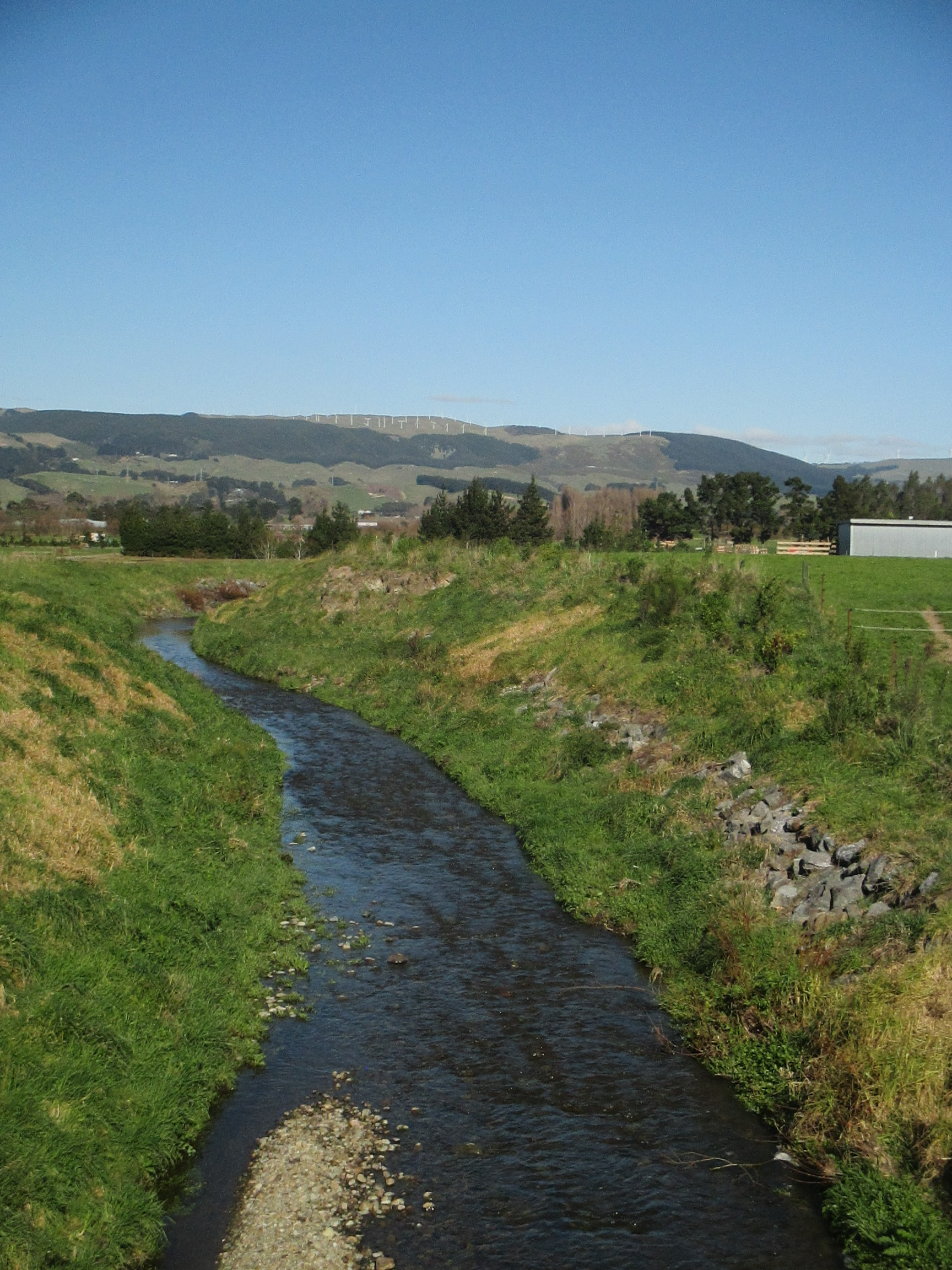
- Stony Creek
- Interactive map of Whakarongo
- Coordinates: 40°20′S 175°40′E
- Country: New Zealand
- Region: Manawatū-Whanganui region
- Territorial authorities: Palmerston North
- Ward: Te Hirawanui General Ward; Te Pūao Māori Ward
- Electorates: Palmerston North; Te Tai Hauāuru (Māori)

Government
  - Territorial Authority: Palmerston North City Council
  - Regional council: Horizons Regional Council
  - Mayor of Palmerston North: Grant Smith
  - Palmerston North MP: Tangi Utikere
  - Te Tai Hauāuru MP: Debbie Ngarewa-Packer

Area
  - Total: 51.23 km^{2} (19.78 sq mi)

Population (June 2025)
  - Total: 1,810
  - Density: 35.3/km^{2} (91.5/sq mi)
- Postcode: 4470
- Telephone: 06

Whakarongo is a suburb of Palmerston North, New Zealand, between the city and Ashhurst. It is mainly rural, and features many vegetable gardens.

Whakarongo was originally named Stoney Creek and along with neighbouring Kelvin Grove was part of the Stoney Creek Scandinavian and Roadmen's Block. The area was one of the first Special Settlements established by the Government (along with Karere Scandinavian Block, between Awapuni and Longburn). In 1926 the post office name was changed from Whakaronga to Whakarongo, though the names continued to be used interchangeably.

The original Scandinavian settlers were the first to arrive under Vogel's Immigration and Public Works Scheme. The majority arrived on the second ship (England) which arrived in April 1871, with a handful from the first ship (Celaeno) which arrived in February 1871. The Roadmen were mainly the British 'workmates' of the Scandinavian settlers.

Kelvin Grove Cemetery was established in Whakarongo in 1927.

There are no parks in the area.

State Highway 3 passes through Whakarongo on Napier Road. Stoney Creek Road, named after the original settlement, connects the area with Bunnythorpe.

== Demographics ==
Whakarongo covers 51.23 km^{2} (19.78 sq mi) and had an estimated population of 1,810 as of June 2025, with a population density of 35 people per km^{2}.

Historical population
Year	Pop.	±% p.a.
2006	1,170	—
2013	1,407	+2.67%
2018	1,644	+3.16%
2023	1,758	+1.35%

Whakarongo had a population of 1,758 in the 2023 New Zealand census, an increase of 114 people (6.9%) since the 2018 census, and an increase of 351 people (24.9%) since the 2013 census. There were 921 males, 834 females, and 3 people of other genders in 606 dwellings. 1.9% of people identified as LGBTIQ+. The median age was 46.1 years (compared with 38.1 years nationally). There were 333 people (18.9%) aged under 15 years, 249 (14.2%) aged 15 to 29, 852 (48.5%) aged 30 to 64, and 327 (18.6%) aged 65 or older.

People could identify as more than one ethnicity. The results were 90.8% European (Pākehā); 12.1% Māori; 1.9% Pasifika; 5.1% Asian; 0.5% Middle Eastern, Latin American and African New Zealanders (MELAA); and 2.9% other, which includes people giving their ethnicity as "New Zealander". English was spoken by 97.4%, Māori by 1.4%, Samoan by 0.3%, and other languages by 6.0%. No language could be spoken by 1.5% (e.g. too young to talk). New Zealand Sign Language was known by 0.5%. The percentage of people born overseas was 11.6, compared with 28.8% nationally.

Religious affiliations were 35.7% Christian, 0.7% Hindu, 0.5% Islam, 0.3% Māori religious beliefs, 0.2% Buddhist, 0.3% New Age, and 1.0% other religions. People who answered that they had no religion were 53.8%, and 7.8% of people did not answer the census question.

Of those at least 15 years old, 354 (24.8%) people had a bachelor's or higher degree, 834 (58.5%) had a post-high school certificate or diploma, and 243 (17.1%) people exclusively held high school qualifications. The median income was $52,200, compared with $41,500 nationally. 276 people (19.4%) earned over $100,000 compared to 12.1% nationally. The employment status of those at least 15 was 774 (54.3%) full-time, 264 (18.5%) part-time, and 30 (2.1%) unemployed.

== Education ==
Whakarongo School is a co-educational state primary school for Year 1 to 8 students, with a roll of 474 as of July 2026. It opened in 1877 as Stoney Creek School.
