= Westbrook =

Westbrook may refer to:

== People ==
- Westbrook (surname), includes a list of notable people with this surname
- Westbrook Pegler (1894–1969), American journalist
- Westbrook Van Voorhis (1903-1968), American voice actor

== Places ==
=== Australia ===
- Westbrook, Queensland, a town south-west of Toowoomba.

=== New Zealand ===
- Westbrook, New Zealand, a suburb of Palmerston North

=== South Africa ===
- Westbrook, KwaZulu-Natal, a coastal village north of Durban

=== United Kingdom ===
- Westbrook, Berkshire
- Westbrook, Kent, part of Margate
- Westbrook, Herefordshire
- Westbrook, Warrington, a council ward in Warrington, Cheshire
- Westbrook, Wiltshire, a settlement in the civil parish of Bromham, Wiltshire

=== United States ===
- Westbrook, Connecticut, a town in Middlesex County
- Westbrook, Maine, a city in Cumberland County
- Westbrook, Minnesota, a small city in Cottonwood County
- Westbrook, Missouri, a ghost town
- Westbrook, Texas, a city in Mitchell County

== Transportation ==
- Westbrook station (Calgary), CTrain station in Calgary, Alberta, Canada
- Westbrook station (Minnesota), in Westbrook, Minnesota, United States
- Westbrook station (Connecticut), in Westbrook, Connecticut, United States
- Westbrook railway station (England), former station in Dorstone, Herefordshire, England
- Westbrook railway station, Auckland, former station in Auckland, New Zealand

== Other uses ==
- Westbrook, Suffolk County, New York, a large estate house listed on the National Register of Historic places in Great River, New York, U.S.
- Westbrook Intermediate School, a middle school in Houston, Texas, U.S.
- Westbrook (company), entertainment company founded by Will and Jada Pinkett Smith
- "Westbrook", a 2017 song by JID from DiCaprio 2

== See also ==
- West Brook (disambiguation)
