= Cloverlea =

Suburb of Palmerston North, New Zealand

- Suburb
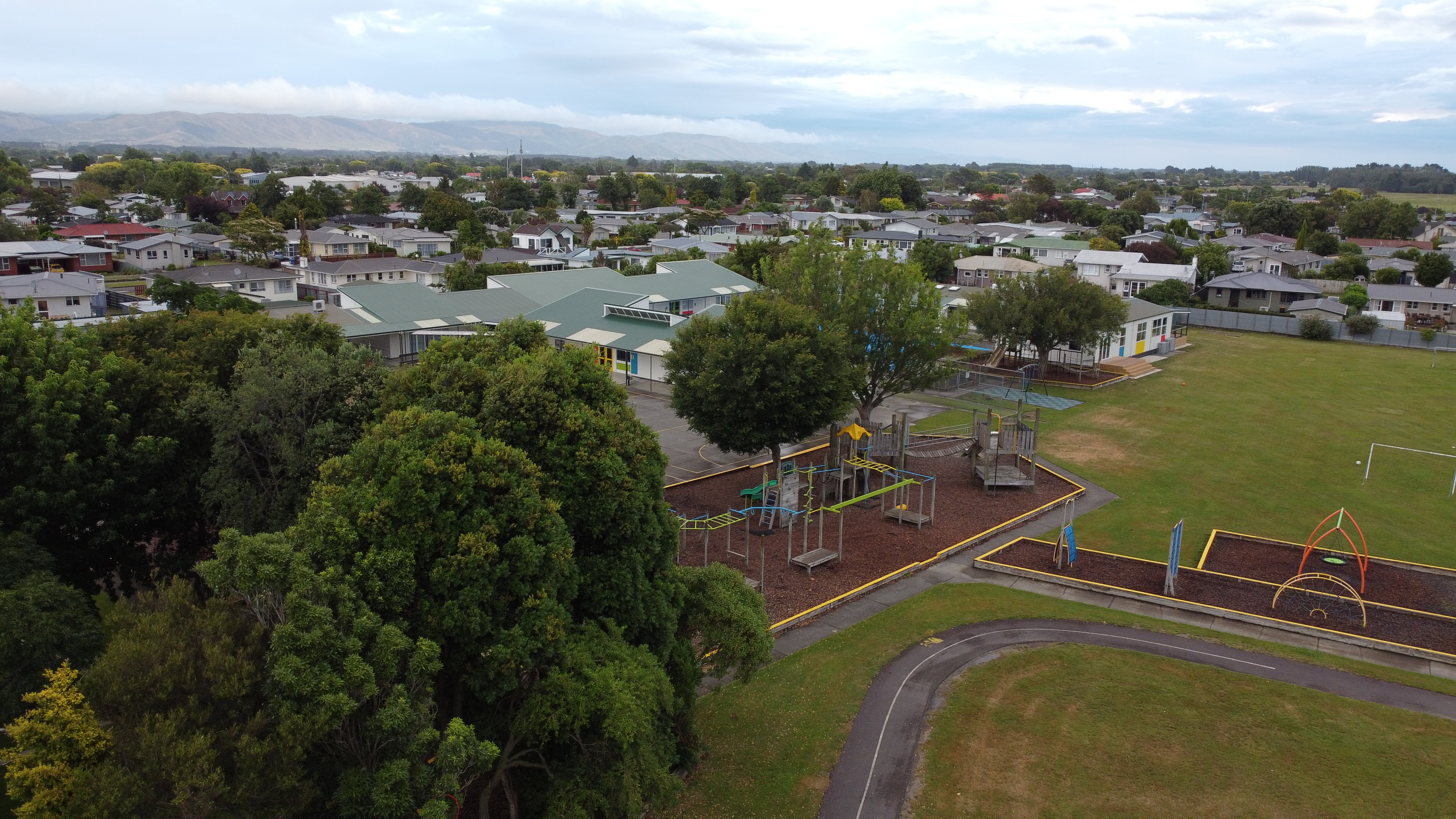
- Cloverlea Primary School
- Interactive map of Cloverlea
- Coordinates: 40.3464°S 175.5837°E
- Country: New Zealand
- City: Palmerston North
- Local authority: Palmerston North City Council
- Electoral ward: Te Hirawanui General Ward; Te Pūao Māori Ward

Area
  - Land: 68 ha (170 acres)

Population (June 2025)
  - Total: 1,960
  - Density: 2,900/km^{2} (7,500/sq mi)

Newbury		Milson
	Cloverlea	Palmerston North Hospital
Westbrook	Highbury	Takaro

Cloverlea is a suburb of Palmerston North, New Zealand. The suburb is located in the north-western part of town. Its boundaries are currently between Rangitikei Line and Gillespies Line.

The suburb takes its name from the Cloverlea homestead and property built and developed by David Buick MP between 1881 and his death during the influenza pandemic of 1918. Mr Buick ran a successful horse stud in addition to farming sheep and cattle at Cloverlea. He was the Member of Parliament for Palmerston North from 1908 until his death in 1918. Cloverlea is located at 102 No 1 Line, Palmerston North 4475.

Under the Discharged Soldiers' Settlement Act 1915 the government purchased 273 acres (110.5 ha) from the Buick estate and allocated 15 sections by ballot held 5 November 1919 to servicemen and nurses returning from the First World War. The area was known as Cloverlea Soldier Settlement which over time contracted to Cloverlea. However, the area to which this Cloverlea refers is not the more recent suburban development located north east of Highbury, north west of Palmerston North Hospital Area and north of Takaro, but an area about Cloverlea Road which serviced the settlement.

The Mangaone Stream walkway runs along the edge of Cloverlea, it starts all the way in Milson and ends by the Manawatu River.

In 2018, the suburb had a resident population of 1,893.

Cloverlea is a part of the Palmerston North electorate.

== Demographics ==
Cloverlea covers 0.68 km^{2} (0.26 sq mi) and had an estimated population of 1,960 as of June 2025, with a population density of 2,882 people per km^{2}.

Historical population
Year	Pop.	±% p.a.
2006	1,989	—
2013	1,866	−0.91%
2018	1,893	+0.29%
2023	1,905	+0.13%

Cloverlea had a population of 1,905 in the 2023 New Zealand census, an increase of 12 people (0.6%) since the 2018 census, and an increase of 39 people (2.1%) since the 2013 census. There were 900 males, 993 females, and 12 people of other genders in 744 dwellings. 3.6% of people identified as LGBTIQ+. The median age was 35.7 years (compared with 38.1 years nationally). There were 378 people (19.8%) aged under 15 years, 408 (21.4%) aged 15 to 29, 804 (42.2%) aged 30 to 64, and 315 (16.5%) aged 65 or older.

People could identify as more than one ethnicity. The results were 78.1% European (Pākehā); 28.5% Māori; 6.3% Pasifika; 6.1% Asian; 0.8% Middle Eastern, Latin American and African New Zealanders (MELAA); and 2.5% other, which includes people giving their ethnicity as "New Zealander". English was spoken by 97.0%, Māori by 6.5%, Samoan by 0.9%, and other languages by 6.5%. No language could be spoken by 2.2% (e.g. too young to talk). New Zealand Sign Language was known by 0.9%. The percentage of people born overseas was 12.1, compared with 28.8% nationally.

Religious affiliations were 27.2% Christian, 0.9% Hindu, 0.5% Islam, 1.1% Māori religious beliefs, 0.3% Buddhist, 0.6% New Age, and 1.4% other religions. People who answered that they had no religion were 59.7%, and 8.2% of people did not answer the census question.

Of those at least 15 years old, 249 (16.3%) people had a bachelor's or higher degree, 915 (59.9%) had a post-high school certificate or diploma, and 372 (24.4%) people exclusively held high school qualifications. The median income was $42,700, compared with $41,500 nationally. 90 people (5.9%) earned over $100,000 compared to 12.1% nationally. The employment status of those at least 15 was 810 (53.0%) full-time, 186 (12.2%) part-time, and 48 (3.1%) unemployed.

== Education ==
Cloverlea School is a co-educational state primary school for Year 1 to 6 students, with a roll of 229 as of March 2026. It opened in 1975.
