= Palmerston North Central =

Central business district of Palmerston North

- Suburb
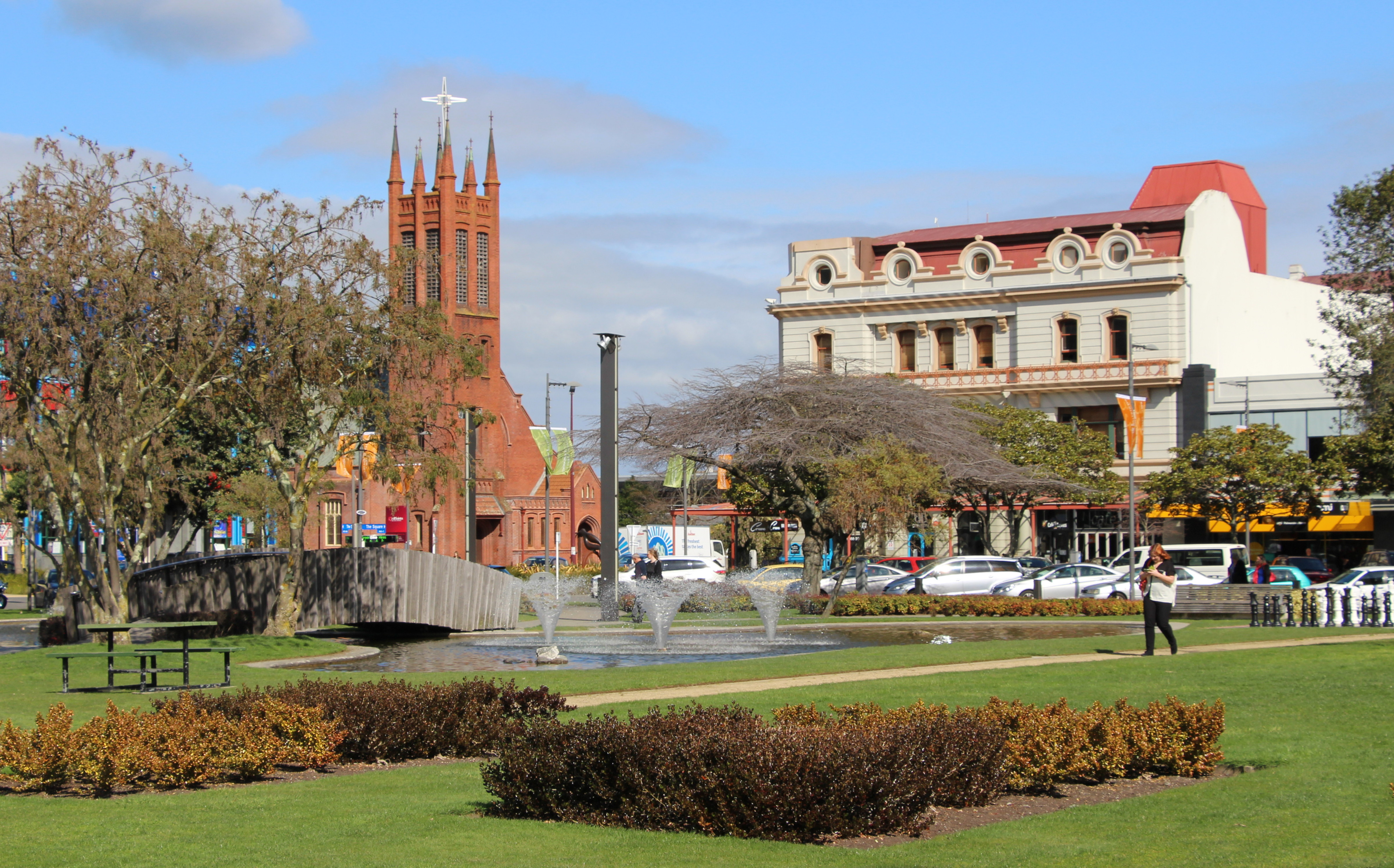
- The Square
- Interactive map of Palmerston North Central
- Coordinates: 40.356°S 175.611°E
- Country: New Zealand
- City: Palmerston North
- Local authority: Palmerston North City Council
- Electoral ward: Te Hirawanui General Ward; Te Pūao Māori Ward

Area
  - Land: 184 ha (450 acres)

Population (June 2025)
  - Total: 1,160
  - Density: 630/km^{2} (1,630/sq mi)
- Railway stations: Palmerston North railway station

Takaro		Papaioea
	Palmerston North Central
Awapuni	West End	Hokowhitu

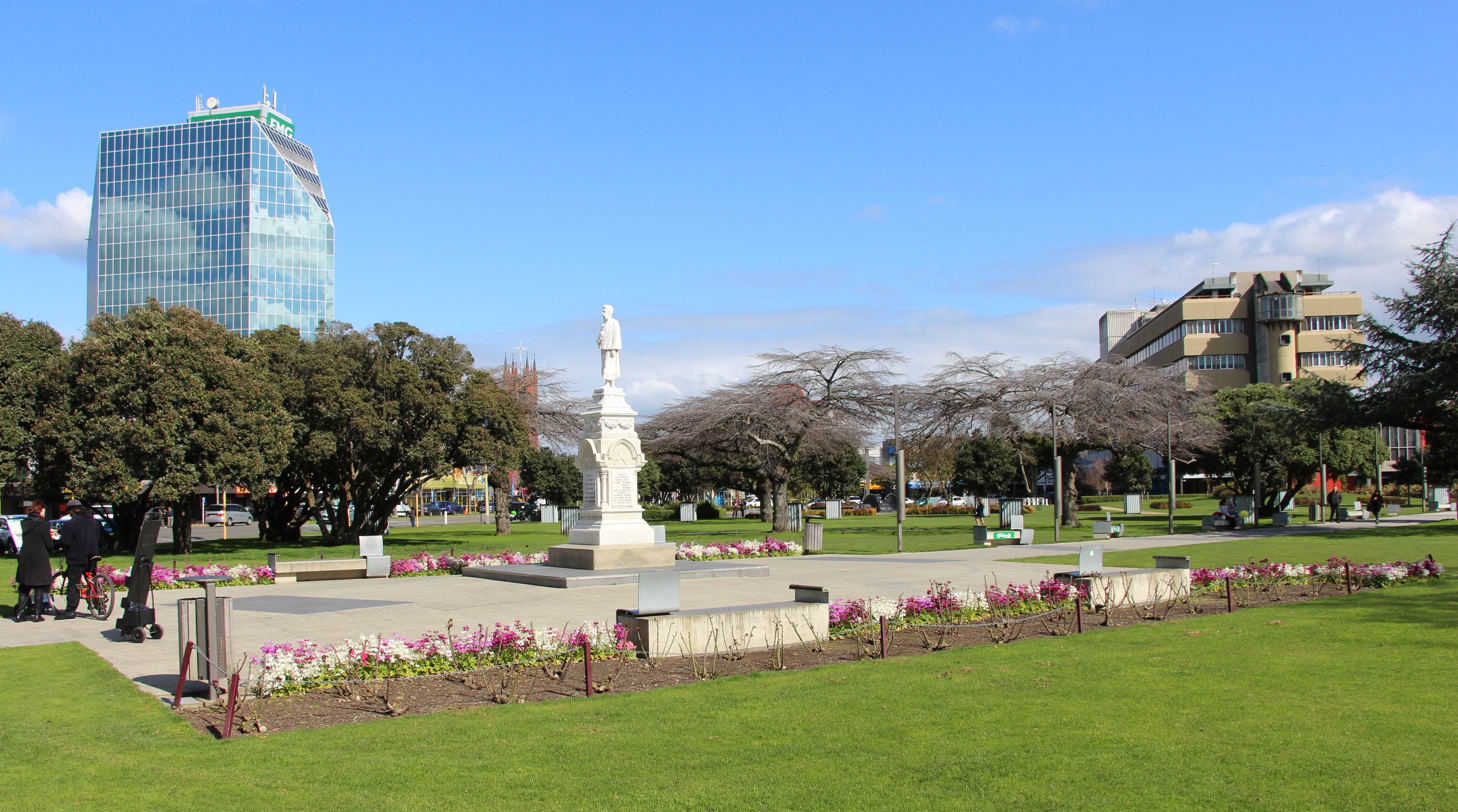
The Square

Palmerston North Central is the central suburb and central business district of Palmerston North, on New Zealand's North Island.

State Highway 3 passes through the area along Rangitikei Street, Main Street East, Grey Street and Princess Street.

== The Square ==
The CBD is centred around the Square, 17 hectares of land whose features include the Hopwood Clock Tower. Notable buildings and streets around the Square include the former Chief Post Office, which, as of 2025, is being renovated into a hotel and commercial centre, and the Square Building on the corner of Main Street East (which served as the old library to the city).

Further out around the Square are several shops and restaurants, shopping centres, the Palmerston North Library, the Regent on Broadway, Arena Manawatu and the Rugby Museum, Te Manawa (formerly Manawatu Science Museum and Art Gallery), and the Centrepoint Theatre.

High-rise buildings in the city include the Spark telecommunications building on Main Street East, FMG House (Palmerston North's tallest building) and the former State Insurance building. Palmerston North City Council has its buildings on the corner of the Square and Main Street West, including by the large Civic Building. Palmerston North Police have moved from their old building on Church Street to a new complex across the road.

The All Saints Anglican Church dominates the south-west sector of the Square, characterised by its red brick construction. The Catholic Cathedral of the Holy Spirit on Broadway Avenue is located east of the square.

== Demographics ==
Palmerston North Central covers 1.84 km^{2} (0.71 sq mi) and had an estimated population of 1,160 as of June 2025, with a population density of 630 people per km^{2}.

Historical population for Palmerston North Central
Year	Pop.	±% p.a.
2006	1,314	—
2013	1,218	−1.08%
2018	1,116	−1.73%
2023	1,074	−0.76%

Palmerston North Central had a population of 1,074 in the 2023 New Zealand census, a decrease of 42 people (−3.8%) since the 2018 census, and a decrease of 144 people (−11.8%) since the 2013 census. There were 528 males, 525 females, and 21 people of other genders in 408 dwellings. 9.2% of people identified as LGBTIQ+. The median age was 29.6 years (compared with 38.1 years nationally). There were 156 people (14.5%) aged under 15 years, 387 (36.0%) aged 15 to 29, 453 (42.2%) aged 30 to 64, and 78 (7.3%) aged 65 or older.

People could identify as more than one ethnicity. The results were 60.3% European (Pākehā); 25.1% Māori; 10.1% Pasifika; 19.0% Asian; 2.8% Middle Eastern, Latin American and African New Zealanders (MELAA); and 2.8% other, which includes people giving their ethnicity as "New Zealander". English was spoken by 94.7%, Māori by 6.1%, Samoan by 2.2%, and other languages by 19.3%. No language could be spoken by 2.5% (e.g. too young to talk). New Zealand Sign Language was known by 1.7%. The percentage of people born overseas was 29.6, compared with 28.8% nationally.

Religious affiliations were 27.9% Christian, 3.1% Hindu, 4.2% Islam, 1.4% Māori religious beliefs, 1.7% Buddhist, 0.8% New Age, and 3.1% other religions. People who answered that they had no religion were 50.8%, and 7.5% of people did not answer the census question.

Of those at least 15 years old, 198 (21.6%) people had a bachelor's or higher degree, 492 (53.6%) had a post-high school certificate or diploma, and 231 (25.2%) people exclusively held high school qualifications. The median income was $29,400, compared with $41,500 nationally. 33 people (3.6%) earned over $100,000 compared to 12.1% nationally. The employment status of those at least 15 was 429 (46.7%) full-time, 123 (13.4%) part-time, and 60 (6.5%) unemployed.

=== Tremaine ===
Tremaine is a commercial/industrial area north of the CBD, which includes Palmerston North railway station. It covers 4.25 km^{2} (1.64 sq mi) and had an estimated population of 450 as of June 2025, with a population density of 106 people per km^{2}.

Historical population for Tremaine
Year	Pop.	±% p.a.
2006	426	—
2013	384	−1.47%
2018	456	+3.50%
2023	429	−1.21%
The 2006 population is for a larger area of 4.40 km^{2}. Source:

Tremaine had a population of 429 in the 2023 New Zealand census, a decrease of 27 people (−5.9%) since the 2018 census, and an increase of 45 people (11.7%) since the 2013 census. There were 249 males, 174 females, and 6 people of other genders in 132 dwellings. 4.2% of people identified as LGBTIQ+. The median age was 28.8 years (compared with 38.1 years nationally). There were 84 people (19.6%) aged under 15 years, 138 (32.2%) aged 15 to 29, 168 (39.2%) aged 30 to 64, and 39 (9.1%) aged 65 or older.

People could identify as more than one ethnicity. The results were 68.5% European (Pākehā); 38.5% Māori; 10.5% Pasifika; 7.7% Asian; 0.7% Middle Eastern, Latin American and African New Zealanders (MELAA); and 4.2% other, which includes people giving their ethnicity as "New Zealander". English was spoken by 96.5%, Māori by 9.1%, Samoan by 0.7%, and other languages by 5.6%. No language could be spoken by 2.1% (e.g. too young to talk). New Zealand Sign Language was known by 1.4%. The percentage of people born overseas was 11.2, compared with 28.8% nationally.

Religious affiliations were 19.6% Christian, 1.4% Islam, 2.8% Māori religious beliefs, 1.4% Buddhist, 0.7% New Age, and 0.7% other religions. People who answered that they had no religion were 65.7%, and 7.7% of people did not answer the census question.

Of those at least 15 years old, 24 (7.0%) people had a bachelor's or higher degree, 195 (56.5%) had a post-high school certificate or diploma, and 126 (36.5%) people exclusively held high school qualifications. The median income was $31,300, compared with $41,500 nationally. 9 people (2.6%) earned over $100,000 compared to 12.1% nationally. The employment status of those at least 15 was 162 (47.0%) full-time, 48 (13.9%) part-time, and 24 (7.0%) unemployed.

== Economy ==
=== Retail ===
The Plaza shopping centre opened in 1986. It covers an area of 32,201 m², including 1,251 carparks and 103 shops. The mall's anchor tenants are Kmart, Farmers, Countdown and JB Hi-Fi.

Downtown Palmerston North also opened before the 1990s. It has 18 tenants, including Event Cinemas.

== Education ==
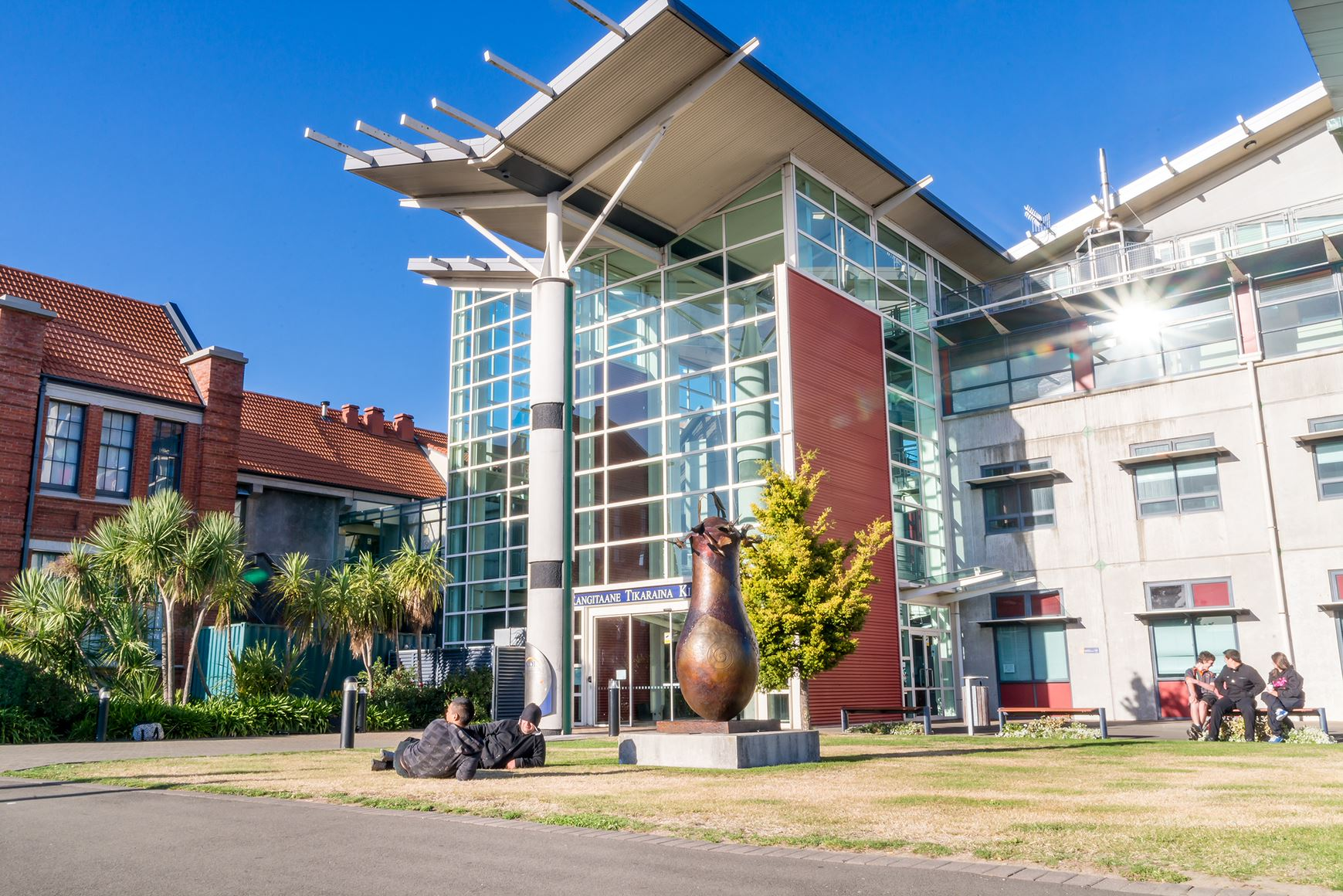
UCOL Palmerston North campus

The main Palmerston North campus of Universal College of Learning is located on the corner of King and Princess Streets. It has a red brick facade and atrium. The brick building was formerly Palmerston North Technical High School (now Queen Elizabeth College, Rangitikei Street) and Palmerston North Teachers' College.

Palmerston North Intermediate Normal School is a state intermediate school, with a roll of 749. It opened in 1941.

Carncot Independent School is a private primary school for Year 1 to 8 students, with a roll of 129. The school opened in 1903.

Mana Tamariki is a charter school for Year 1 to 13 students, located next to Aorangi Hospital. It has a roll of 68. It began as a kōhanga reo in 1989, became a private kura kaupapa Māori in 1995, and became partly state-funded in 2000.

Palmerston North Adventist Christian School is a state-integrated Christian primary school, with a roll of 100. It opened in 1936.

All these schools are co-educational. Rolls are as of July 2026.
