= St George's Street railway station =

Defunct train station in Auckland, New Zealand

St George's Street
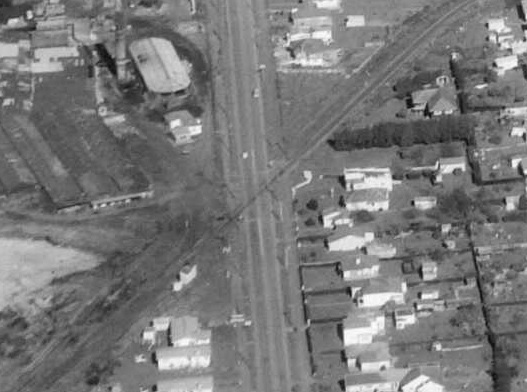
- Aerial view of St George's Street railway station in 1968 (bottom-left), near the intersection between Saint George's Road and the Western Line

History
- Opened: 1911
- Closed: 1980
Location

St George's Street railway station was a train station in Avondale, Auckland, New Zealand. It was on the Western Line and was adjacent to the St George's Road level crossing. Note the difference in the name of the station versus the road on which it was located.

The station was opened in November 1907. It was between New Lynn station and Avondale station. It closed at the same time as the Croydon Road and Westbrook stations, also on the Western Line, on a six-month trial basis on 18 August 1980, with the closure being made permanent on 16 August 1981. No trace of this station or its side platform remains today.

== See also ==
- List of Auckland railway stations
