= Hokowhitu Lagoon =

Lake in Palmerston North, New Zealand

- Centennial Lagoon
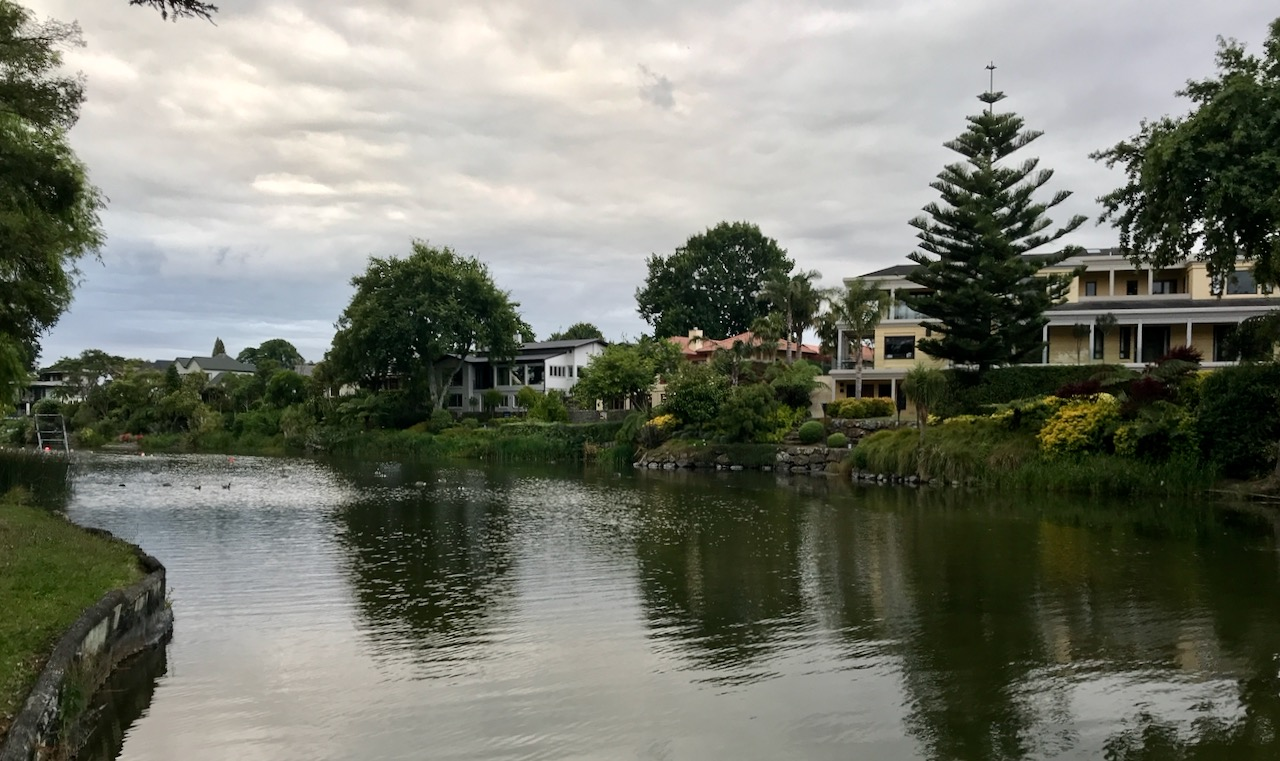
- Hokowhitu Lagoon

- Location of Hokowhitu Lagoon within the North Island
- Coordinates: 40°22′2.42″S 175°37′44.22″E
- Type: Oxbow lake
- Primary inflows: Artesian Bore
- Primary outflows: Earthquake-produced drainage from unknown source
- Catchment area: 2.7 km^{2} (1.0 sq mi)
- Max. length: ~1.06 km (0.66 mi)
- Max. width: ~70 m (230 ft)
- Average depth: 2.2 m (7.2 ft) (as of 2009)
- Settlements: Palmerston North

Hokowhitu Lagoon, also sometimes called Centennial Lagoon, is a natural oxbow lake in the city of Palmerston North, New Zealand. Hokowhitu was created from a meander of the Manawatū River. Many features surround the lagoon including a walkway, Caccia Birch House, and a former campus of a Massey University — the facilities of which are now used by the New Zealand Defence Force, Te Wānanga o Aotearoa and the Abbey Theatre Company. The lagoon also gives its name to the surrounding suburb, Hokowhitu.

An artesian bore, which was completed in 2009, is drilled 94 metres (308 ft) into an underground aquifer which supplies the lagoon with 250,000 litres of water daily.

== Features ==
Hokowhitu Lagoon is home to many water-life and birds. Perch is the most common fish in the lagoon, with 44 fish per 100m^{2}.

A 1.1 kilometres (0.68 mi) walk follows the shore of the lagoon and is popular with local leisure seekers. The walk includes a truss bridge which crosses the lagoon at roughly its halfway mark.

The Caccia Birch House, a Category I Historic location, sits on the northern side of the lagoon. The house was built in 1892 and was donated to the government in 1941.

== Diminishing water levels ==
During 2014 the lagoon's water levels dropped as the 2014 Eketāhuna earthquake opened up channels in the underside of the lake. The leaking continued and in December 2014 environmentally-safe dye was put into the water to help locate leaks. The Artesian Bore, which was built in 2009, cannot compete with the heavy leaking.

During mid-2016 a dive team was sent to investigate the lagoon bed to locate a source of the leaking.

== See also ==
- Hokowhitu
- Water in New Zealand
