= West Brook =

West Brook may refer to:

- West Brook, Nova Scotia, a community in Canada
- West Brook (West Branch Delaware River), in New York state
- West Brook High School, in Beaumont, Texas

== See also ==
- Westbrook (disambiguation)
