= West End, Palmerston North =

Suburb of Palmerston North

West End
- Suburb
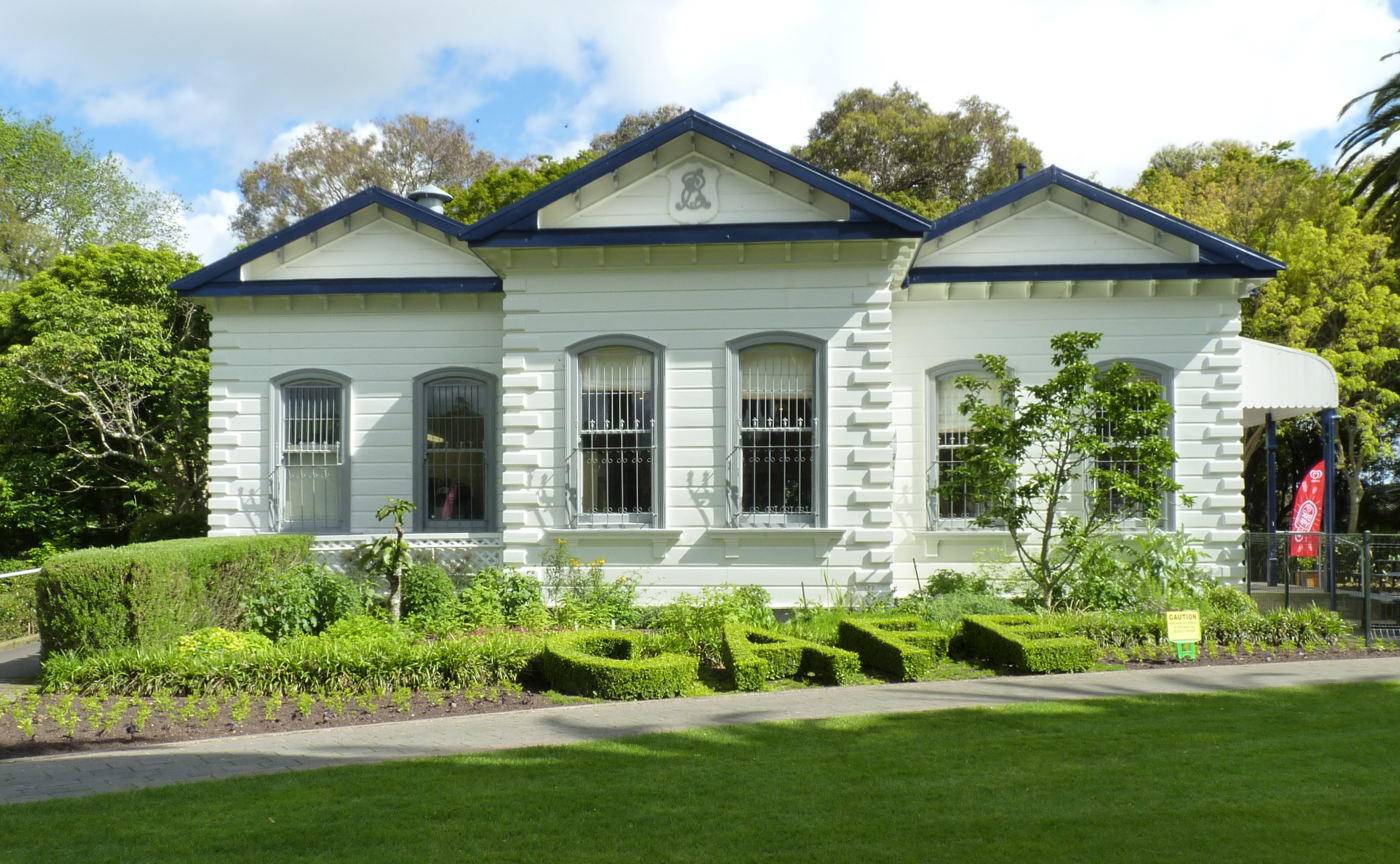
- Former post office, now a cafe in the Esplanade Reserve
- Interactive map of West End
- Coordinates: 40°22′00″S 175°36′30″E
- Country: New Zealand
- City: Palmerston North
- Local authority: Palmerston North City Council
- Electoral ward: Te Hirawanui General Ward; Te Pūao Māori Ward

Area
  - Land: 247 ha (610 acres)

Population (June 2025)
  - Total: 5,250
  - Density: 2,130/km^{2} (5,510/sq mi)
- Postcode(s): 4410, 4412

Takaro	Palmerston North Central
Highbury	West End	Hokowhitu
Awapuni

West End is a suburb of the New Zealand city of Palmerston North.

Features of the suburb include the Victoria Esplanade, Lido Swimming complex, Palmerston North Bowling Club, Palmerston North Holiday Park, Te Awe Awe Scout Group and Manawatu Lawn Tennis Centre. The local Fitzherbert Park is the city's main cricket and rugby league park. Other parks include Ongley Park, Manawaroa Park, West End Skate Park, State Highway 56 Reserve and Savage Reserve.

== Demographics ==
West End covers 2.47 km^{2} (0.95 sq mi) and had an estimated population of 5,250 as of June 2025, with a population density of 2,126 people per km^{2}.

Historical population
Year	Pop.	±% p.a.
2006	4,638	—
2013	4,713	+0.23%
2018	4,914	+0.84%
2023	4,959	+0.18%

West End had a population of 4,959 in the 2023 New Zealand census, an increase of 45 people (0.9%) since the 2018 census, and an increase of 246 people (5.2%) since the 2013 census. There were 2,373 males, 2,556 females, and 33 people of other genders in 1,971 dwellings. 5.4% of people identified as LGBTIQ+. The median age was 32.9 years (compared with 38.1 years nationally). There were 852 people (17.2%) aged under 15 years, 1,380 (27.8%) aged 15 to 29, 2,067 (41.7%) aged 30 to 64, and 660 (13.3%) aged 65 or older.

People could identify as more than one ethnicity. The results were 67.8% European (Pākehā); 21.1% Māori; 5.9% Pasifika; 20.4% Asian; 2.3% Middle Eastern, Latin American and African New Zealanders (MELAA); and 1.9% other, which includes people giving their ethnicity as "New Zealander". English was spoken by 95.0%, Māori by 5.4%, Samoan by 1.1%, and other languages by 18.3%. No language could be spoken by 2.2% (e.g. too young to talk). New Zealand Sign Language was known by 1.0%. The percentage of people born overseas was 28.6, compared with 28.8% nationally.

Religious affiliations were 28.2% Christian, 3.3% Hindu, 2.7% Islam, 1.4% Māori religious beliefs, 2.0% Buddhist, 0.6% New Age, 0.1% Jewish, and 1.8% other religions. People who answered that they had no religion were 52.9%, and 7.1% of people did not answer the census question.

Of those at least 15 years old, 1,221 (29.7%) people had a bachelor's or higher degree, 2,025 (49.3%) had a post-high school certificate or diploma, and 861 (21.0%) people exclusively held high school qualifications. The median income was $35,000, compared with $41,500 nationally. 306 people (7.5%) earned over $100,000 compared to 12.1% nationally. The employment status of those at least 15 was 2,010 (48.9%) full-time, 615 (15.0%) part-time, and 171 (4.2%) unemployed.

Individual statistical areas
Name	Area (km^{2})	Population	Density (per km^{2})	Dwellings	Median age	Median income
West End	1.16	2,892	2,493	1,164	32.7 years	$34,300
Esplanade	1.31	2,070	1,580	807	33.3 years	$36,000
New Zealand					38.1 years	$41,500

== Education ==
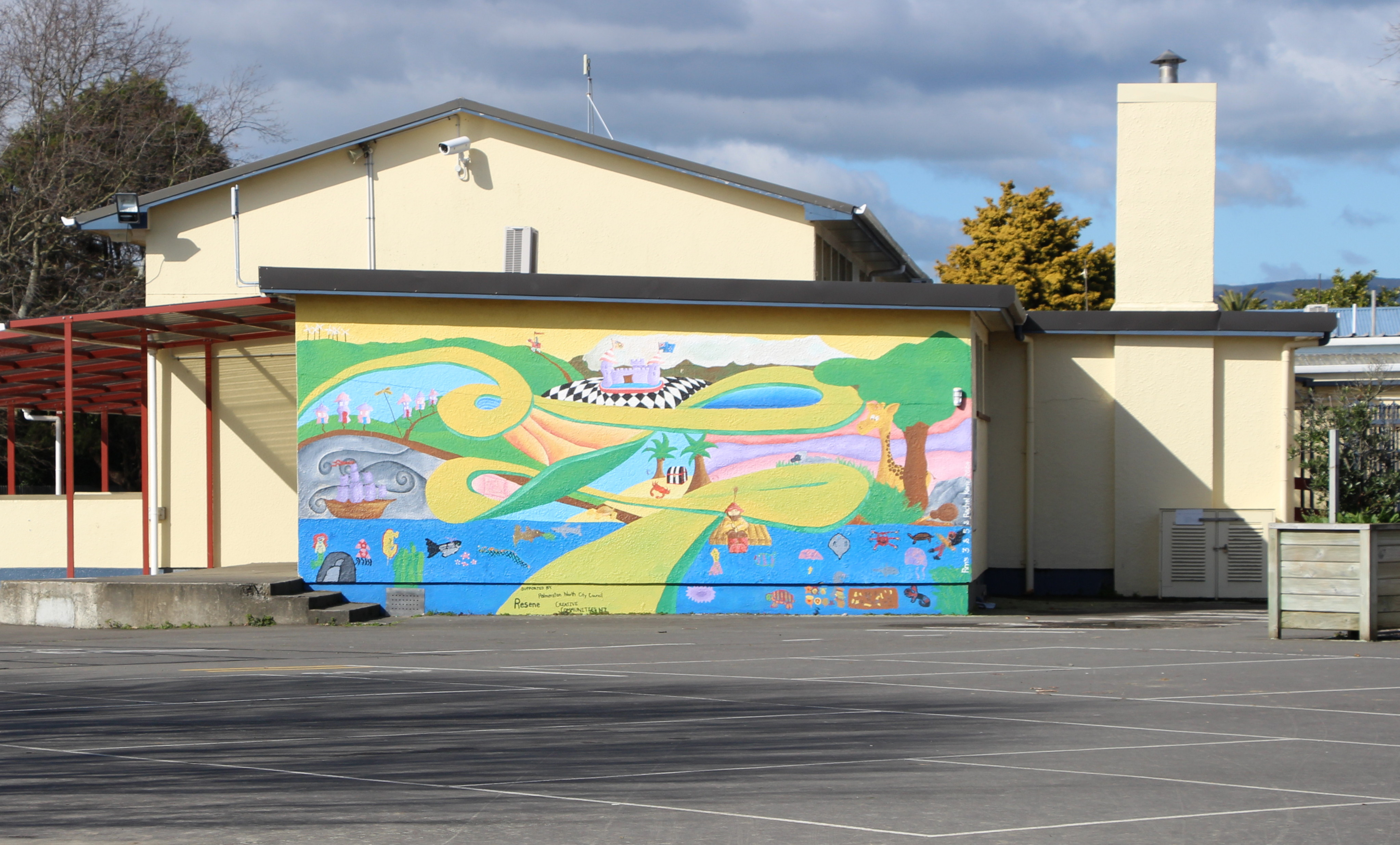
West End School

West End School is a co-educational state contributing primary school for Year 1 to 6 students, with a roll of 340 as of July 2025. It opened in 1913.

Students tend to travel to Monrad Intermediate for Year 7 and 8.

Palmerston North Girls' High School is a girls' state secondary school for Year 9 to 13, with a roll of 1314. Palmerston North High School (established 1902) split into separate schools for boys and girls in 1920.

== Transport ==
Palmerston North bus routes 102 and 108 (to/from the Main Street Bus Hub) and 122 (to/from Massey University) serve West End.
