= Hokowhitu =

Suburb of Palmerston North

- Suburb
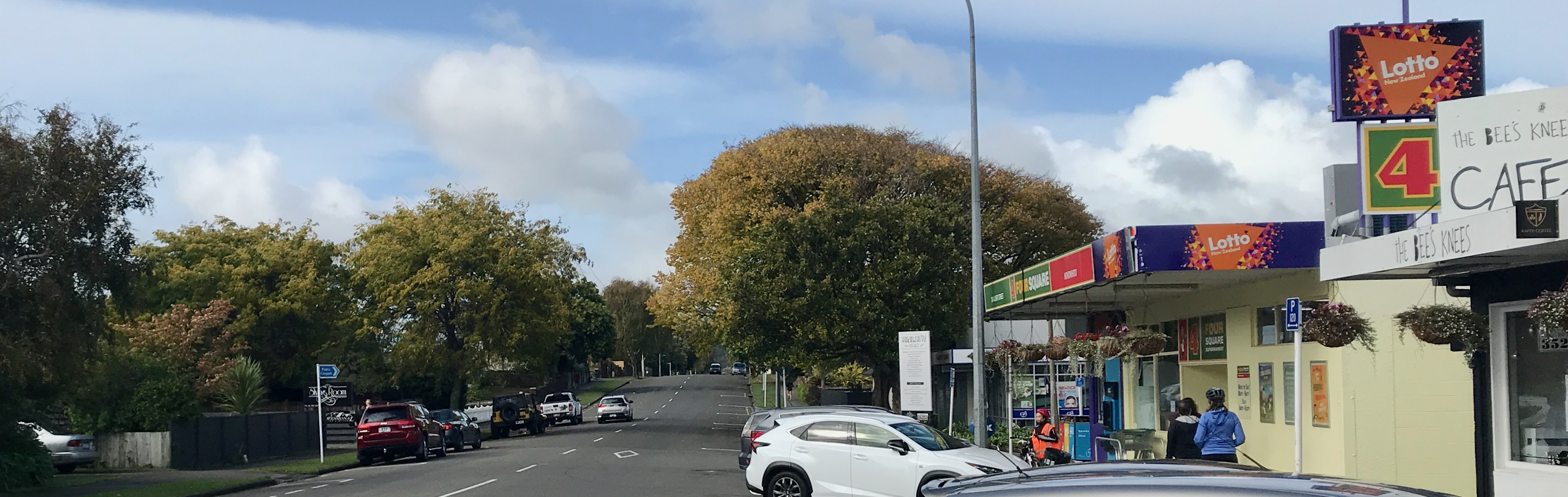
- Corner Te Awe Awe Street and Albert Street, Hokowhitu
- Interactive map of Hokowhitu
- Coordinates: 40°21′45″S 175°38′00″E
- Country: New Zealand
- City: Palmerston North
- Local authority: Palmerston North City Council
- Electoral ward: Te Hirawanui General Ward; Te Pūao Māori Ward

Area
  - Land: 528 ha (1,300 acres)

Population (June 2025)
  - Total: 11,580
  - Density: 2,190/km^{2} (5,680/sq mi)
- Postcode: 4410

Palmerston North Central	Terrace End
West End	Hokowhitu

Hokowhitu is a riverside suburb of the New Zealand city of Palmerston North, with some of the highest property values in the city.

The Hokowhitu Lagoon, Caccia Birch House, Jickell Street Reserve and Manawatu Golf Course are located next to the former education campus. Wallace Park, the home of the Ruahine Association Football Club and local cricket teams, is located nearby. Other local features include the Hokowhitu Domain, Crewe Crescent Reserve, Franklin Reserve, Fitzroy Bend Park, Milverton Park and playground, Awatea Reserve and stream, Hardie St Park and Centennial Drive Reserve.

Hokowhitu is part of the Palmerston North and Te Tai Hauāuru electorates.

Until 2013, it had its own ward councilors on the Palmerston North City Council.

== Demographics ==
Hokowhitu covers 5.28 km^{2} (2.04 sq mi) and had an estimated population of 11,580 as of June 2025, with a population density of 2,193 people per km^{2}.

Historical population
Year	Pop.	±% p.a.
2006	10,551	—
2013	10,638	+0.12%
2018	10,947	+0.57%
2023	11,097	+0.27%

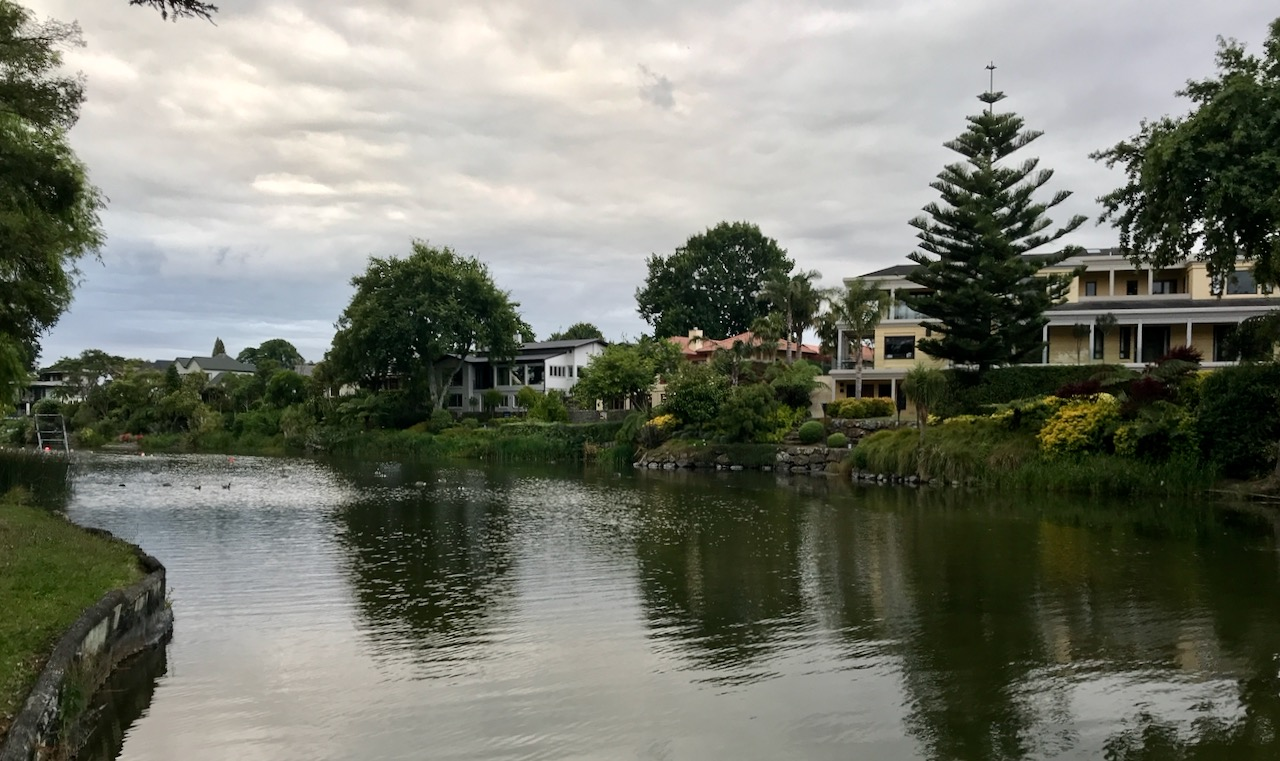
Hokowhitu Lagoon

Hokowhitu had a population of 11,097 in the 2023 New Zealand census, an increase of 150 people (1.4%) since the 2018 census, and an increase of 459 people (4.3%) since the 2013 census. There were 5,307 males, 5,730 females, and 63 people of other genders in 4,200 dwellings. 4.4% of people identified as LGBTIQ+. The median age was 38.0 years (compared with 38.1 years nationally). There were 1,980 people (17.8%) aged under 15 years, 2,490 (22.4%) aged 15 to 29, 4,671 (42.1%) aged 30 to 64, and 1,962 (17.7%) aged 65 or older.

People could identify as more than one ethnicity. The results were 75.9% European (Pākehā); 14.4% Māori; 4.2% Pasifika; 16.3% Asian; 2.1% Middle Eastern, Latin American and African New Zealanders (MELAA); and 2.2% other, which includes people giving their ethnicity as "New Zealander". English was spoken by 95.5%, Māori by 3.7%, Samoan by 0.3%, and other languages by 17.8%. No language could be spoken by 2.0% (e.g. too young to talk). New Zealand Sign Language was known by 0.5%. The percentage of people born overseas was 26.7, compared with 28.8% nationally.

Religious affiliations were 33.3% Christian, 2.4% Hindu, 1.8% Islam, 0.8% Māori religious beliefs, 1.3% Buddhist, 0.4% New Age, 0.1% Jewish, and 1.2% other religions. People who answered that they had no religion were 53.0%, and 6.0% of people did not answer the census question.

Of those at least 15 years old, 3,162 (34.7%) people had a bachelor's or higher degree, 4,431 (48.6%) had a post-high school certificate or diploma, and 1,524 (16.7%) people exclusively held high school qualifications. The median income was $43,500, compared with $41,500 nationally. 1,308 people (14.3%) earned over $100,000 compared to 12.1% nationally. The employment status of those at least 15 was 4,464 (49.0%) full-time, 1,419 (15.6%) part-time, and 246 (2.7%) unemployed.

Individual statistical areas
Name	Area (km^{2})	Population	Density (per km^{2})	Dwellings	Median age	Median income
Milverton	0.56	2,001	3,573	705	27.5 years	$29,700
Hokowhitu Central	0.91	2,340	2,571	939	45.0 years	$51,100
Hokowhitu East	1.24	3,156	2,545	1,188	37.6 years	$44,800
Ruahine	1.66	1,635	985	672	49.4 years	$51,400
Hokowhitu South	0.90	1,968	2,187	702	35.9 years	$40,800
New Zealand					38.1 years	$41,500

== Education ==
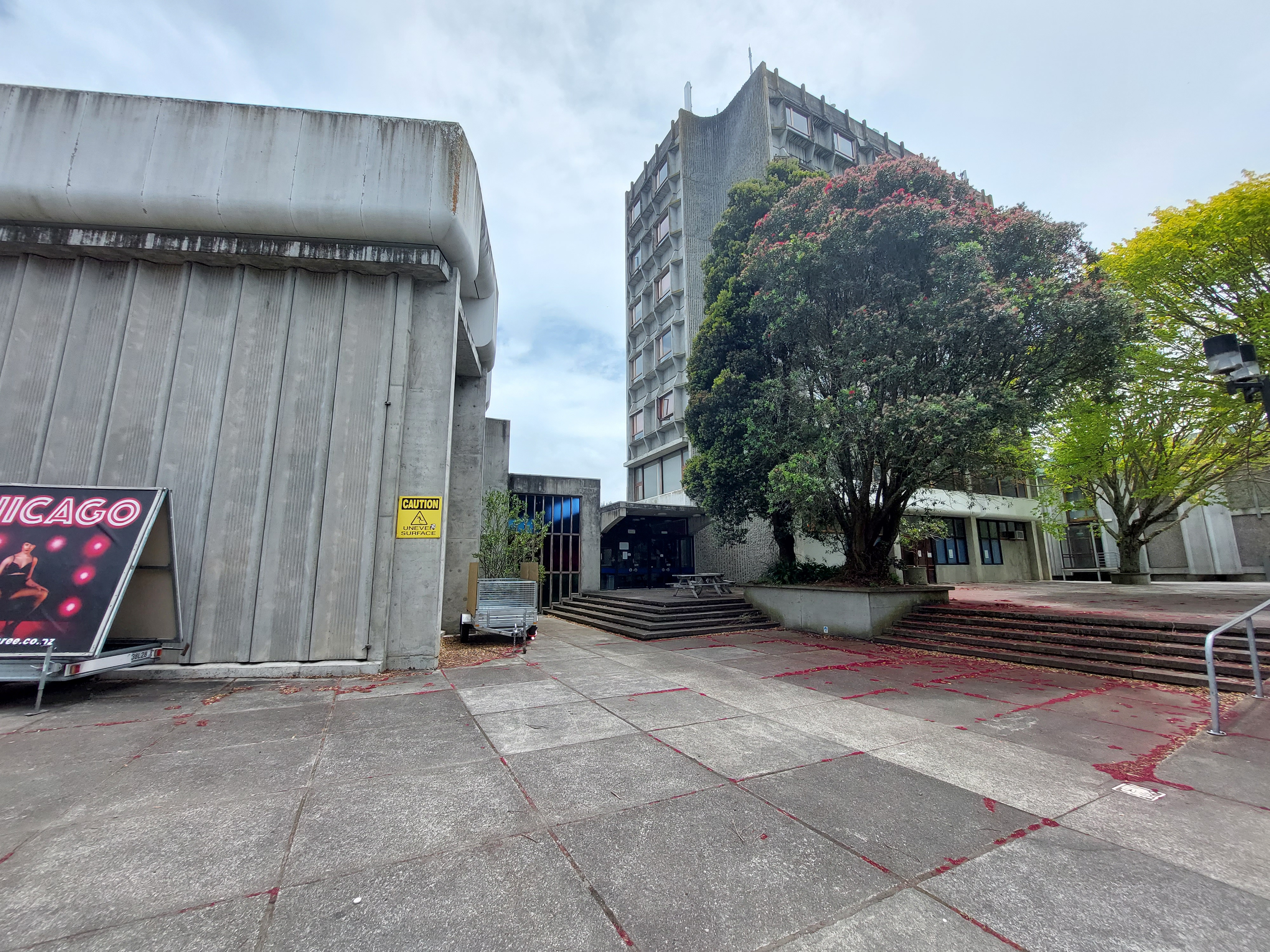
View of the former Palmerston North Teachers College campus in Hokowhitu

The former, shared campus of the Manawatū Polytechnic and Palmerston North Teachers' College exists next to Hokowhitu Lagoon. The campus begun construction in the early 1960s, with many of its buildings finished in the 1970s and early 1980s. The Polytech left the campus in 1995, and Massey University acquired the Teachers College in 1996. The New Zealand Defence Force began using some of the buildings in 2011.

Massey relocated the college to Turitea campus in 2013 and sold the land in 2016. When the site was sold, the land consisted of 20 buildings; including halls, offices, a library, a marae and sporting facilities. The site began to be redeveloped into housing in 2018.

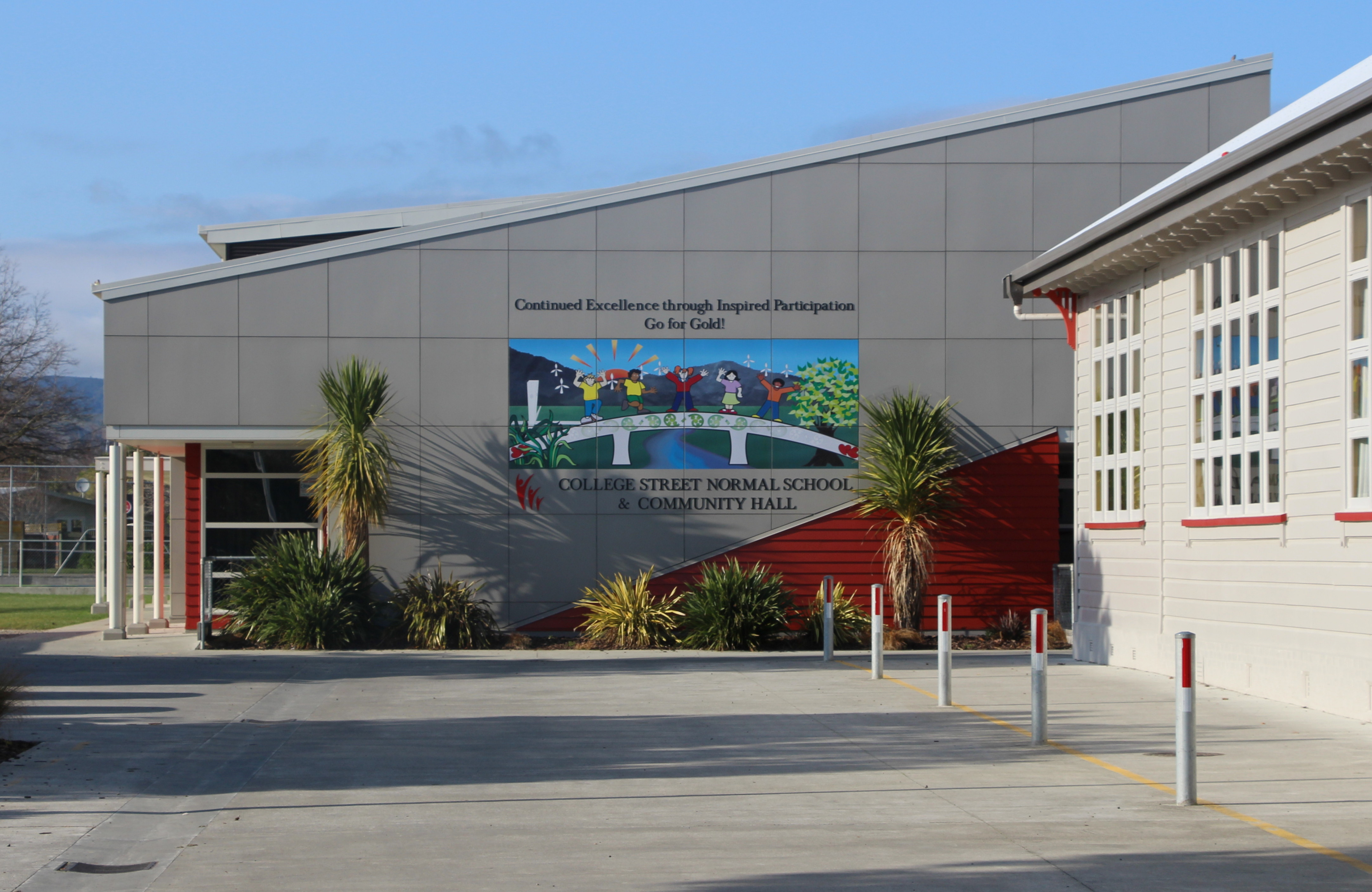
College Street Normal School

Hokowhitu has three contributing state primary schools for years 1 to 6: Hokowhitu School (established 1924) in the north, with a roll of 373; College Street Normal School (established 1893) in the west, with a roll of 604; and Winchester School (established 1958) in the east, with a roll of 324.

St James School, a state-integrated Catholic primary school for years 1 to 6 located just south of Hokowhitu School, has a roll of 154. It opened in 1958.

Manukura is a designated character school for Year 9 to 13 students. It was originally based on the old Massey University campus. It opened in 2005 as Tū Toa, and gained Special Character status in 2015.

All these schools are co-educational. Rolls are as of July 2025.

== Transport ==
Palmerston North bus routes 103 and 107 (to/from the Main Street Bus Hub) and 121 (to/from Massey University) serve Hokowhitu.
