= 2014 Eketāhuna earthquake =

Earthquake affecting North Island, New Zealand

- Location within New Zealand
- UTC time: 2014-01-20 02:52:44
- ISC event: 604055704
- USGS-ANSS: ComCat
- Local date: 20 January 2014
- Local time: 3:52 pm NZDT (UTC+13)
- Magnitude: 6.2 M_{L}
- Depth: 34 kilometres (21 mi)
- Epicentre: 40.62°S 175.86°E
- Type: Oblique-normal
- Areas affected: New Zealand
- Max. intensity: MMI VII (Very strong)
- Peak acceleration: 0.26 g
- Aftershocks: 1,112
- Casualties: 3 injured

The 2014 Eketāhuna earthquake struck at 3:52 pm on 20 January, centred 15 km east of Eketāhuna in the south-east of New Zealand's North Island. It had a maximum perceived intensity of VII (Very strong) on the Mercalli intensity scale. The magnitude 6.2 earthquake was followed by a total of 1,112 recorded aftershocks, ranging between magnitudes 2.0 and 4.9.

== Tectonic setting ==
New Zealand lies along the boundary between the Indo-Australian plate and Pacific plates. In the South Island most of the relative displacement between these plates is taken up along a single dextral (right lateral) strike-slip fault with a major reverse component, the Alpine Fault. In the North Island the displacement is mainly taken up along the Hikurangi Subduction Zone, although the remaining dextral strike-slip component of the relative plate motion is accommodated by the North Island Fault System (NIFS).

The focal mechanism of the earthquake, its depth and the distribution of aftershocks show that it was a result of oblique normal faulting within the upper part of the subducting Pacific plate, with the rupture terminating upwards at the plate interface.

== Earthquake ==
Originally reported as magnitude 6.6 on the Richter scale, the earthquake was later downgraded to a magnitude of 6.2. A total of 1112 aftershocks were recorded, ranging between magnitudes 2.0 and 4.9. A peak ground acceleration of 0.26 g was recorded at Woodville, with 0.2 g being recorded in Paraparaumu and under 0.05 g being recorded in Wellington city.

== Damage and effects ==
It was felt strongly down the country, from Auckland in the north to Dunedin in the south, and more than 9,000 reports were submitted by the public to GeoNet, the geological hazards monitoring network. The earthquake caused damage to walls and chimneys, cracks in roads to form, rockfall to occur at cliffs, power outages to about 5,600 homes and the giant hanging eagle in Wellington Airport to fall to the ground. Telecom experienced an overloaded network and Vodafone had an outage in Feilding. Roads were closed in the lower North Island, and freight and commuter rail was stopped. On the day after the earthquake, all state highways were open and rail services returned.

The Earthquake Commission, (EQC) received 5,013 claims, 1,514 of them from Palmerston North. Minor to moderate damage was also reported in Eketāhuna, Wellington, Masterton, Carterton, Kāpiti Coast, Pahiatua, Levin and Ōtaki. Three 1920s-style buildings in Masterton were evacuated after cracks appeared. One building needed to be demolished. According to The New Zealand Herald, two people were injured as a result of falls. In Palmerston North two drums containing chemicals fell over and broke, causing the chemicals to mix and resulted in three people being hospitalised.

Hokowhitu Lagoon in Palmerston North is thought to have suffered water-bed damage leading to water leaking. Currently no fix is in place to solve this. Thousands of people online, including the Palmerston North City Council, shared a picture of road damage that was claimed as being a road going towards Pongaroa, but it was instead a picture from the 1959 Yellowstone earthquake.

== See also ==
- List of earthquakes in 2014
- List of earthquakes in New Zealand
