= Takaro =

Suburb of Palmerston North

- Suburb
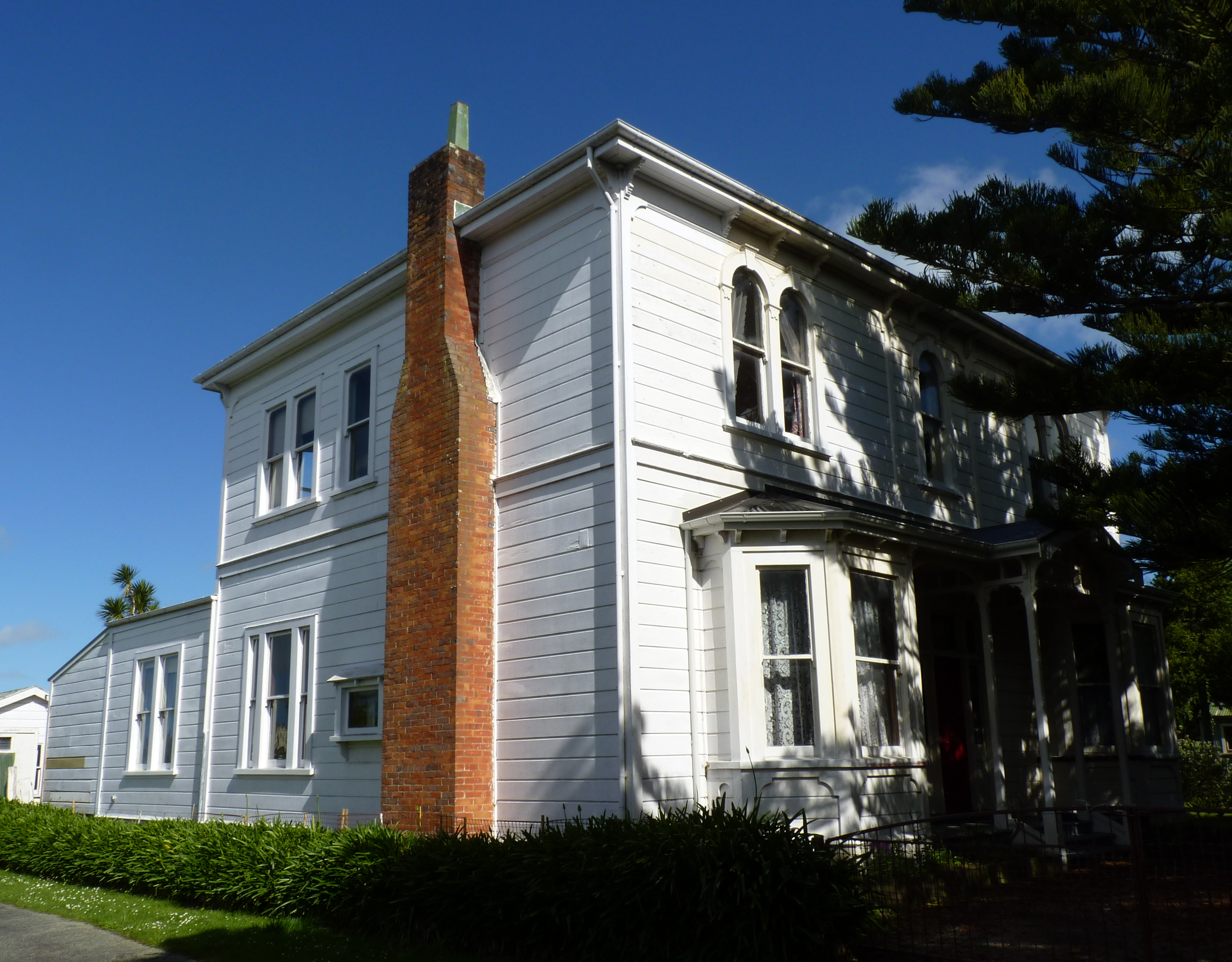
- The former Guy Homestead at 16 Guy Avenue
- Interactive map of Takaro
- Coordinates: 40.352°S 175.593°E
- Country: New Zealand
- City: Palmerston North
- Local authority: Palmerston North City Council
- Electoral ward: Te Hirawanui General Ward; Te Pūao Māori Ward

Area
  - Land: 200 ha (490 acres)

Population (June 2025)
  - Total: 5,960
  - Density: 3,000/km^{2} (7,700/sq mi)

Cloverlea		Milson
Westbrook, Highbury	Takaro	Papaioea
Awapuni	West End	Palmerston North Central

Takaro is a suburb and constituent ward of Palmerston North, Manawatū-Whanganui, New Zealand.

It is located east of Highbury, west of Palmerston North Hospital Area and north of the CBD. It had a resident population of 5,253 in 2013, making up 6.6% of Palmerston North's population.

The area includes Takaro Park, Kawau Stream Reserve, Clausen Reserve, Gloucester Reserve, Coronation Park, Takaro Bowling Club, Takaro Tennis Club, Masonic Court, Rose A Lea Retirement Home and Palmerston Manor Retirement Home.

== Demographics ==
Takaro covers 2.00 km^{2} (0.77 sq mi) and had an estimated population of 5,960 as of June 2025, with a population density of 2,980 people per km^{2}.

Historical population
Year	Pop.	±% p.a.
2006	5,631	—
2013	5,571	−0.15%
2018	5,748	+0.63%
2023	5,781	+0.11%

Takaro had a population of 5,781 in the 2023 New Zealand census, an increase of 33 people (0.6%) since the 2018 census, and an increase of 210 people (3.8%) since the 2013 census. There were 2,847 males, 2,880 females, and 54 people of other genders in 2,208 dwellings. 5.6% of people identified as LGBTIQ+. The median age was 32.9 years (compared with 38.1 years nationally). There were 1,095 people (18.9%) aged under 15 years, 1,482 (25.6%) aged 15 to 29, 2,490 (43.1%) aged 30 to 64, and 714 (12.4%) aged 65 or older.

People could identify as more than one ethnicity. The results were 74.2% European (Pākehā); 25.4% Māori; 8.1% Pasifika; 11.6% Asian; 1.1% Middle Eastern, Latin American and African New Zealanders (MELAA); and 1.7% other, which includes people giving their ethnicity as "New Zealander". English was spoken by 95.5%, Māori by 6.3%, Samoan by 1.3%, and other languages by 11.6%. No language could be spoken by 2.2% (e.g. too young to talk). New Zealand Sign Language was known by 0.8%. The percentage of people born overseas was 17.8, compared with 28.8% nationally.

Religious affiliations were 26.2% Christian, 1.8% Hindu, 1.7% Islam, 1.7% Māori religious beliefs, 1.2% Buddhist, 0.7% New Age, 0.1% Jewish, and 2.2% other religions. People who answered that they had no religion were 57.0%, and 7.7% of people did not answer the census question.

Of those at least 15 years old, 1,065 (22.7%) people had a bachelor's or higher degree, 2,643 (56.4%) had a post-high school certificate or diploma, and 969 (20.7%) people exclusively held high school qualifications. The median income was $41,600, compared with $41,500 nationally. 276 people (5.9%) earned over $100,000 compared to 12.1% nationally. The employment status of those at least 15 was 2,562 (54.7%) full-time, 591 (12.6%) part-time, and 168 (3.6%) unemployed.

Individual statistical areas
Name	Area (km^{2})	Population	Density (per km^{2})	Dwellings	Median age	Median income
Takaro North	1.12	3,321	2,965	1,266	32.8 years	$41,700
Takaro South	0.88	2,460	2,795	939	33.0 years	$41,500
New Zealand					38.1 years	$41,500

== Education ==
Palmerston North Boys' High School is a single-sex state secondary school for years 9 to 13. It has a roll of 1,854. Palmerston North High School was established in 1902, and split into separate schools for boys and girls in 1920, with the boys' school staying on the original site.

Queen Elizabeth College is a state secondary school for years 7 to 13. It has a roll of 455. It opened in 1906, and expanded to include a junior school for years 7 and 8 in 2024.

Takaro School is a state primary school, with a roll of 192. It opened in 1957.

Our Lady of Lourdes School is a state-integrated Catholic primary school, with a roll of 144. It opened in 1951.

All these schools apart from Palmerston North Boys' School are co-educational. Rolls are as of March 2026,
