= Awapuni, Palmerston North =

Suburb of Palmerston North

Awapuni
- Suburb
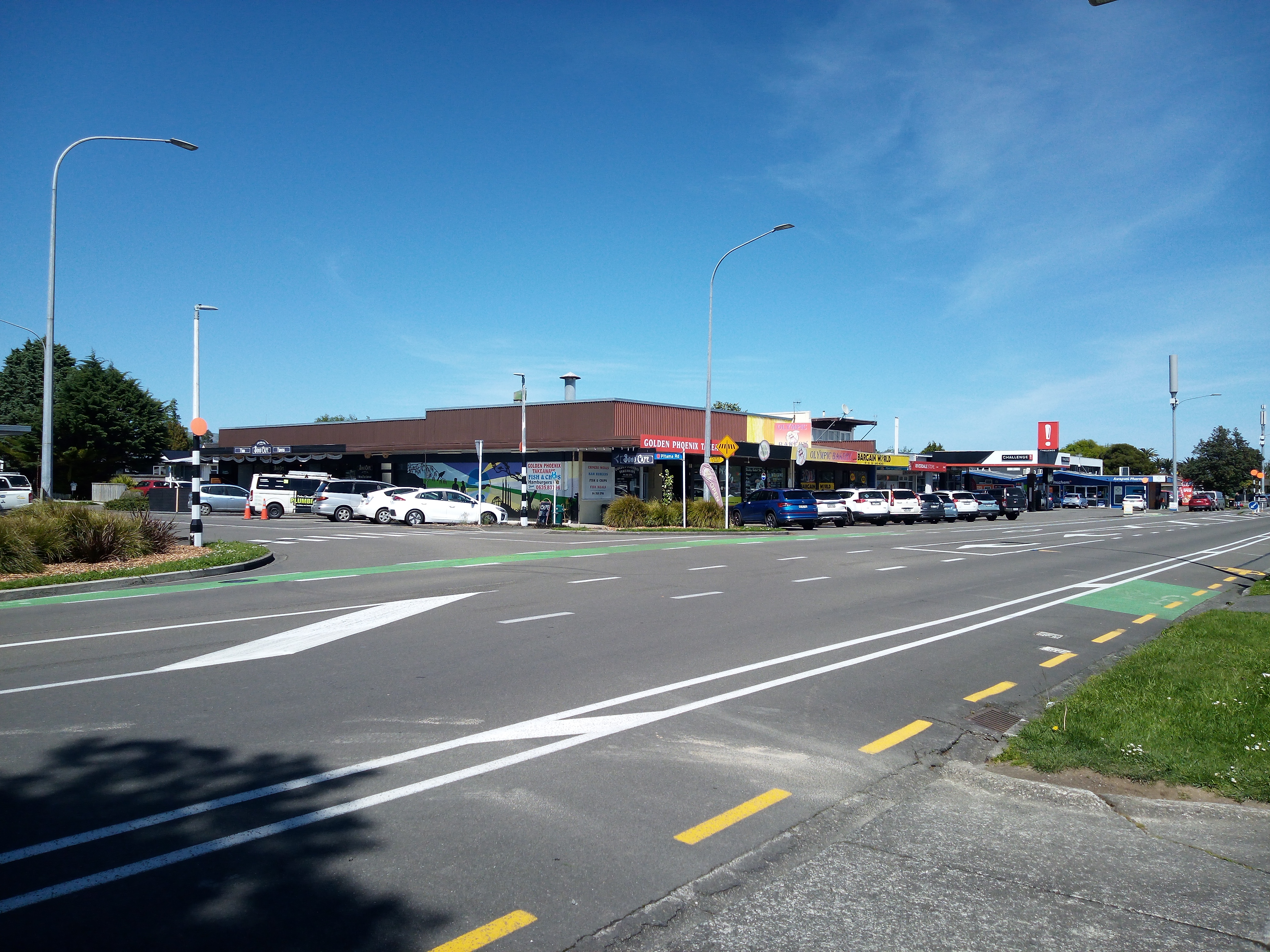
- The Awapuni shopping centre
- Interactive map of Awapuni
- Coordinates: 40.3791°S 175.5844°E
- Country: New Zealand
- City: Palmerston North
- Local authority: Palmerston North City Council
- Electoral ward: Te Hirawanui General Ward; Te Pūao Māori Ward

Area
  - Land: 535 ha (1,320 acres)

Population (June 2025)
  - Total: 8,910
  - Density: 1,670/km^{2} (4,310/sq mi)

	Highbury	Takaro
Longburn	Awapuni	West End
	Linton Camp	Massey University

Awapuni is a suburb of Palmerston North, Manawatū-Whanganui, New Zealand. It is located south west of Palmerston North Central. The New Zealand Ministry for Culture and Heritage gives a translation of "blocked-up river" for Awapuni. A memorial to the New Zealand Army Medical Corps is located at the Awapuni Racecourse.

Te Hotu Manawa Marae and its Tūturu Pumau meeting house are located in Awapuni. It is a tribal meeting ground for the Rangitāne hapū of Ngāti Kapuārangi, Ngāti Rangiaranaki, Ngāti Rangitepaia, Ngāti Hineaute and Ngāti Tauira.

== Demographics ==
Awapuni covers 5.35 km^{2} (2.07 sq mi) and had an estimated population of 8,910 as of June 2025, with a population density of 1,665 people per km^{2}.

Historical population
Year	Pop.	±% p.a.
2006	7,947	—
2013	7,845	−0.18%
2018	8,295	+1.12%
2023	8,550	+0.61%

Awapuni had a population of 8,550 in the 2023 New Zealand census, an increase of 255 people (3.1%) since the 2018 census, and an increase of 705 people (9.0%) since the 2013 census. There were 4,074 males, 4,437 females, and 42 people of other genders in 3,048 dwellings. 4.4% of people identified as LGBTIQ+. The median age was 34.6 years (compared with 38.1 years nationally). There were 1,749 people (20.5%) aged under 15 years, 1,908 (22.3%) aged 15 to 29, 3,603 (42.1%) aged 30 to 64, and 1,287 (15.1%) aged 65 or older.

People could identify as more than one ethnicity. The results were 73.8% European (Pākehā); 22.1% Māori; 7.2% Pasifika; 13.4% Asian; 1.9% Middle Eastern, Latin American and African New Zealanders (MELAA); and 2.4% other, which includes people giving their ethnicity as "New Zealander". English was spoken by 95.7%, Māori by 5.6%, Samoan by 1.4%, and other languages by 13.7%. No language could be spoken by 2.3% (e.g. too young to talk). New Zealand Sign Language was known by 0.8%. The percentage of people born overseas was 21.0, compared with 28.8% nationally.

Religious affiliations were 30.6% Christian, 1.8% Hindu, 1.8% Islam, 1.4% Māori religious beliefs, 1.0% Buddhist, 0.4% New Age, 0.1% Jewish, and 1.4% other religions. People who answered that they had no religion were 54.6%, and 7.1% of people did not answer the census question.

Of those at least 15 years old, 1,734 (25.5%) people had a bachelor's or higher degree, 3,567 (52.4%) had a post-high school certificate or diploma, and 1,497 (22.0%) people exclusively held high school qualifications. The median income was $40,800, compared with $41,500 nationally. 534 people (7.9%) earned over $100,000 compared to 12.1% nationally. The employment status of those at least 15 was 3,516 (51.7%) full-time, 945 (13.9%) part-time, and 207 (3.0%) unemployed.

Individual statistical areas
Name	Area (km^{2})	Population	Density (per km^{2})	Dwellings	Median age	Median income
Awapuni North	1.23	3,684	2,995	1,284	31.0 years	$37,700
Maraetarata	2.44	1,464	600	540	39.7 years	$45,900
Awapuni South	1.67	3,399	2,035	1,224	37.4 years	$42,900
New Zealand					38.1 years	$41,500

== Suburbs ==
=== Awapuni North ===
Awapuni North features Awapuni School and Kia Toa Sports Club rooms. It is also the location of Awapuni and Alexander Parks, and Rugby, Panako and Raleigh Reserves.

College Street divides Awapuni North from Awapuni South.

=== Awapuni South ===
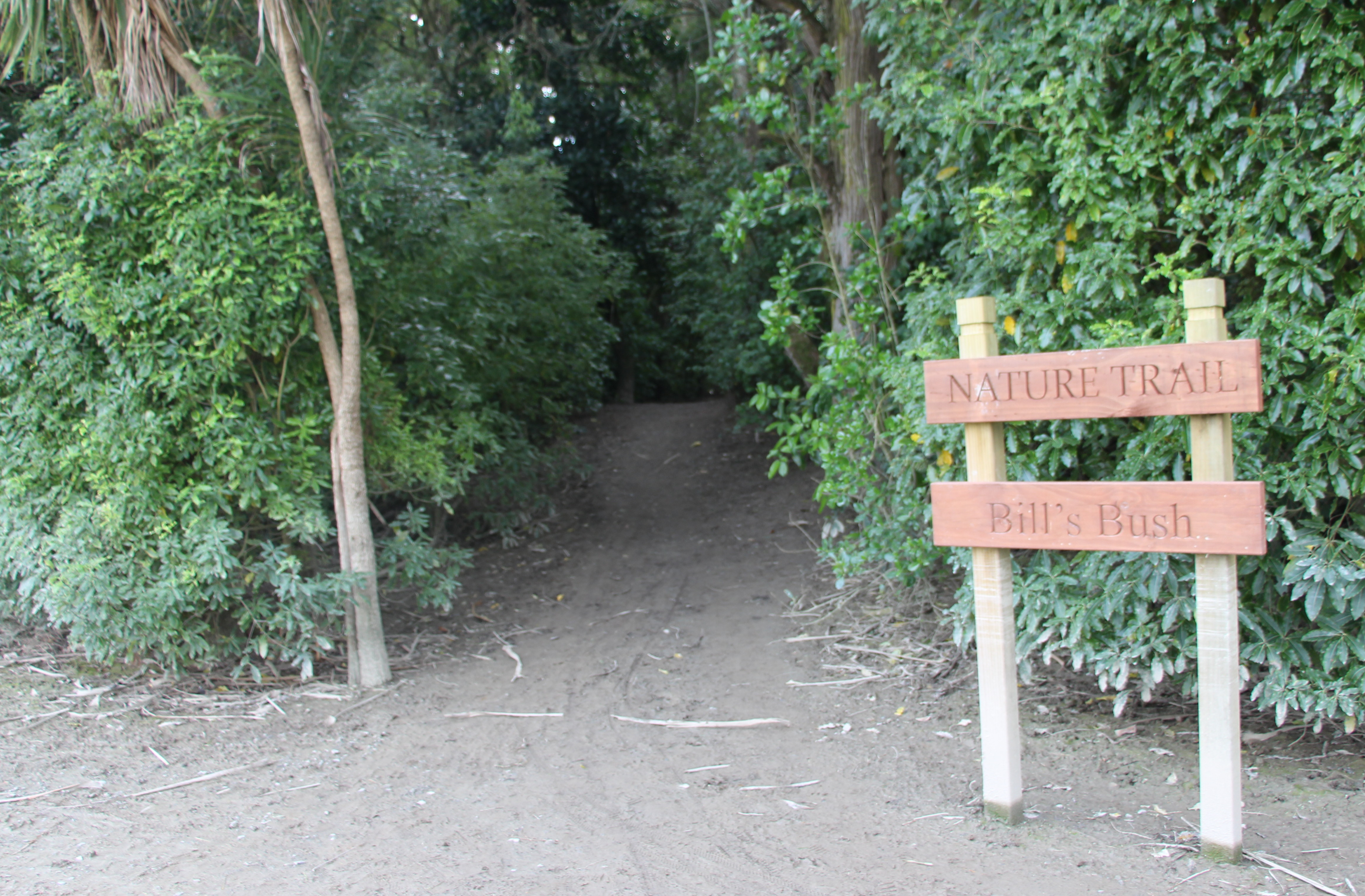
Bill's Bush in Ahimate Reserve

Awapuni South contains Riverdale School and Awapuni School, Awatapu College and a chapel of the Church of Jesus Christ of Latter-day Saints. It features Riverdale, Ahimate and Paneiri Parks; the riverside Dittmer Drive Reserve includes a stopbank and walking track.

The area College Street divides Awapuni North from Awapuni South. The suburb is bounded by the Manawatu River. Dittmer Drive (which runs the bank of the river) has a stopbank, which is the first defence if there is a chance of flooding. There are many large houses along Dittmer Drive.

=== Maraetarata ===
Maraetarata, previously called Awapuni West, is centred around Awapuni Racecourse. It features Rangitaane, Mangaone, Otira and Totaranui parks.

Maxwells Line divides Maraetarata from Awapuni North and Awapuni South. The Mangaone Stream mostly forms the western boundary. Other features of Maraetarata include the Awapuni Landfill. Maraetarata is the site of the ancient Awapuni Lagoon, upon which the racecourse is now situated.

== Awapuni Racecourse ==
Awapuni is known nationally for having the Awapuni Racecourse, the racing centre for thoroughbred horses (gallopers) in the Manawatu region. The Awapuni Racecourse holds a number of nationally significant races, including the:

- Manawatu Sires Produce Stakes which is a Group One race (the highest level) for 2 year olds run over 1400m in late March or early April. This race is arguably New Zealand's best race for 2 year old horses.
- Awapuni Gold Cup, an open class Group Two race over 2000m also raced in late March or early April, which has been won by some of New Zealand's greatest horses such as the Japan Cup winner Horlicks, and Balmerino.
- Manawatu Classic, a Group Three event over 2000m for 3 year olds.
- Manawatu Breeders Stakes, a Group Three Weight-for-age event over 2000m in April.
- Merial Metric Mile, an open class Group Three event in mid September.
- Eulogy Stakes, a Group Three event for 3 year old fillies over 1550min mid December.
- Manawatu Challenge Stakes, a Group Two Weight-for-age event over 1400m, in late December.
- Manawatu Cup, a Group Three open class event over 2100m in late December.

In the past there were a number of race tracks in the region, such as Feilding and Marton, which have been closed and some of those Club's key races are now held at the Awapuni Racecourse, thereby preserving their history such as the:

- Feilding Gold Cup, a Listed race (the 4th tier) for open class horses over 2100m in early November.
- Marton Cup, a Listed race for open class horses over 2100m in early January.
- Rangitikei Gold Cup, a Listed race for open class horses over 1550m in May.

The Awapuni Racecourse has a large function centre and is a racehorse training centre used by a number of prominent horse trainers.

== Medical Corps memorial ==
During WWI the Awapuni Racecourse was used as a training site by the New Zealand Medical Corps for medical personnel who were deployed to hospital ships and battlefields. In 1929 a memorial to honour medics killed in the war was unveiled by the Governor General Sir Charles Fergusson. The memorial takes the form of a five metre high stone cairn fountain made of Nelson marble which stands in a 'lake' in the shape of a cross. It is thought that it is the only memorial in the country dedicated to military medics and has a Heritage New Zealand Category I listing (registration number 9684). The memorial fell into disrepair but was restored and rededicated at a ceremony in 2016.

== Education ==
Awapuni School is a state contributing primary school for Year 1 to 6 students with a roll of 90. The school opened in 1958.

Riverdale School is a state contributing primary school for Year 1 to 6 students, with a roll of 340.

Awatapu College is a state secondary school for Year 9 to 13 students, with a roll of 922. It opened in 1976.

All these schools are co-educational. Rolls are as of March 2026.

== Transport ==
Palmerston North bus routes 102, 106 and 108 serve Awapuni.

== See also ==
Awapuni railway station
