= Croydon Road railway station =

Defunct railway station in Auckland, New Zealand

Croydon Road
- Croydon Road railway station in 1959

History
- Opened: 1911
- Closed: 1980
Location

Croydon Road railway station was a train station in Auckland, New Zealand. It opened circa December 1911. It was on the Western Line and was between Fruitvale Road station and Glen Eden station. The station closed at the same time as the St George's Street and Westbrook stations, also on the Western Line, on a six-month trial basis on 18 August 1980, with the closure being made permanent on 16 August 1981.

== See also ==
- Western Line (Auckland)
- List of Auckland railway stations
