= Westbrook railway station, Auckland =

Defunct railway station in New Zealand

Westbrook
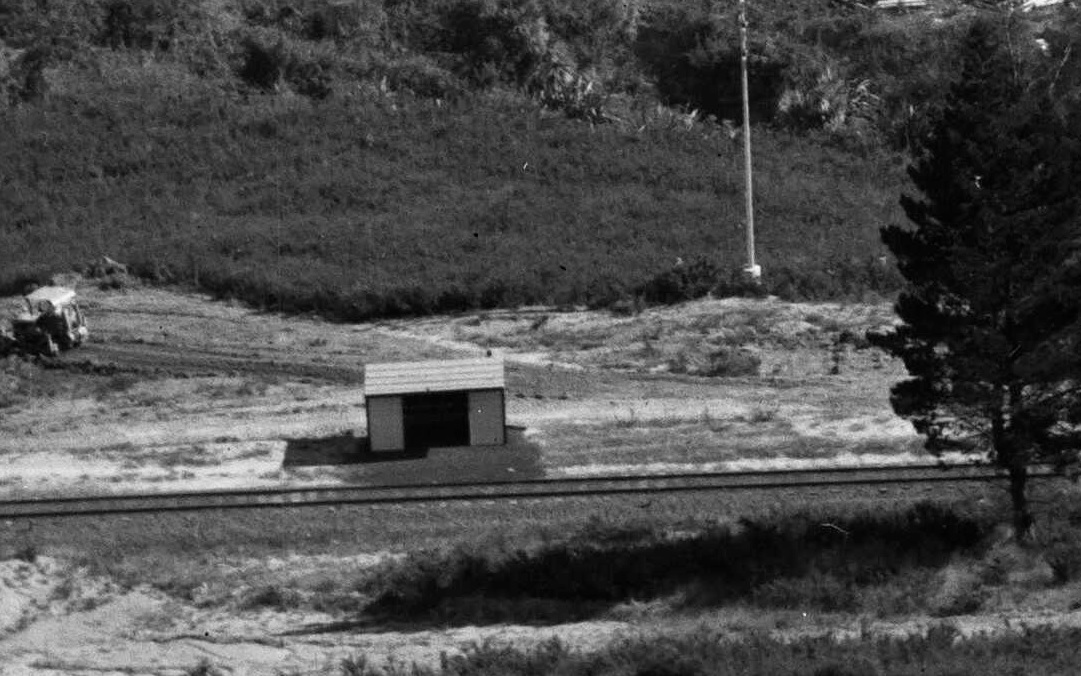
- Westbrook railway station in 1959

History
- Opened: 1957
- Closed: 1980
Location

Westbrook railway station was a station on the Western Line in Auckland, New Zealand, between Waikomiti station and Glen Eden station. It was opened on 6 September 1957. It was closed at the same time as the Croydon Road and St George's Street stations, also on the Western Line, on a six-month trial basis on 18 August 1980, with the closure being made permanent on 16 August 1981.

== See also ==
- List of Auckland railway stations
