= Highbury, Palmerston North =

Suburb of Palmerston North

Highbury
- Suburb
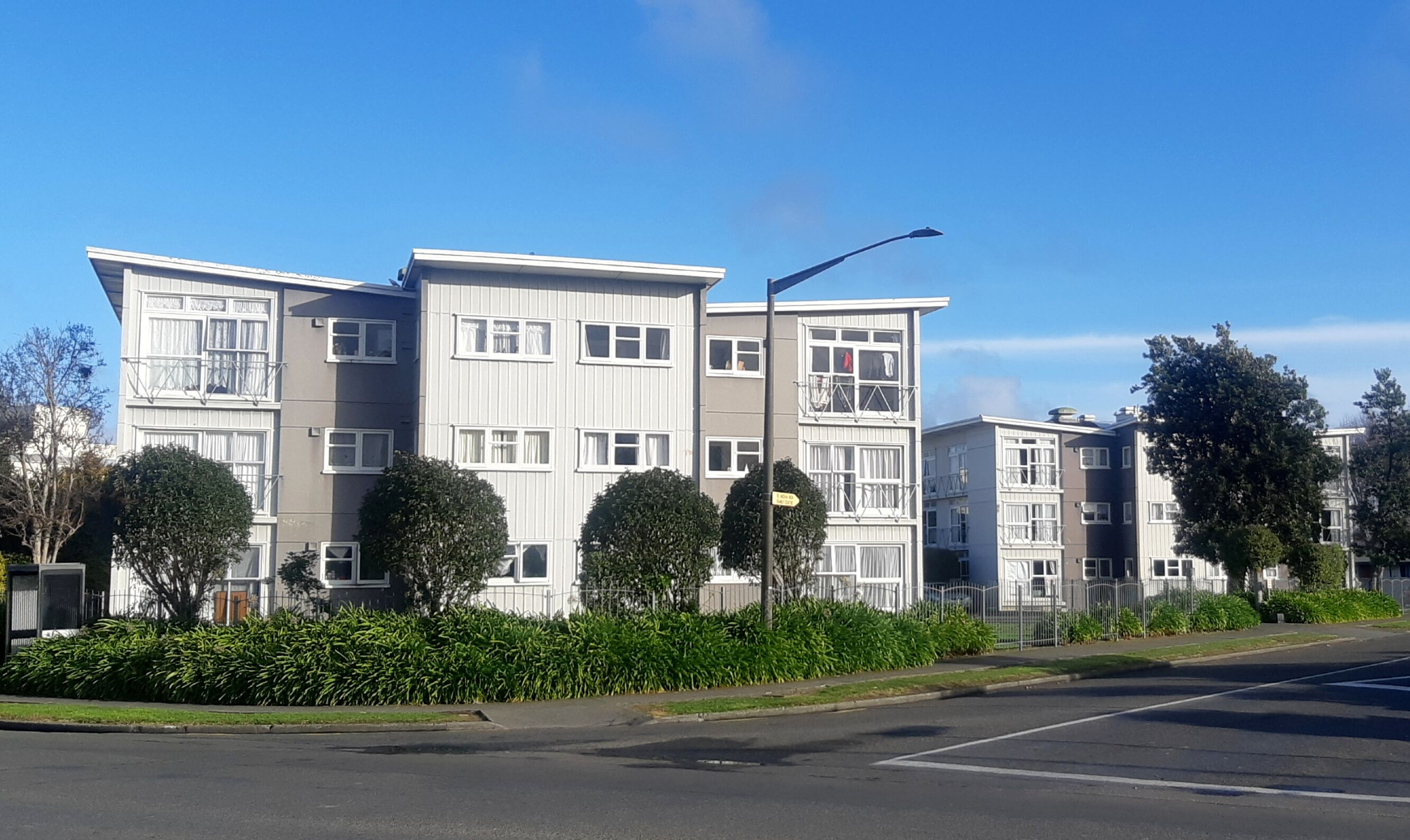
- Star Flats state apartments
- Interactive map of Highbury
- Coordinates: 40.365°S 175.583°E
- Country: New Zealand
- City: Palmerston North
- Local authority: Palmerston North City Council
- Electoral ward: Te Hirawanui General Ward; Te Pūao Māori Ward

Area
  - Land: 209 ha (520 acres)

Population (June 2025)
  - Total: 4,810
  - Density: 2,300/km^{2} (5,960/sq mi)

| Westbrook | | Takaro |
| | Highbury |
| | Awapuni | West End |

Highbury is a suburb of Palmerston North, New Zealand. The suburb is located northwest of Palmerston North Central (CBD). The area has the characteristics of a suburban area and had a resident population of 4,886 (2018).

Highbury's street name themes range from British place-names (Brighton, Somerset, Lancaster, Coventry, Brentwood) to those of settlers of Palmerston North (Monrad).

A local shopping centre is located on the corner of Highbury Avenue and Pembroke Street, and was revitalised by the Palmerston North city council in 2023. A pouwhenua representing Rongomaraeroa was installed outside the shopping centre in September 2025.

Highbury is part of the Palmerston North and Te Tai Hauāuru electorates.

== Demographics ==
Highbury covers 2.09 km^{2} (0.81 sq mi) and had an estimated population of 4,810 as of June 2025, with a population density of 2,301 people per km^{2}.

Historical population
| Year | Pop. | ±% p.a. |
|---|---|---|
| 2006 | 4,605 | — |
| 2013 | 4,374 | −0.73% |
| 2018 | 4,866 | +2.15% |
| 2023 | 4,818 | −0.20% |

Highbury had a population of 4,818 in the 2023 New Zealand census, a decrease of 48 people (−1.0%) since the 2018 census, and an increase of 444 people (10.2%) since the 2013 census. There were 2,295 males, 2,502 females, and 24 people of other genders in 1,725 dwellings. 2.9% of people identified as LGBTIQ+. There were 1,008 people (20.9%) aged under 15 years, 996 (20.7%) aged 15 to 29, 1,863 (38.7%) aged 30 to 64, and 954 (19.8%) aged 65 or older.

People could identify as more than one ethnicity. The results were 63.2% European (Pākehā); 35.1% Māori; 10.1% Pasifika; 11.1% Asian; 1.5% Middle Eastern, Latin American and African New Zealanders (MELAA); and 1.7% other, which includes people giving their ethnicity as "New Zealander". English was spoken by 94.9%, Māori by 8.9%, Samoan by 2.0%, and other languages by 11.6%. No language could be spoken by 2.3% (e.g. too young to talk). New Zealand Sign Language was known by 0.9%. The percentage of people born overseas was 17.1, compared with 28.8% nationally.

Religious affiliations were 32.2% Christian, 1.4% Hindu, 3.4% Islam, 2.4% Māori religious beliefs, 0.8% Buddhist, 0.6% New Age, and 1.2% other religions. People who answered that they had no religion were 50.6%, and 7.5% of people did not answer the census question.

Of those at least 15 years old, 540 (14.2%) people had a bachelor's or higher degree, 2,079 (54.6%) had a post-high school certificate or diploma, and 1,200 (31.5%) people exclusively held high school qualifications. 138 people (3.6%) earned over $100,000 compared to 12.1% nationally. The employment status of those at least 15 was 1,692 (44.4%) full-time, 414 (10.9%) part-time, and 165 (4.3%) unemployed.

Individual statistical areas
| Name | Area (km^{2}) | Population | Density (per km^{2}) | Dwellings | Median age | Median income |
|---|---|---|---|---|---|---|
| Highbury East | 1.16 | 2,904 | 2,503 | 936 | 31.2 years | $30,800 |
| Park West | 0.93 | 1,914 | 2,058 | 789 | 47.0 years | $33,300 |
| New Zealand | | | | | 38.1 years | $41,500 |

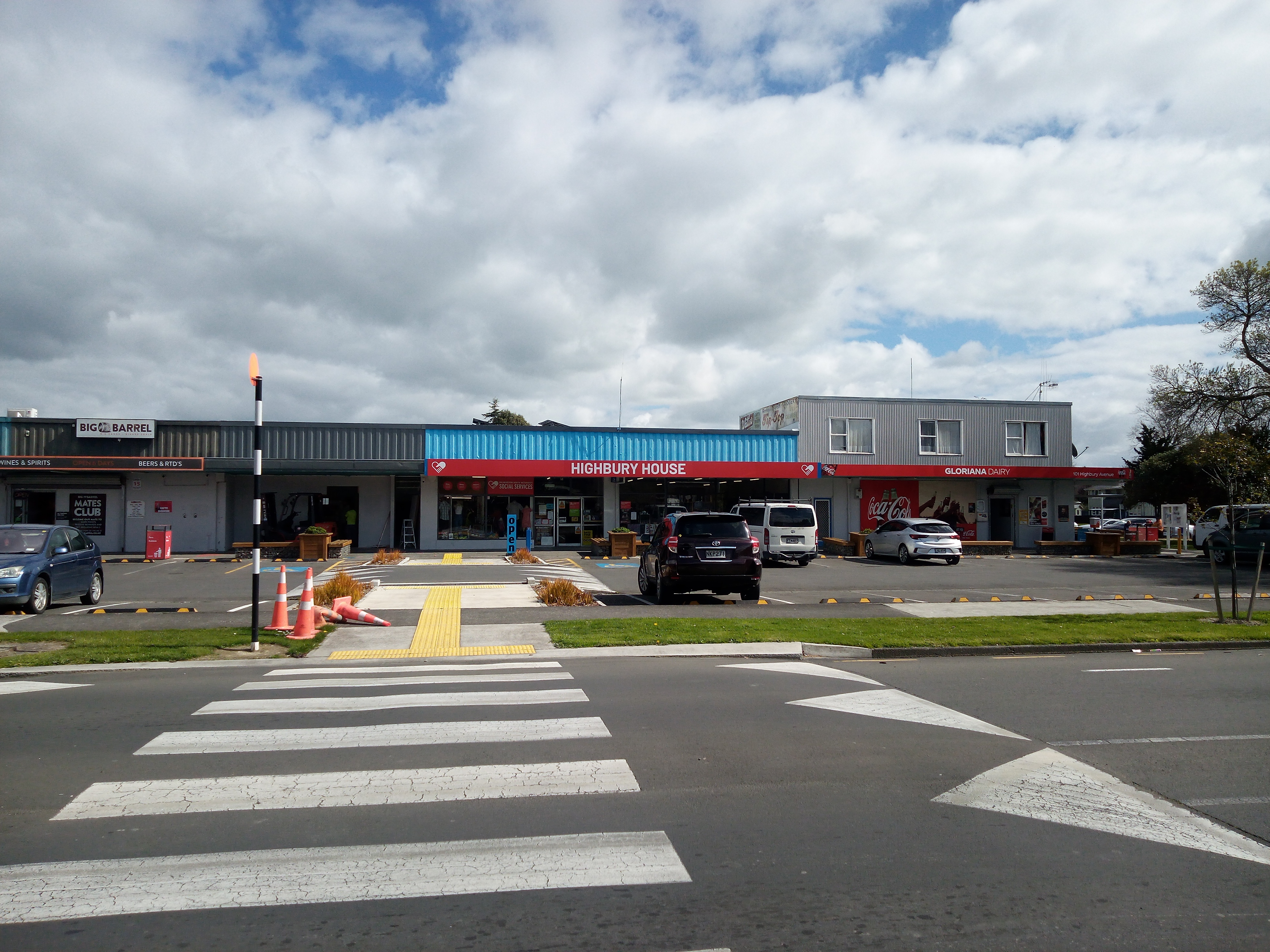
Highbury shopping centre in 2025

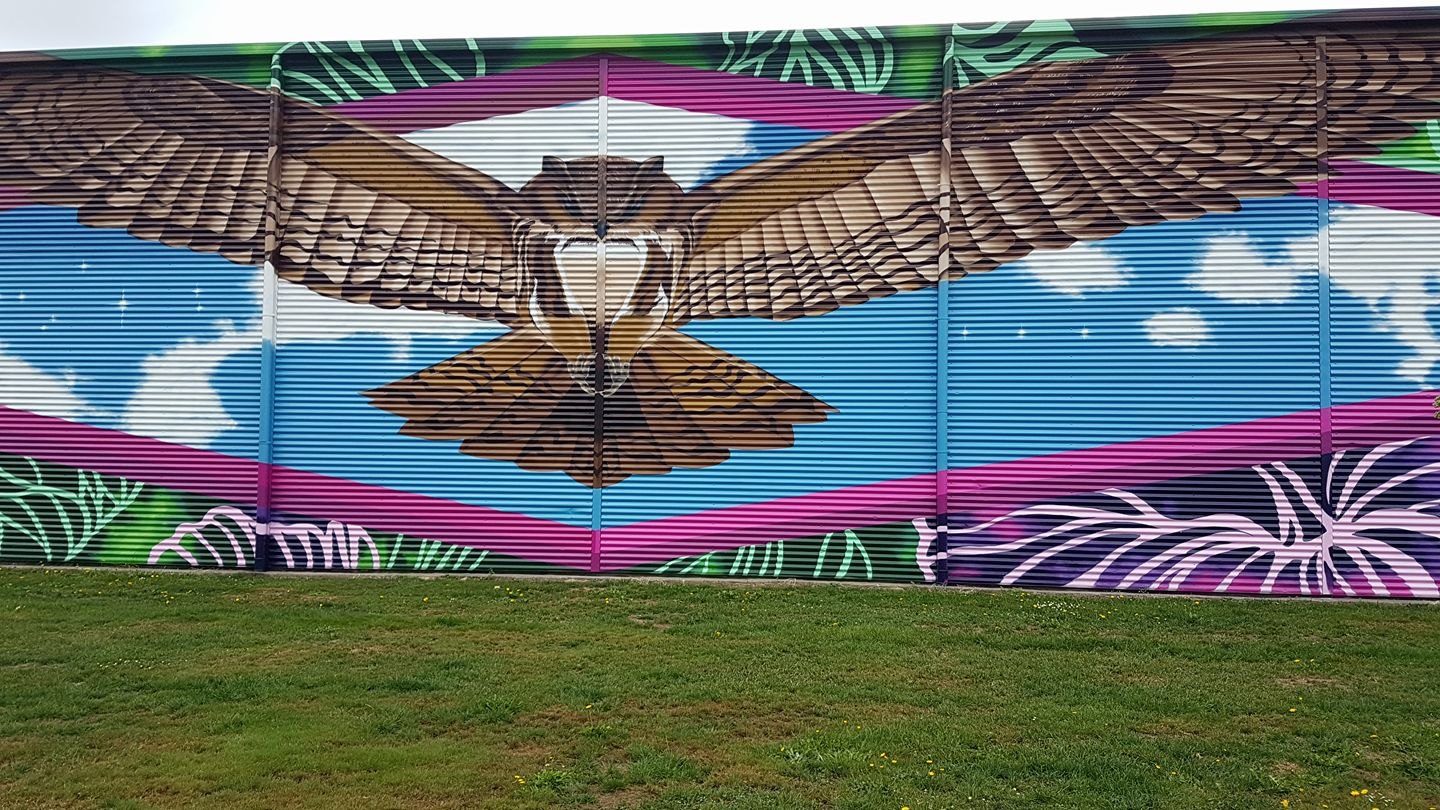
"He Pou Tuatoru o Highbury" mural

== Education ==
Monrad - Te Kura Waenga o Tirohanga is a co-educational state intermediate school, with a roll of 324. It opened in 1963 as Monrad Intermediate and changed its name to Te Kura Waenga o Tirohanga Monrad Intermediate" in 2019.

== Transport ==
Palmerston North bus routes 103, 104, and 108 (to/from the Main Street Bus Hub) serve Highbury.

== Parks and Reserves ==
- Monrad Park
- Takaro Park
- Opie Reserve
- Marriner Reserve
- Part of the Kawau Stream Reserve
- Tui Reserve
- Pembroke Reserve
- Oriana Reserve
- Farnham Reserve
