= Westbrook, Minnesota =

City in Minnesota, United States

Westbrook
- City
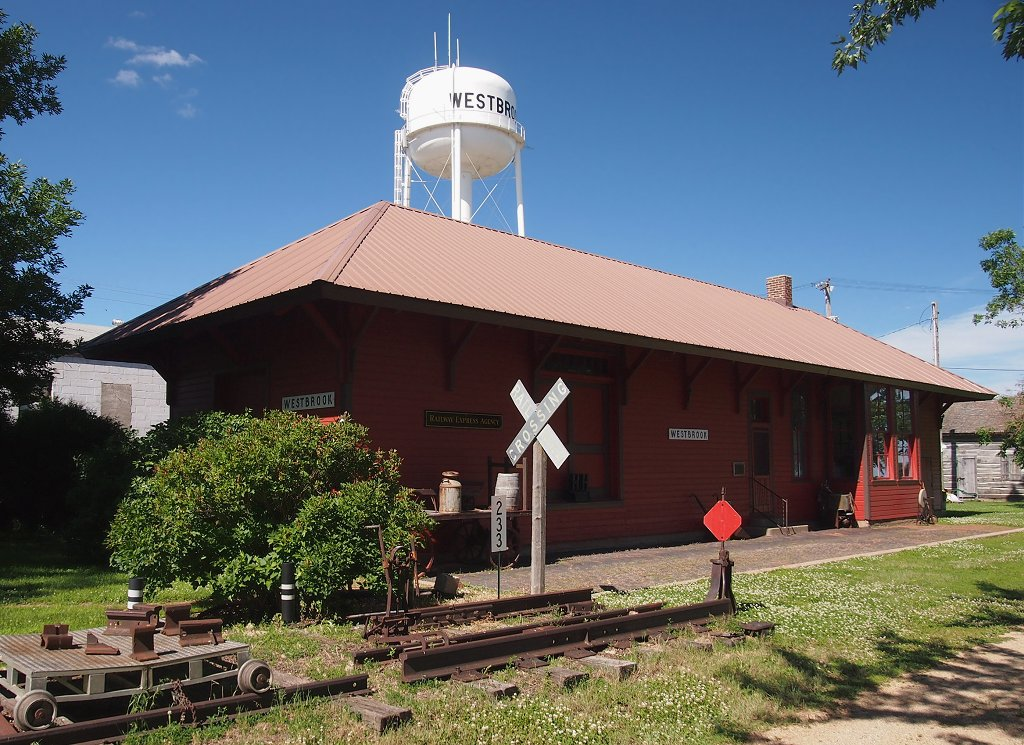
- The old Westbrook Depot and water tower

- Location of Westbrook, Minnesota
- Coordinates: 44°02′32″N 95°26′15″W
- Country: United States
- State: Minnesota
- County: Cottonwood
- founded: Sept. 17, 1870

Government
  - Type: Mayor – Council
  - Mayor: Dennis Phelps

Area
  - Total: 0.67 sq mi (1.74 km^{2})
  - Land: 0.67 sq mi (1.74 km^{2})
  - Water: 0 sq mi (0.00 km^{2})
- Elevation: 1,421 ft (433 m)

Population (2020)
  - Total: 758
  - Density: 1,131.3/sq mi (436.78/km^{2})
- Time zone: UTC−6 (Central (CST))
  - Summer (DST): UTC−5 (CDT)
- ZIP Code: 56183
- Area code: 507
- FIPS code: 27-69250
- GNIS feature ID: 2397278
- Website: https://cityofwestbrookmn.com/

Westbrook is a city in Cottonwood County, Minnesota, United States. The population was 758 at the 2020 census.

== History ==
Westbrook was founded on September 17, 1870, and platted on June 8, 1900. The city was named from its location near the west branch of Highwater Creek.

== Geography ==
According to the United States Census Bureau, the city has an area of 0.78 square miles (2.02 km^{2}), all land.

Minnesota State Highway 30 serves as a main route in the community.

== Demographics ==
Historical population
| Census | Pop. | Note | %± |
|---|---|---|---|
| 1910 | 429 | | — |
| 1920 | 654 | | 52.4% |
| 1930 | 610 | | −6.7% |
| 1940 | 871 | | 42.8% |
| 1950 | 1,017 | | 16.8% |
| 1960 | 1,012 | | −0.5% |
| 1970 | 990 | | −2.2% |
| 1980 | 978 | | −1.2% |
| 1990 | 853 | | −12.8% |
| 2000 | 755 | | −11.5% |
| 2010 | 739 | | −2.1% |
| 2020 | 758 | | 2.6% |
U.S. Decennial Census

=== 2010 census ===
As of the census of 2010, there were 739 people, 345 households, and 192 families residing in the city. The population density was 947.4 inhabitants per square mile (365.8/km^{2}). There were 418 housing units at an average density of 535.9 per square mile (206.9/km^{2}). The racial makeup of the city was 97.7% White, 0.4% Native American, 0.9% Asian, 0.7% from other races, and 0.3% from two or more races. Hispanic or Latino of any race were 2.2% of the population.

There were 345 households, of which 18.6% had children under the age of 18 living with them, 46.7% were married couples living together, 5.2% had a female householder with no husband present, 3.8% had a male householder with no wife present, and 44.3% were non-families. 40.9% of all households were made up of individuals, and 23.4% had someone living alone who was 65 years of age or older. The average household size was 2.04 and the average family size was 2.71.

The median age in the city was 54 years. 18.7% of residents were under the age of 18; 4.8% were between the ages of 18 and 24; 17.6% were from 25 to 44; 25% were from 45 to 64; and 33.8% were 65 years of age or older. The gender makeup of the city was 44.2% male and 55.8% female.

=== 2000 census ===
As of the census of 2000, there were 755 people, 367 households, and 209 families residing in the city. The population density was 974.7 inhabitants per square mile (376.3/km^{2}). There were 412 housing units at an average density of 531.9 per square mile (205.4/km^{2}). The racial makeup of the city was 98.01% White, 0.13% African American, 0.40% Native American, 0.40% Asian, 0.13% from other races, and 0.93% from two or more races. Hispanic or Latino of any race were 0.66% of the population.

There were 367 households, out of which 18.5% had children under the age of 18 living with them, 48.5% were married couples living together, 7.1% had a female householder with no husband present, and 42.8% were non-families. 39.8% of all households were made up of individuals, and 28.3% had someone living alone who was 65 years of age or older. The average household size was 2.06 and the average family size was 2.74.

In the city, the population was spread out, with 20.5% under the age of 18, 4.4% from 18 to 24, 17.7% from 25 to 44, 21.9% from 45 to 64, and 35.5% who were 65 years of age or older. The median age was 52 years. For every 100 females, there were 79.3 males. For every 100 females age 18 and over, there were 74.4 males.

The median income for a household in the city was $24,063, and the median income for a family was $33,472. Males had a median income of $27,188 versus $18,056 for females. The per capita income for the city was $15,919. 13.5% of the population and 8.5% of families were below the poverty line. Out of the total people living in poverty, 28.6% of those under the age of 18 and 9.1% of those 65 and older were living below the poverty line.

== Sister City ==
Walnut Grove, Minnesota and Westbrook are sister cities because Westbrook-Walnut Grove (WWG) Public Schools is distributed between both towns.

== Westbrook-Walnut Grove Public Schools ==
Starting with the 1991–92 school year, the Westbrook Wildcats and the Walnut Grove Loggers combined school districts and sports teams to make the Westbrook-Walnut Grove Chargers.

=== WWG Information ===
- Schools – one High School in Westbrook (Grades 7–12) and one Elementary School in Walnut Grove (Grades K-6)
- Mascot – Chargers
- School Colors – Red and Silver
- ISD – 2898

== Politics ==
Westbrook is in Minnesota's 7th congressional district, represented by Michelle Fischbach, a Republican. At the state level, Westbrook is in Senate District 22, represented by Republican Doug Magnus, and in House District 22B, represented by Republican Rod Hamilton.
