= Westbrook station (Minnesota) =

- Chicago, St. Paul, Minneapolis, and Omaha Depot
- U.S. National Register of Historic Places
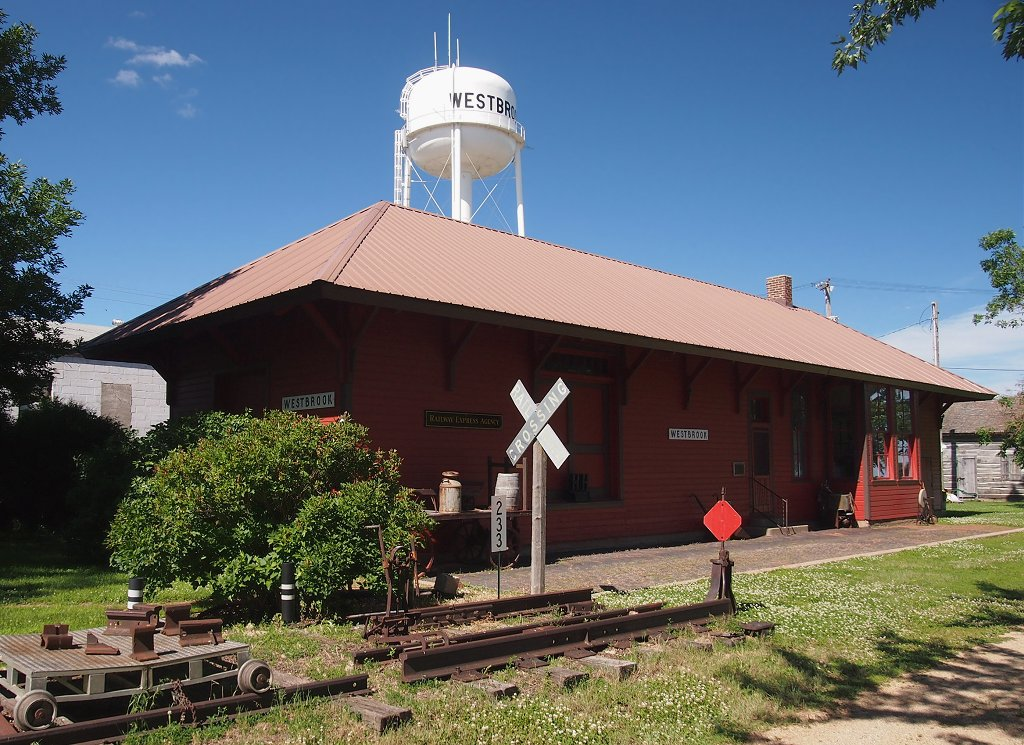
- The Chicago, St. Paul, Minneapolis, and Omaha Depot from the southwest

- Location within Minnesota
- Location: Westbrook, Minnesota
- Coordinates: 44.042591°N 95.436676°W
- Area: less than one acre
- Built: 1900
- Built by: Des Moines Valley Railway Co.
- NRHP reference No.: 86001286
- Added to NRHP: June 13, 1986

The Chicago, St. Paul, Minneapolis, and Omaha Depot was a depot for the Chicago, St. Paul, Minneapolis and Omaha Railway. It is located on Fourth Street at First Avenue in Westbrook, Cottonwood County, Minnesota, United States. It was added to the National Register of Historic Places on June 13, 1986. It is now the Westbrook Heritage House Museum with indoor and outdoor exhibits on local history.

Preceding station	Chicago and North Western Railway	Following station
Dovray toward Currie	Currie Line	Storden toward Bingham Lake
