= Westbrook, Missouri =

Extinct hamlet in Missouri, U.S.

Coordinates: 36.045071°N 89.885919°W

Westbrook is an extinct town in Pemiscot County, in the U.S. state of Missouri.

The community was named after John Westbrook, the proprietor of a local mill.
