= Westbrook, Palmerston North =

Suburb of Palmerston North

Westbrook
- Suburb
- Interactive map of Westbrook
- Coordinates: 40.357°S 175.572°E
- Country: New Zealand
- City: Palmerston North
- Local authority: Palmerston North City Council
- Electoral ward: Te Hirawanui General Ward; Te Pūao Māori Ward

Area
  - Land: 349 ha (860 acres)

Population (June 2025)
  - Total: 3,440
  - Density: 986/km^{2} (2,550/sq mi)

	Newbury	Cloverlea
	Westbrook	Takaro
Longburn		Highbury

Westbrook is a suburb in the city of Palmerston North, New Zealand.

The semi-rural suburb includes the Manawatu Trotting Club, and several parks and reserves: Bill Brown Park, David Spring Park, Kimberley Park, Ashton Reserve, Amberley Reserve, Chippendale Reserve, Chelmarsh Reserve, Marybank Reserve, Dalfield Reserve, and part of the Kawau Stream Reserve.

== Demographics ==
Westbrook covers 3.49 km^{2} (1.35 sq mi) and had an estimated population of 3,440 as of June 2025, with a population density of 986 people per km^{2}.

Historical population
Year	Pop.	±% p.a.
2006	3,039	—
2013	3,003	−0.17%
2018	3,261	+1.66%
2023	3,345	+0.51%

Westbrook had a population of 3,345 in the 2023 New Zealand census, an increase of 84 people (2.6%) since the 2018 census, and an increase of 342 people (11.4%) since the 2013 census. There were 1,665 males, 1,665 females, and 9 people of other genders in 1,137 dwellings. 3.3% of people identified as LGBTIQ+. There were 750 people (22.4%) aged under 15 years, 792 (23.7%) aged 15 to 29, 1,410 (42.2%) aged 30 to 64, and 393 (11.7%) aged 65 or older.

People could identify as more than one ethnicity. The results were 68.0% European (Pākehā); 32.7% Māori; 12.4% Pasifika; 9.3% Asian; 0.9% Middle Eastern, Latin American and African New Zealanders (MELAA); and 1.8% other, which includes people giving their ethnicity as "New Zealander". English was spoken by 95.7%, Māori by 8.3%, Samoan by 2.4%, and other languages by 9.2%. No language could be spoken by 2.3% (e.g. too young to talk). New Zealand Sign Language was known by 1.3%. The percentage of people born overseas was 14.5, compared with 28.8% nationally.

Religious affiliations were 30.3% Christian, 1.5% Hindu, 1.6% Islam, 2.4% Māori religious beliefs, 0.3% Buddhist, 0.5% New Age, and 1.1% other religions. People who answered that they had no religion were 55.2%, and 7.2% of people did not answer the census question.

Of those at least 15 years old, 381 (14.7%) people had a bachelor's or higher degree, 1,467 (56.5%) had a post-high school certificate or diploma, and 741 (28.6%) people exclusively held high school qualifications. 99 people (3.8%) earned over $100,000 compared to 12.1% nationally. The employment status of those at least 15 was 1,317 (50.8%) full-time, 336 (12.9%) part-time, and 114 (4.4%) unemployed.

Individual statistical areas
Name	Area (km^{2})	Population	Density (per km^{2})	Dwellings	Median age	Median income
Westbrook	1.13	3,081	2,727	1,047	31.8 years	$37,000
Pioneer West	2.36	264	112	90	44.4 years	$48,700
New Zealand					38.1 years	$41,500

== Education ==
Te Kura o Wairau is a co-educational state primary school for Year 1 to 6 students, with a roll of 140 as of March 2026. It started in 1963 as Highbury School. In 2002 it became Somerset Crescent School, and it took the current name in 2021.
