= Regent on Broadway =

Theatre in Palmerston North, New Zealand

Coordinates: 40°21′14″S 175°36′46″E

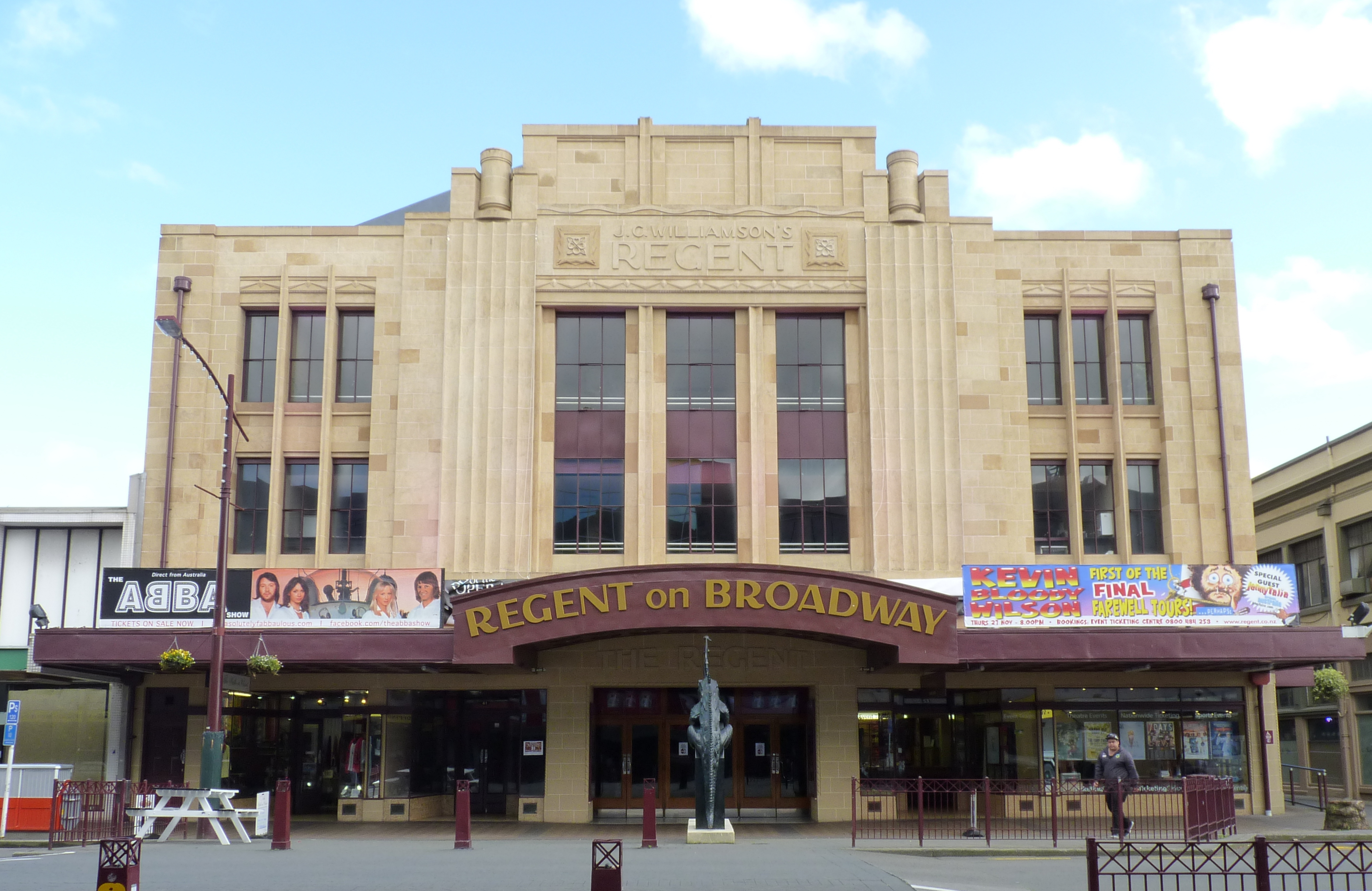
- Interactive map of Regent on Broadway
- Location: Palmerston North, New Zealand
- Owner: Palmerston North City Council
- Capacity: 1393

Construction
- Renovated: May 1998
- Architect: Charles Hollinshed

Heritage New Zealand – Category 1
- Designated: 11 November 1989
- Reference no.: 5104

The Regent on Broadway is a large theatre in Palmerston North, New Zealand, named so because it is the Regent Theatre on Broadway Avenue.

== History ==
Designed in 1929 by Charles Hollinshed of Sydney, the theatre complex was officially opened to the public on 4 July 1930. Its original use was as a cinema and opera house, but, with the decline of the movie over the decades, the Regent closed in 1991. The Palmerston North City Council acquired the building in 1992 by swapping it with the previous owner for the Opera House. In 1993 money was raised to fully restore the building, with the PNCC to contribute the sum of NZ$10,000,000, followed by a community donation of NZ$1,700,000, and NZ$1,000,000 from New Zealand Lotteries Grant Board.

The auditorium has painted panels on the roof, all of which were cleaned during the renovations of the 1990s. The staircase leading up to the mezzanine floor is carpeted in the centre, with marble on the sides. The lobby is carpeted, with a special weave being manufactured by Feltex carpets, an exact copy of the linoleum, still lying underneath the carpet. The mezzanine floor has carved kowhaiwhai panels in the ceiling.

The building is listed as a Category 1 Historic Place by Heritage New Zealand.

== Today ==
Regent On Broadway is described as being "among the top four performing arts centres in New Zealand", alongside Wellington Town Hall, Christchurch Town Hall and Auckland Town Hall. The auditorium can seat 1393 people: 721 on the ground floor and 672 in the circle (upstairs). Some of the downstairs seating can be removed for functions such as dinners and ballroom dancing. Adjacent to the auditorium are several small dressing rooms, and larger dressing rooms are up a flight of stairs. The venue boasts a large function room, upstairs from the mezzanine, and a rehearsal studio, which is used for a variety of activities, ranging from ballet dancing to stage rehearsals. Because of the wide range of activities available, it is one of New Zealand's busiest venues. It remains the only large theatre in the greater Palmerston North area.
