= List of people from Palmerston North =

The following is a list of notable people who were born or lived in Palmerston North, New Zealand, and people who spent significant periods of their lives living in the Manawatu region.

See Category:People from Palmerston North

== Famous Business People ==
- Lloyd Morrison, founder & CEO of Infratil Limited
- Morton Coutts, brewer, developed continuous fermentation method.
- Joseph Nathan, founder of Glaxo
- Leopold Henry Collinson, founder of Collinson and Cunninghame's

== Creative artists ==
- Joy Cowley, children's author
- Brian Boyd, World expert on Nabokov
- Paul Dibble, sculptor
- Andrew Drummond, sculptor
- Pat Hanly, artist
- Judy Bailey, former newsreader, deemed "Mother of the Nation"
- Olaf Wiig, photojournalist
- Saffronn Te Ratana, artist
- Leonard Mitchell, artist
- Sarah Ann McMurray, woodcarver

== Politicians and leaders ==
=== Members of Parliament for Palmerston North, Manawatu and Rangitikei ===
- Trevor de Cleene, Labour MP (1981–90).
- Iain Lees-Galloway, Labour MP for Palmerston North (2008–2020)
- Steve Maharey, Labour MP for Palmerston North (1990–2008) and now retired from Parliament. Former Vice-Chancellor of Massey University (2008–2016).
- Jimmy Nash, former Mayor and MP for Palmerston (North).
- Simon Power, National MP; grew up in Palmerston North, former MP for Rangitikei (1999–2011). Now retired from Parliament.
- William Blair Tennent, former Mayor and National MP, represented Palmerston North (1949–54).
- Joe Walding, Labour MP (1967–75; 1978–81)
- Jill White, Labour MP for Manawatu; elected Mayor of Palmerston North (1998–2001); former councillor on Horizons Regional Council.

=== other MPs: other electorates and List ===
- Ashraf Choudhary, Labour list MP; now retired from Parliament.
- Jacqui Dean, National MP; grew up in Palmerston North. Former MP for Waitaki; now retired from Parliament.
- Lynne Pillay, Labour MP; now retired from Parliament.
- Grant Robertson, Labour list MP; former MP for Wellington Central and 19th Deputy Prime Minister; now retired from Parliament.
- Metiria Turei, Green MP and former co-leader of the party; now retired from Parliament.
- David Seymour, ACT MP; 1st Minister for Regulation, current Party Leader and Current MP for Epsom.

=== Mayors ===
- Jono Naylor, major (2007–14).
- Heather Tanguay, mayor (2004–07).
- Mark Bell-Booth, mayor (2001–04).
- Jill White, mayor (1998–2001).
- Paul Rieger mayor (1985–98).
- Brian Elwood mayor (1971–85)
- George Snelson, (1877–1879, 1883–1884, 1889–1892, 1901), first mayor. Snelson is regarded as the founding father of Palmerston North.

=== Other ===
- Zillah Gill, local body politician
- Scott Ludlam, Australian Greens WA Federal Senator (2008–2017)
- Hedwig (Hettie) Ross (née Weitzel), a founding member of the Communist Party of New Zealand

== Actors, performers, models, broadcasters, television presenters/hosts ==
- David Geary, screenwriter and actor
- John Clarke, satirist famous as character "Fred Dagg"
- Shane Cortese, actor
- Jeremy Corbett, comic
- Hamish McKay (TV3 Sports Presenter)
- Simon Ferry, actor
- Nick Gibb, comic
- Rachel Crofts (Miss Manawatu - 2006 & Miss Earth NZ - 2008)
- Claire Kirby (Miss Manawatu - 2007 & Miss Earth NZ - 2007)
- Alison Quigan (Actor, Director and Playwright)
- Spankie Jackzon (drag performer and artist)
- Laura Daniel (actor, comic)
- Matthew Sunderland (Actor)

== Musical artists ==
- Gary Brain, conductor
- Rosina Buckman, operatic soprano
- Stuart Easton, piper
- Rodger Fox, trombonist
- Alan Gregg, (bass player), The Mutton Birds
- Nigel Keay, (composer)
- Anna Leese, operatic soprano
- Alan Loveday, violinist
- PNC, rapper
- Benny Tipene, singer-songwriter and musician

== Sportspeople ==
- Jamie Booth – Hurricane, Turbo, former Sunwolves halfback
- Tomasi Cama - Manawatu Rugby representative and New Zealand All Blacks Sevens star
- Matthew Conger – FIFA International football Referee
- Craig Clare – former Manawatu Turbos rugby player
- Aaron Cruden - All Black, plays Super Rugby for the Chiefs.
- Christian Cullen – former All Black rugby player
- Mark Donaldson – Former All Black rugby player
- Jason Eaton – former All Black rugby player; later moved to Taranaki
- Jason Emery – Manawatu Turbo and Highlander; now plays in Japan
- Kris Gemmell – International triathlete
- Brendon Hartley – former F1 driver for Toro Rosso
- Ngani Laumape – All Black, Hurricane, Turbo, former NZ Warrior.
- Jake Gleeson – Footballer playing for Portland Timbers in Major League Soccer
- Bevan Griggs
- Jamie How - former cricket player
- David Kirk – former All Black, captain of the winning team at the 1987 Rugby World Cup. Later became CEO of Fairfax Australia.
- Jono Lester - Professional racing driver in Super GT (Japan).
- Michael Mason – former New Zealand Black Cap and Central Districts bowler
- Jake McKinlay – basketball player
- Adam Milne - current Black Cap cricketer
- Nehe Milner-Skudder – All Black, Hurricane and Turbo
- Charles John Monro – founder of rugby union in New Zealand, lived for a time in an area now part of Palmerston North
- Emily Naylor - current New Zealand Black Sticks player.
- Steven Old - former New Zealand All White (soccer)
- Jacob Oram - former cricket player
- Farah Palmer - former New Zealand Black Fern
- Craig Perks - International golfer
- Reece Robinson - former Manawatu Turbo
- Moira Senior - former New Zealand Black Sticks Hockey player.
- Levi Sherwood
- Joe Schmidt - former head coach of Leinster Rugby, current head coach of Ireland national rugby union team.
- Aaron Smith - All Black (current)
- Craig Spearman - former Black Cap, cricket player
- James Tamou - current Australian Kangaroo, has previously represented New Zealand Maori, switched allegiance to New South Wales and became eligible to play for Australia)
- Jade Te Rure - Rugby union player, currently playing for Yorkshire Carnegie.
- Ricky Thorby - Rugby League player, currently without an NRL club.
- Ross Taylor - current New Zealand Black Caps captain and Central Districts batsman (cricket)
- Dion Waller - former rugby player.
- Grant Webb
- Adam Whitelock - Crusader
- George Whitelock - Crusader
- Kayla Whitelock - New Zealand Black Sticks Hockey Women's.
- Sam Whitelock - All Black (current)
- Tim Wilkinson - professional golfer
- Selica Winiata - Black Fern, NZ Women's Sevens and Manawatu Cyclone (Current)
- George Worker - Blackcap, Central Districts Stag (current).

== Activists, philanthropists ==
- Fred Hollows, ophthalmologist

== Academics and scientists ==
- Gordon Herriot Cunningham (1892–1962), mycologist and plant pathologist
- Guy Dodson (1937–2012), biochemist who specialised in protein crystallography
- John Dunmore (1923–2023), historian, founder of Modern Languages Dept, Massey University
- Margot Forde (1935–1992), botanist, curator, and taxonomist

== Others ==
- Rayed Mohammed Abdullah Ali, briefly resident in the city in 2006 on a student visa until deported because he "posed a threat to national security", having been an associate of Hani Hanjour, one of the hijacking pilots in the September 11, 2001 attacks
- Madge Allsop (fictional). Played by Emily Perry and others, she starred as the sidekick of Dame Edna Everidge (played by Barry Humphries) for 14 episodes of the Dame Edna Experience (1987–1989). In reference to Madge's drab appearance and demeanour, Humphries would often deride her by simply telling the audience "she's from Palmerston North."
