= Athletics at the 1972 Summer Paralympics – Men's pentathlon 2 =

Men's pentathlon 2 at the IV Paralympic Games
- Paralympic Athletics
- Competitors: 5 from 4 nations

Medalists
| 1st place, gold medalist(s) | | Josef Jager | Austria |
| 2nd place, silver medalist(s) | | Schmicking | West Germany |
| 3rd place, bronze medalist(s) | | Graeme Marett | New Zealand |

The Men's pentathlon 2 was one of the events held in athletics at the 1972 Summer Paralympics in Heidelberg.

There were five competitors in the event.

Josef Jager of Austria won the gold medal.

== Results ==
=== Final ===
| Rank | Athlete | Points |
|---|---|---|
| 1st place, gold medalist(s) | Josef Jager (AUT) | 5501 |
| 2nd place, silver medalist(s) | Schmicking (FRG) | 5413 |
| 3rd place, bronze medalist(s) | Graeme Marett (NZL) | 5203 |
| 4 | Wasnock (CAN) | 4152 |
| 5 | Leo Close (NZL) | 3801 |
