= New Zealand at the 1972 Summer Paralympics =

- IPC code: NZL
- NPC: Paralympics New Zealand
- Website: paralympics.org.nz

in Heidelberg
- Competitors: 10
- Medals: Gold 3 Silver 3 Bronze 3 Total 9

Summer Paralympics appearances (overview)
- 1968; 1972; 1976; 1980; 1984; 1988; 1992; 1996; 2000; 2004; 2008; 2012; 2016; 2020; 2024

New Zealand sent a delegation to compete at the 1972 Summer Paralympics in Heidelberg, West Germany. They sent ten competitors, seven male and three female. The team consisted of Graham Condon, Leo Close, Neroli Fairhall, Graeme Marett, Keith McCormick, Dennis Miller, Tina Morgan, Chris Nicholls, Eve Rimmer, and Jim Savage.

The New Zealand contingent brought back nine medals, with five of the ten competitors obtaining medals.

== Medallists ==
Medal	Name	Sport	Event
Gold	Graham Condon	Athletics	Men's Discus 3
Gold	Eve Rimmer	Athletics	Women's Pentathlon 3
Gold	Eve Rimmer	Athletics	Women's Shot Put 3
Silver	Graeme Marett	Athletics	Men's Discus 2
Silver	Eve Rimmer	Athletics	Women's Discus 3
Silver	Eve Rimmer	Athletics	Women's Javelin 3
Bronze	Graeme Marett	Athletics	Men's Pentathlon 2
Bronze	Jim Savage	Athletics	Men's Shot Put 3
Bronze	Tina Morgan	Swimming	Women's 25 m Freestyle 1B

== Disability classifications ==
Athletes at the Paralympics in 1972 were all afflicted by spinal cord injuries and required the use of a wheelchair. This is in contrast to later Paralympics that include events for participants that fit into any of five different disability categories; amputation, either congenital or sustained through injury or illness; cerebral palsy; wheelchair athletes; visual impairment, including blindness; Les autres, any physical disability that does not fall strictly under one of the other categories, for example dwarfism or multiple sclerosis. Each Paralympic sport then has its own classifications, dependent upon the specific physical demands of competition. Events are given a code, made of numbers and letters, describing the type of event and classification of the athletes competing.
