= All Saints' Church, Palmerston North =

All Saints' Church
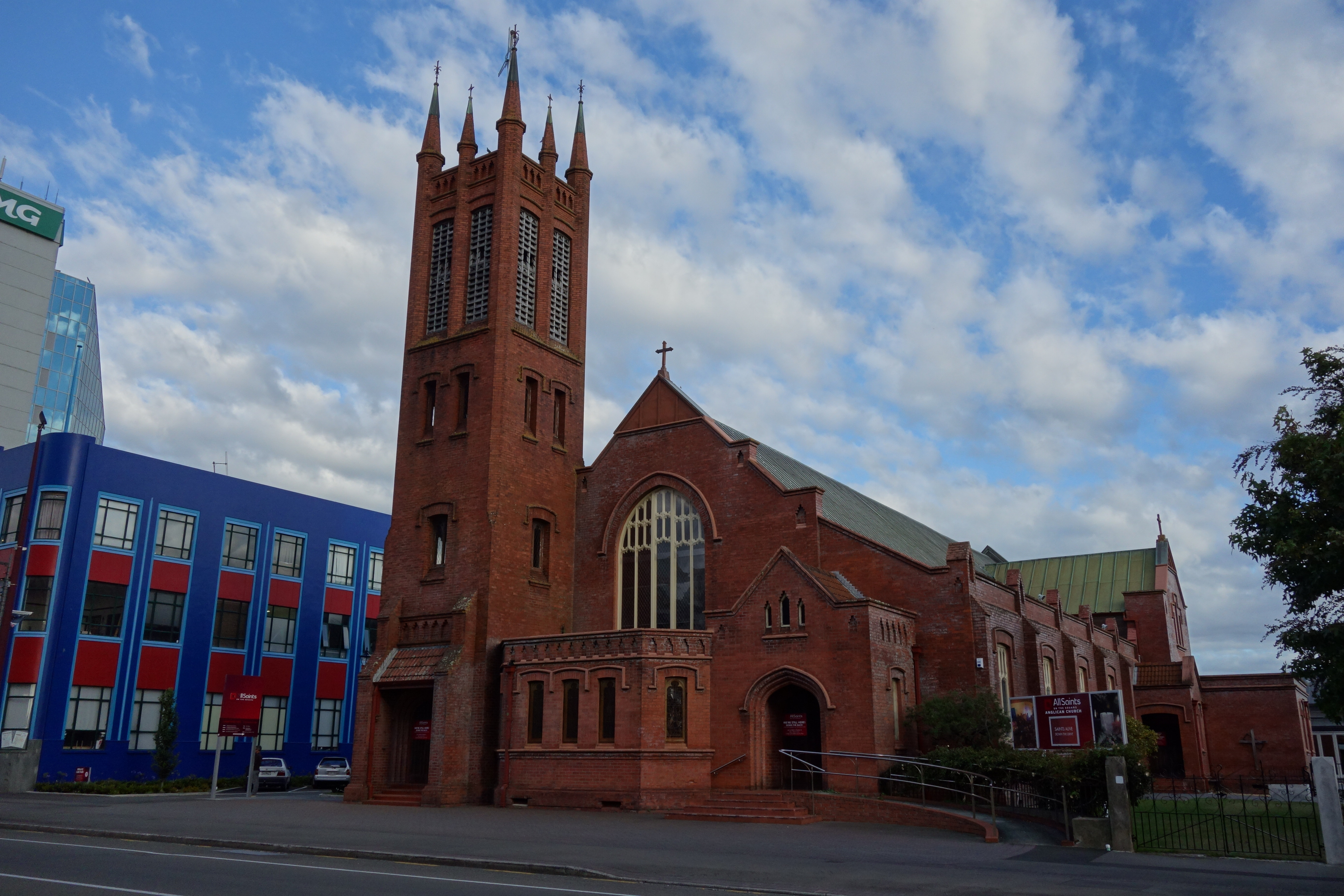
- All Saints Church in 2014
- All Saints' Church
- 40°21′29.5″S 175°36′38.8″E
- Location: Palmerston North
- Country: New Zealand
- Denomination: Anglican
- Website: www.allsaintspn.org.nz

History
- Status: Parish church
- Dedication: Saint George
- Dedicated: 6 May 1914
- Consecrated: 29 October 1916

Architecture
- Functional status: Closed for earthquake strengthening
- Architect: Frederick de Jersey Clere
- Style: English Gothic architecture
- Years built: February 1913 – May 1914
- Groundbreaking: 15 February 1913
- Construction cost: NZ£7,800
- Closed: 1 April 2013

Specifications
- Capacity: 950
- Materials: bricks

Clergy
- Vicar: Chris Dodds

Heritage New Zealand – Category 1
- Designated: 16 November 1989
- Reference no.: 191

All Saints' Church in Palmerston North, New Zealand, is an Anglican heritage-registered church designed by eminent architect Frederick de Jersey Clere. The church has been closed since 2013 over concerns about earthquake resistance but there are plans to strengthen the structure.

== Location ==
Bishop Octavius Hadfield purchased the land for the church in 1875. The section is located just off The Square in Church Street. The Grand Hotel, also a category I listed building, is located directly opposite on the north side of Church Street.

== History ==
The foundation stone for the first church on the site was laid by Louisa Snelson, the wife of Palmerston North's founding father, George Snelson, on 29 September 1875. Saint George was chosen as the patron saint. The first building soon ran out of room and in 1881–82, a larger church was erected, with the original building becoming the transept. This building was soon after enlarged by adding a southern aisle.

In 1883, Clere became the architect for the Anglican Diocese of Wellington and during his career, he designed over 100 churches for them. Clere was commissioned in 1905 by Archdeacon Charles Coleridge Harper to prepare plans for a new church; this was to have been the third church built on the land. His first design was rejected but the need for a new church remained and in 1910, the existing timber church was moved to the rear of the site to make room for a new building. In 1913, Clere was once more commissioned to prepare an architectural design.

Clere designed the church in an English Gothic architectural style emphasising bricks as the construction material; he used the English bond pattern. The church provides seating for 950 people. John Henry Meyer was the builder and he commenced work in mid-February 1913. The laying of the foundation stone on 7 November 1913 by Bishop Sprott was marred by very bad weather. The construction of the brick church was supervised by Herbert Clere, the architect's son, from his Palmerston North office. The opening ceremony was held by Bishop Sprott from Wellington on Wednesday, 6 May 1914. Bishop Sprott consecrated the altar as part of the opening ceremony, but the church itself was not consecrated due to a rule by the diocese that churches will only be consecrated once they have become free of debt. Consecration of the church was initially expected to happen on All Saints' Day (1 November) of that year, but the NZ£1,500 of remaining debt of the NZ£7,800 completion cost could not be raised in time. The consecration was undertaken on Sunday, 29 October 1916, by Bishop Sprott.

=== Interior features ===
The first stained glass window was installed soon after the church opened. It is installed in the east wall of the side chapel, and commemorates early parishioners James Skerman and his wife. The second stained glass window was installed just before the building's consecration to commemorate Henry Scott McKellar, one of the founders of the Anglican Church in New Zealand. The Great East Window was installed in 1924 as a memorial to soldiers who died in World War I. The Scout and Guide Corner holds a memorial lamp to victims of the Tangiwai disaster on Christmas Eve of 1953. Frank Guernsey carved the altar from Oamaru stone in 1939, and the reredos (an altarpiece) from kauri in 1944. The organ was installed in 1929.

=== Heritage registration ===
All Saints Church was registered by the New Zealand Historic Places Trust (now known as Heritage New Zealand as a category I heritage building on 16 November 1989 with registration number 191.

=== Closure ===
Following the 2011 Christchurch earthquake, territorial authorities throughout the country commissioned structural assessments of buildings used by the public. Palmerston North City Council found that All Saints Church achieved just 3% of the strength required by the New Zealand building code, and the parish administration thus announced in November 2012 that the church would be closed on 1 April 2013 after that year's Easter service. Only a few months later, the July 2013 Seddon earthquake caused some cracking in the brickwork. The church suffered some minor damage in the 2014 Eketahuna earthquake; mortar and some more bricks cracked, and a stone figure fell off the altar and broke. In April 2014, it was reported that earthquake strengthening would cost circa NZ$4 million, but that efforts were underway to fund-raise that amount. The parish formally resolved in October 2015 that the church be strengthened.

=== List of vicars ===
The following vicars have served since the first church was built on the site:

- Rev J. A. Newth (1878–1880)
- Rev J. Lloyd Keating (1880–1882)
- Rev W. A. Leech (1883–1884)
- Rev H. E. Copinger (1884–1887)
- Rev H. B. Harvey (1887–1895)
- Rev H. F. Hunt (1895–1900)
- Venerable Archdeacon Harper (1900–1910)
- Rev H. G. Rosher (1911–1915)
- Rev H. G. Blackburne (1915–1924)
- Rev Canon William Fancourt (1924–1929)
- Rev Canon George Young Woodward (1929–?)
- Rev Brian Carrell (1982-91)
- Rev John Wilson
- John Marquet (2007–2016)
- Nigel Dixon
