= George Guido Schwartz =

New Zealand architect (1853–1926)

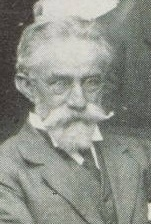
Schwartz in 1911

George Guido Schwartz (1853–1926) was a New Zealand architect. Schwartz was born in Hamburg and studied there and in Stuttgart before practising in various cities around western Germany. Schwartz came to New Zealand to follow his brother but struggled to obtain work and worked as an actuary until 1896, when he started a full-time architectural career that lasted until his death in 1926. Schwartz mostly designed domestic and commercial premises and several of his surviving works are scheduled with the Wellington City Council and Heritage New Zealand.

== Early life ==
George Guido Schwartz was born in the Free and Hanseatic City of Hamburg in 1853. Schwartz studied architecture in Hamburg and Stuttgart and in 1871 articled to Theo Necker. With Necker he worked in Hamburg, Wiesbaden, Frankfurt, Saarbrucken, and Stuttgart.

== New Zealand ==
In 1878 Schwartz came to New Zealand aboard the Lanarkshire. Schwartz' brother had made the voyage earlier and worked as an account and actuary for the Government Life Insurance Company. Schwartz initially worked in Wellington but by 1885 he was working as a draughtsman in Christchurch. Architectural work was hard to come by and Schwartz worked as an actuary for the Government Life Insurance company, he remained with the company until 1896 to return to architecture. Schwartz mainly designed commercial and residential properties in the wider Wellington region. Schwartz designed many homes in the Queen Anne style. Schwartz practised architecture up until his death in 1926.

Schwartz was a founding member of the New Zealand Institute of Architects and served as the first vice-president. In 1912 Schwartz became a Licentiate of the Royal Institute of British Architects, with the support of Alfred Atkins, Roger Bacon, and Frederick de Jersey Clere.

== Personal life ==
Schwartz married his wife in 1883 and had two daughters.

Schwartz was an avid musician, he played the French horn and was a member of the Wellington Orchestral Society. Schwartz owned a yacht, the Waiwetu, which he used for racing. Schwartz was a Freemason.

== List of works ==
Name	Date	Image	Note	Ref
United Fruit Company Building	1887		Registered as a category 2 building and as part of the Lambton Quay Historic Area with Heritage New Zealand	
Lazule	1896		Registered with Heritage New Zealand as part of the Cuba Street Historic Area	
2–8 Footscray Avenue	1896		Registered with Heritage New Zealand as the Footscray Avenue Historic Area	
6 Stafford Street	1897		Scheduled with the Wellington City Council	
292 Tinakori Road	1897		Scheduled with the Wellington City Council	
Empire Hotel	1897			
Carlton Hotel	c.1900			
11 Brougham Street	1900			
Donisthorpe	1906		Scheduled with the Wellington City Council	
Barker and Pollock building	1920		Registered with Heritage New Zealand as part of the Cuba Street Historic Area	
Temuka Courthouse	1900		Attributed to Schwartz by Peter Richardson but most sources consider it a different architect's work. Registered as a category 2 building with Heritage New Zealand	
