= 2025 Palmerston North City Council election =

Elections in New Zealand

- 11 October 2025
- Turnout: 25,060 (42.13% ▲5.40 pp)
- Mayor
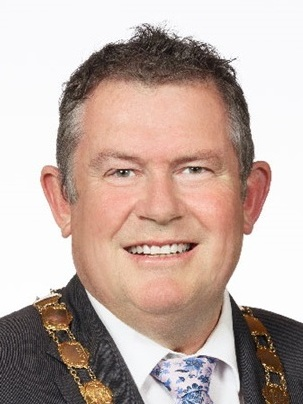

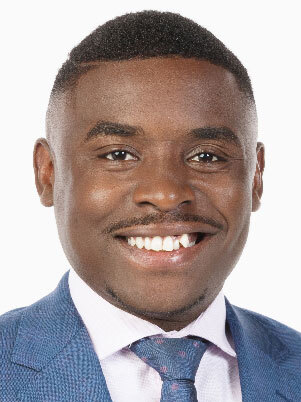
			Ind
Candidate	Grant Smith	Orphée Mickalad	Caleb Riddick
Party	Independent	Independent	Independent
Primary vote	15,124	5,310	2,427
Percentage	60.35%	21.190%	9.68%
Mayor before election
Grant Smith
Independent
Elected mayor
Grant Smith
Independent
- Councillors
- 15 seats on the governing body of Palmerston North City Council; 8 seats needed for a majority
Party	Seats	+/–
Independent	11	+1
Green	2	0
Labour	1	0
Te Pāti Māori	1	+1
This lists parties that won seats. See the complete results below.

The 2025 Palmerston North City Council election was a local election held from 9 September to 11 October in Palmerston North, New Zealand, as part of that year's territorial authority elections and other local elections held nation-wide.

Voters elected the mayor of Palmerston North and 15 city councillors for the 2025–2028 term of the Palmerston North City Council. Postal voting and the single transferable vote system were used.

Incumbent mayor Grant Smith won re-election to a fourth term.

The council introduced a Māori ward at the 2022 election; in a referendum on its future held at this election (as part of a nation-wide series of referendums) voters elected to keep the Māori ward.

== Key dates ==
- 4 July 2025: Nominations for candidates opened
- 1 August 2025: Nominations for candidates closed at 12 pm
- 9 September 2025: Voting documents were posted and voting opened
- 11 October 2025: Voting closed at 12 pm and progress results were published that afternoon
- 12 October 2025: Preliminary results were published
- 16–19 October 2025: Final results were declared.

== Background ==
=== Positions up for election ===
Voters in the city elected the mayor of Palmerston North and 15 city councillors in 2 wards. They also elected several members of the Horizons Regional Council. (Note: 4 members from the city.; 1 member partially from the city in the Tonga Māori constituency.)

== Campaign ==
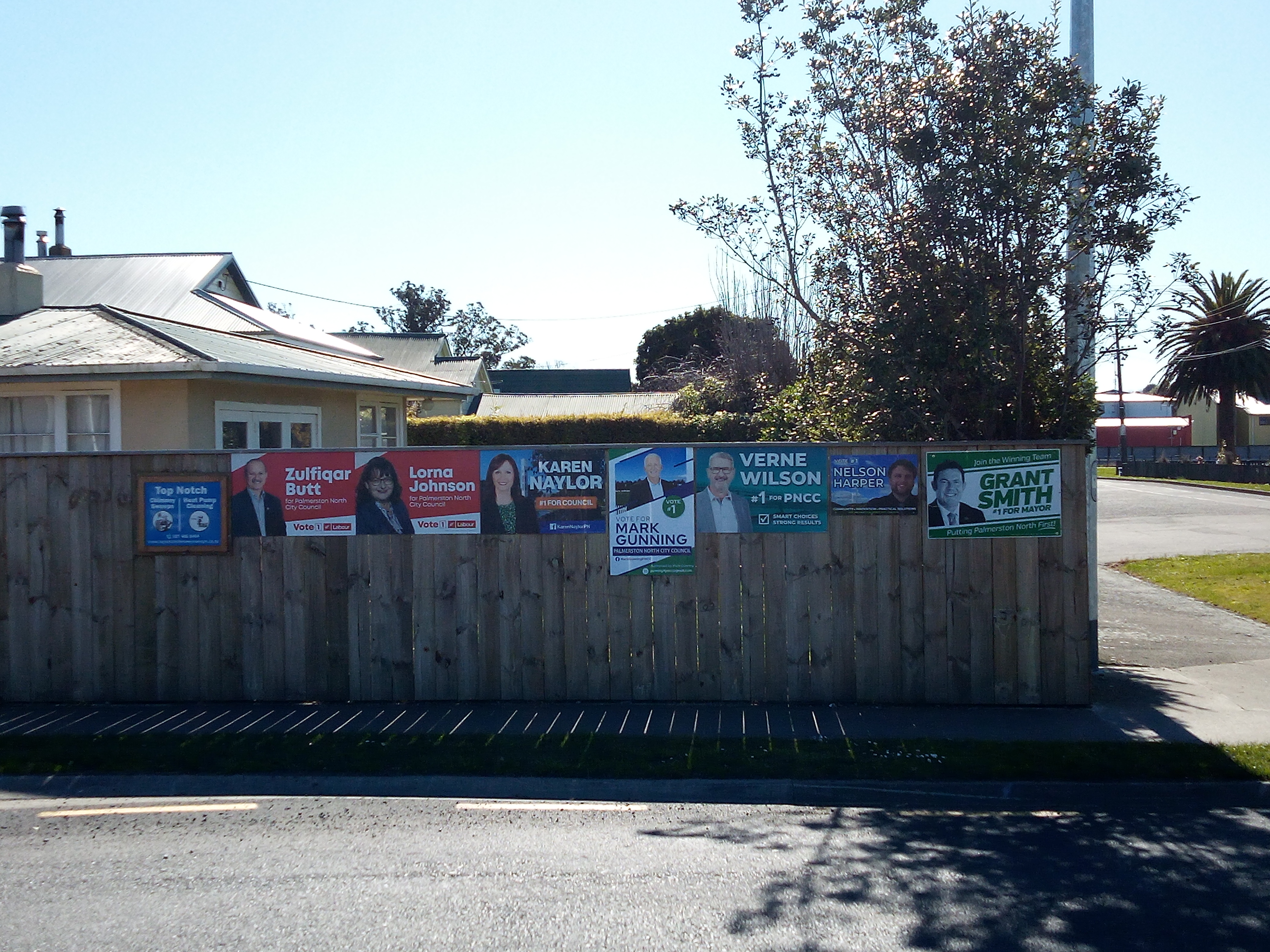
A fence in Ashhurst, covered in campaign placards for various candidates

== List of candidates ==
=== Incumbents not seeking re-election ===
- Pat Handcock, councillor since 2019

=== Mayor ===
Candidate	Affiliation (Note: A candidate may leave their affiliation blank, run as an independent, or run with an affiliation to an organisation, local body ticket or political party. Palmerston North City Council does not allow election slogans to be used for the affiliation.)	Notes
Orphée Mickalad	Independent	Councillor for the Te Hirawanui general ward since 2021. Also ran for re-election as a councillor.
Michael Morris	None	Environmental scientist and vegan
Caleb Riddick	Independent	Also ran for council in the general ward
Grant Smith	Independent	Incumbent mayor since 2015

=== Councillors ===
==== Te Pūao Māori ward ====
Te Pūao Māori ward returned two councillors to the city council.

Candidate	Affiliation	Notes
Rowland Prince Fitzgerald	None	Incumbent councillor since 2022
Bonnie Kuru	None	
Debi Marshall-Lobb	Te Pāti Māori	Incumbent deputy mayor and councillor since 2022

==== Te Hirawanui general ward ====
Te Hirawanui general ward returned thirteen councillors to the city council.

Candidate	Affiliation	Notes
Wajeha Akbaryan	Independent	
Mark Arnott	None	Incumbent councillor
Brent Barrett	Green	Incumbent councillor since 2016
Rachel Bowen	None	Incumbent councillor
Melanie Butler	Independent	Previously ran for council in 2022.
Zulfiqar Butt	Labour	Former city councillor from 2019–2022
Vaughan Dennison	Independent	Incumbent councillor since 2001
Kayne John Dunlop	None	
Lew Findlay	Independent	Incumbent councillor
Hayden Fitzgerald	Independent	
Mark Gunning	Independent	
Leonie Hapeta	None	Incumbent councillor
Nelson Harper	Independent	Chief executive of Precycle NZ
Jeremy Craig Hoskins	None	
Cameron Jenkins	Independent	
Lorna Johnson	Labour	Incumbent councillor since 2016
Eric Judd	Independent	
Jack Koh	None	
Quintin McGregor	None	
Billy Meehan	Independent	Incumbent councillor
Orphée Mickalad	Independent	Incumbent councillor. Also ran for mayor.
Tobias Wilson Nash	None	
Karen Naylor	Independent	Incumbent councillor
Adrian Phillips	None	
Eldhose Poovathumveettil Mathew	Independent	
Dave Poppelwell	Independent	Previously ran for council in 2013. New Conservatives Party parliamentary candidate in 2020.
Atif Rahim	None	Founder of hearing aid charity Hearing for Hope. Previously ran for council in 2022.
Caleb Riddick	Independent	Also ran for mayor
Zakk Rokkanno	Independent	Previously stood for council in 2022
Dave Salisbury	Independent	
Michael Paul Strachan	None	
Jackie Wheeler	Independent	Organiser of Palmerston North Residents group.
Glen Williams	ACT Local	Business owner
Verne Wilson	Independent	
William George Wood	None	Incumbent councillor
Richard Woolgar	Independent	
Kaydee Zabelin	Green	Incumbent councillor since 2022

== Results ==
With the final results, the following candidates were declared elected:

=== Mayor ===
Incumbent mayor Grant Smith won re-election to a fourth term.

2025 Palmerston North mayoral election
Party	Candidate	Primary votes	%	±%	Iteration	
Party	Candidate	Primary votes	%	±%	#	Votes
Independent	Grant Smith^{†}	15,124	60.35	−15.67	1st	15,124
Independent	Orphée Mickalad	5,310	21.19	(new)	1st	5,310
Independent	Caleb Riddick	2,427	9.68	(new)	1st	2,427
Independent	Michael Morris	1,121	4.47	(new)	1st	1,121
Quota		11,991	47.85	−0.25		
Informal votes		101	0.40	+0.11		
Blank votes		977	3.90	+0.35		
Turnout		25,060	42.13	+5.40		
Registered electors		59,478				
Independent hold on 1st iteration						
^{†} incumbent

=== Council ===
==== Te Hirawanui general ward ====
2025 Te Hirawanui general ward election
Party	Candidate	Primary votes	%	±%	Iteration	
Party	Candidate	Primary votes	%	±%	#	Votes
Independent	William George Wood^{†}	3,281	14.17	+4.81	1st	3,281
Independent	Mark Arnott^{†}	1,481	6.40	n/a	2nd	1,757
Independent	Orphée Mickalad^{†}	1,583	6.84	n/a	2nd	1,716
Independent	Karen Naylor^{†}	1,136	4.91	n/a	41st	1,613
Independent	Rachel Bowen^{†}	1,169	5.05	−2.36	44th	1,583
Independent	Lew Findlay^{†}	1,187	5.13	n/a	48th	1,605
Independent	Vaughan Dennison^{†}	1,023	4.42	n/a	50th	1,572
Green	Brent Barrett^{†}	1,196	5.16	−2.01	50th	1,563
Independent	Hayden Fitzgerald	645	2.79	(new)	64th	1,800
Labour	Lorna Johnson^{†}	1,096	4.73	n/a	65th	1,528
Independent	Billy Meehan^{†}	604	2.61	n/a	66th	1,571
Independent	Leonie Hapeta^{†}	578	2.50	n/a	67th	1,518
Independent	Kaydee Jean Zabelin^{†}	895	3.86	n/a	80th	1,492
Labour	Zulfiqar Butt	837	3.61	n/a	80th	1,434
ACT Local	Glen Williams	696	3.01	(new)	63th	1,201
Independent	Jackie Wheeler	631	2.72	(new)	56th	1,051
Independent	Mark Gunning	525	2.27	(new)	47th	795
Independent	Caleb Riddick	512	2.21	(new)	45th	732
Independent	Jeremy Craig Hoskins	475	2.05	(new)	42nd	584
Independent	Verne Wilson	397	1.71	(new)	40th	530
Independent	Nelson Harper	315	1.36	(new)	38th	438
Independent	Wajeha Akbaryan	328	1.42	(new)	36th	422
Independent	Richard Woolgar	226	0.98	(new)	31st	297
Independent	Eldhose Poovathumveettil Mathew	201	0.87	(new)	30th	235
Independent	Melanie Butler	150	0.65	n/a	29th	228
Independent	Kayne John Dunlop	183	0.79	(new)	26th	219
Independent	Dave Salisbury	149	0.64	(new)	22nd	204
Independent	Tobias Wilson Nash	132	0.57	(new)	20th	175
Independent	Cameron Jenkins	130	0.56	(new)	19th	141
Independent	Dave Poppelwell	110	0.47	(new)	18th	134
Independent	Quintin McGregor	115	0.50	(new)	16th	131
Independent	Adrian Phillips	113	0.49	(new)	13th	121
Independent	Eric Judd	90	0.39	(new)	11th	99
Independent	Atif Rahim	93	0.40	n/a	10th	97
Independent	Michael Paul Strachan	90	0.39	(new)	7th	95
Independent	Jack Koh	78	0.34	(new)	4th	84
Independent	Zakk Rokkanno	9	0.04	n/a	3rd	11
Quota		1,604	6.93	+0.00		
Informal votes		477	2.06	−4.37		
Blank votes		222	0.96	+0.44		
Turnout		23,158	42.70	+4.10		
Registered electors		54,228				
Independent hold on 1st iteration						
Independent hold on 2nd iteration						
Independent hold on 2nd iteration						
Independent hold on 41st iteration						
Independent hold on 44th iteration						
Independent hold on 48th iteration						
Independent hold on 50th iteration						
Green hold on 50th iteration						
Independent gain from Independent on 64th iteration						
Labour hold on 65th iteration						
Independent hold on 66th iteration						
Independent hold on 67th iteration						
Independent hold on 80th iteration						
^{†} incumbent

==== Te Pūao Māori ward ====
2025 Te Pūao Māori ward election
Party	Candidate	Primary votes	%	±%	Iteration	
Party	Candidate	Primary votes	%	±%	#	Votes
Te Pāti Māori	Debi Marshall-Lobb^{†}	1,087	57.15	n/a	1st	1,087
Independent	Bonnie Kuru	547	28.76	(new)	2nd	803
Independent	Rowland Prince Fitzgerald^{†}	209	10.99	n/a	2nd	358
Quota		614	32.28	n/a		
Informal votes		27	1.42	n/a		
Blank votes		32	1.68	n/a		
Turnout		1,902	36.23	n/a		
Registered electors		5,250				
Te Pāti Māori gain from Rangitāne o Manawatū on 1st iteration						
Independent gain from Rangitāne o Manawatū on 2nd iteration						
^{†} incumbent

=== Māori wards poll ===
Choice	Votes	%
I vote to KEEP Māori wards	13,373	55.51
I vote to REMOVE Māori wards	10,718	44.49
Total	24,091	100.00
Valid votes	24,091	96.13
Invalid/blank votes	969	3.87
Total votes	25,060	100.00

== See also ==
- 2025 Whanganui District Council election
