= Gordon Brown (businessman) =

New Zealand businessman and politician (1907–1982)

Gordon Brown OBE

Deputy Mayor of Palmerston North
- In office 1974–1976

Personal details
- Born: Gordon Alexander Brown; 28 November 1907 Turakina, New Zealand
- Died: 16 July 1982 (aged 74) Palmerston North, New Zealand

Gordon Alexander Brown OBE (28 November 1907 – 16 July 1982) was a New Zealand accountant, co-operative retail manager, businessman, rugby administrator and local politician. He was elected to the Palmerston North City Council in 1968 and served as deputy mayor from 1974 to 1976. He was born in Turakina, New Zealand, on 28 November 1907.

In the 1975 New Year Honours, Brown was appointed an Officer of the Order of the British Empire, for services to the community.
