= Kuini Te Tau =

Ngai Tahu leader, welfare worker, community leader (1899–1998)

Katarina Kuini Whare-rau-aruhe Te Tau BEM (née Ellison; 29 December 1899 – 8 March 1998) was a notable New Zealand tribal leader, welfare worker and community leader. Of Māori descent, she identified with the Ngāi Tahu iwi. She was born in Puketeraki, near Karitane, Otago, New Zealand, in 1899.

In the 1975 New Year Honours, Te Tau was awarded the British Empire Medal, for services to the community. She received the New Zealand Suffrage Centennial Medal in 1993.
