= St Alban's Church, Pauatahanui =

St Alban's Church
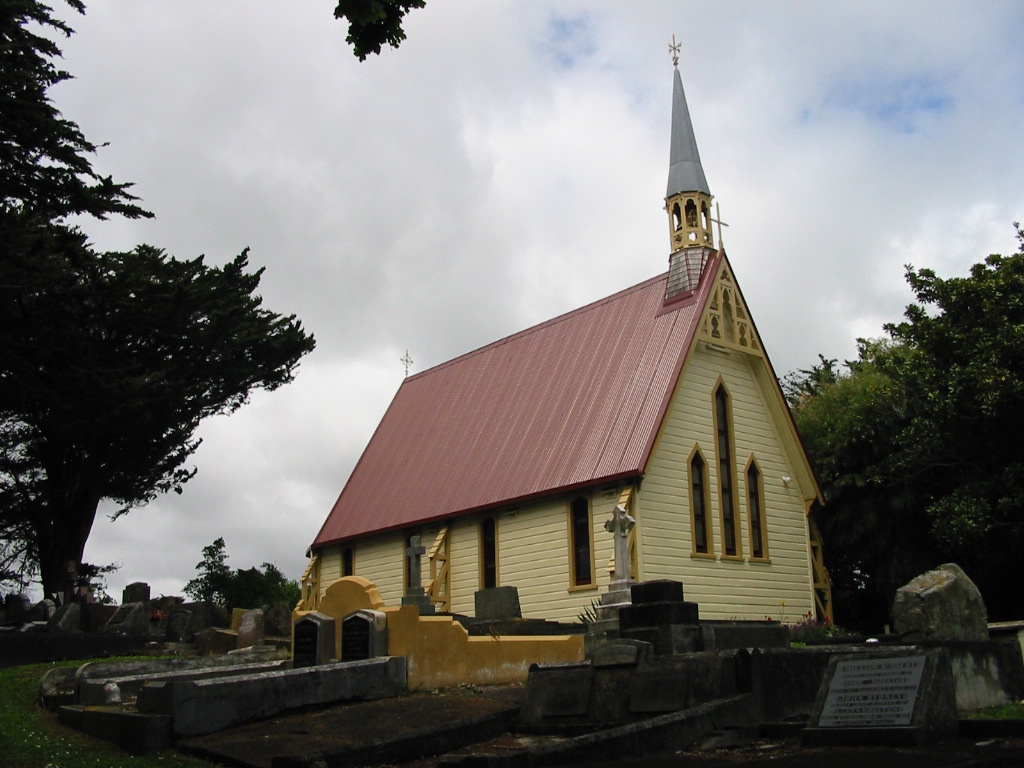
- St Alban's Church
- St Alban's Church
- 41°6′25″S 174°55′4″E
- Address: 4 Paekakariki Hill Road, Pāuatahanui, Porirua
- Country: New Zealand
- Denomination: Anglican
- Website: www.pauanglican.org.nz

History
- Status: Church
- Dedicated: 1898

Architecture
- Architect(s): Clere, Fitzgerald, Richmond
- Architectural type: Church
- Style: Gothic Revival
- Years built: 1895-1898

Administration
- Province: Anglican Church in Aotearoa, New Zealand and Polynesia
- Diocese: Wellington
- Parish: Pāuatahanui

Clergy
- Vicar: Dan Ross

Heritage New Zealand – Category 2
- Designated: 6 June 1983
- Reference no.: 1320

St Alban's Church is an heritage-listed Anglican church located in Pāuatahanui, Porirua, New Zealand.

== History ==
Built in 1898 and designed by Frederick de Jersey Clere in the Gothic Revival style, the current church is the second church to be built in Pāuatahanui. The church was listed in 1983 by Heritage New Zealand as a Category 2 historic place.

The building is on the old site of the Matai Paua pā, that was built by Te Rangihaeata, the Ngāti Toa leader in 1846.
