= Jill White =

New Zealand Labour Party politician

Jill White MNZM JP
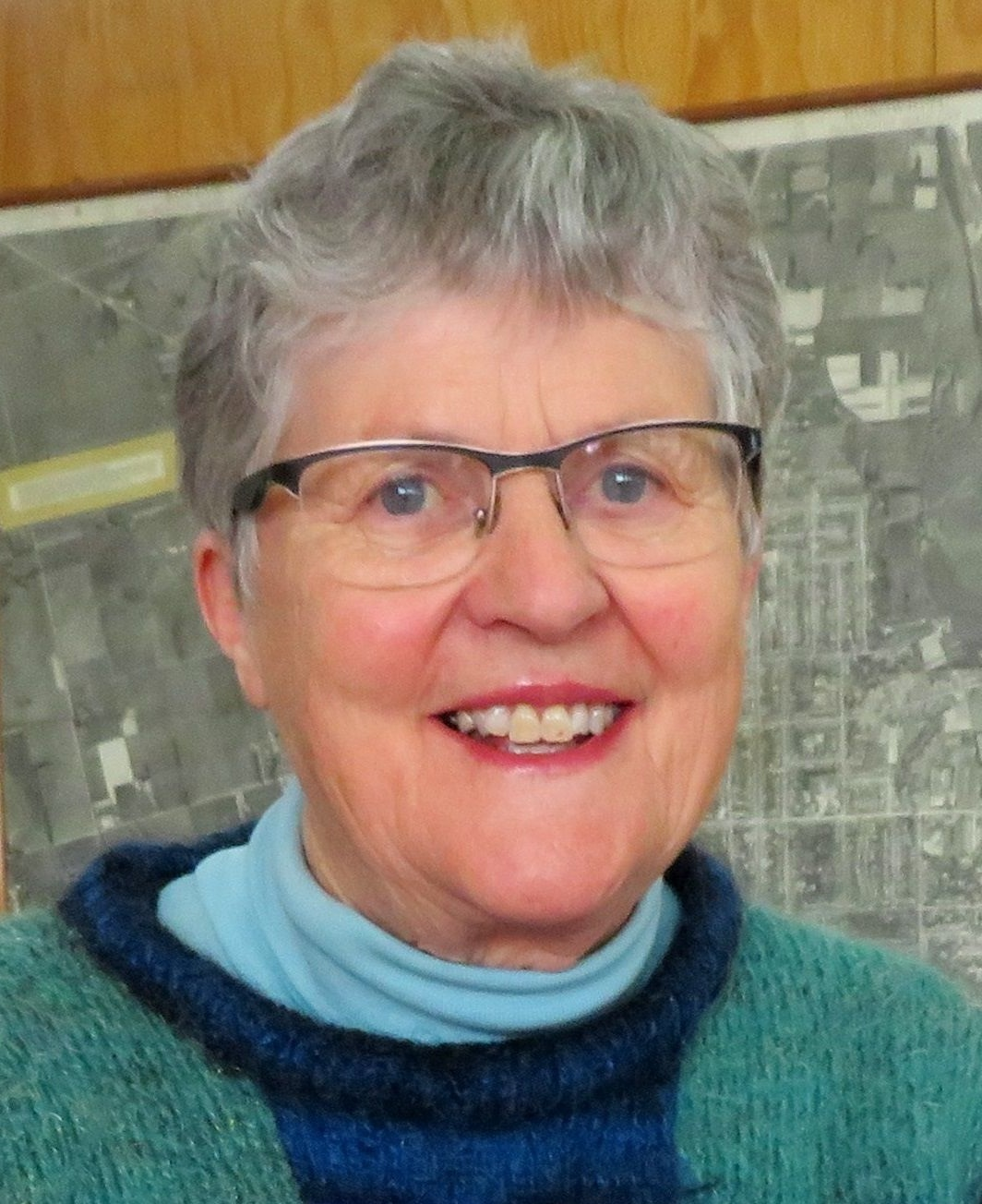
- White in 2018

Member of the New Zealand Parliament for Manawatu
- In office 6 November 1993 – 12 October 1996
- Preceded by: Hamish MacIntyre
- Succeeded by: constituency abolished

Member of the New Zealand Parliament for Labour party list
- In office 12 October 1996 – 19 November 1998
- Succeeded by: Helen Duncan (Note: Normally, list MPs do not have individual predecessors or successors, but White resigned during a sitting parliament and therefore was succeeded by Duncan.)

25th Mayor of Palmerston North
- In office 10 October 1998 – 13 October 2001
- Preceded by: Paul Rieger
- Succeeded by: Mark Bell-Booth

Personal details
- Born: 22 February 1941 (age 85) Feilding, New Zealand
- Party: Labour Party (1990–present)
- Profession: Teacher; nurse

Jacqueline Jill White MNZM JP (born 22 February 1941) is a former New Zealand Labour Party politician, and a registered nurse.

== Early life and career ==
White was born in Feilding in 1941. She attended Manchester Street Primary School and Feilding Agricultural High School before attending Victoria University of Wellington where she gained a Bachelor of Science and then Canterbury Teachers' College. She later completed a Master of Arts at Massey University.

She first worked as a secondary school teacher in New Zealand from 1965, and later Samoa via Volunteer Service Abroad, before becoming a nurse in 1972. White also worked in the United Kingdom as a nurse before returning to New Zealand in 1979 where she became a community and public nurse before retiring in 1988.

== Local-body politics ==
White was a councillor on Palmerston North City Council from 1983 to 1992. This was followed by some years in Parliament, a role from which she resigned in 1998 to become Mayor of Palmerston North. She held that post until 2001. She was the first woman to hold the position. In 1989, she was elected a member of the Manawatu-Wanganui Regional Council, remaining a member until 1994 when she resigned. She was later a Horizons Regional Councillor from 2007 until 2013.

White's community involvement was with the Girl Guides, District Committee for the Prevention of Child Abuse and the National Council of Women.

In the 2000 Queen's Birthday Honours, White was appointed a Member of the New Zealand Order of Merit, for services to local-body and community affairs.

== Member of Parliament ==
New Zealand Parliament
| Years | Term | Electorate | List | Party |
|---|---|---|---|---|
| 1993–1996 | 44th | Manawatu | | Labour |
| 1996–1998 | 45th | List | 9 | Labour |

From 1993 to 1998, she was a member of Parliament for the Labour Party, first as MP for Manawatu and then as a list MP. In 1996, she had stood in Rangitīkei unsuccessfully.

== Notes ==
New Zealand Parliament
| Preceded by Hamish MacIntyre | Member of Parliament for Manawatu; 1993–1996 | Constituency abolished |
Political offices
| Preceded by Paul Rieger | Mayor of Palmerston North; 1998–2001 | Succeeded by Mark Bell-Booth |
