= Heather Tanguay =

New Zealand mayor

Heather Tanguay QSO JP
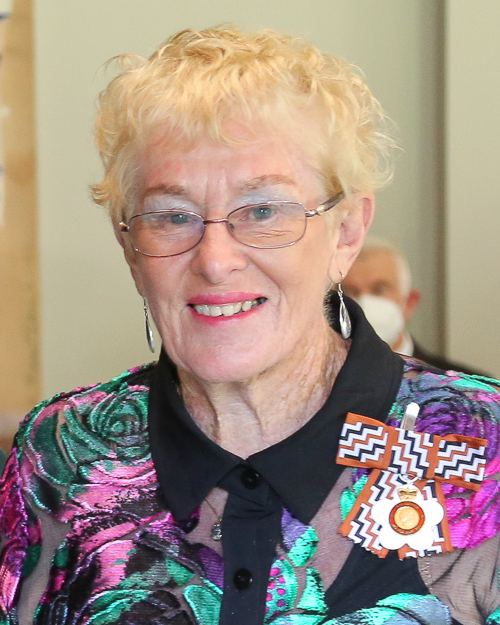
- Tanguay in 2022

27th Mayor of Palmerston North
- In office 2004–2007
- Preceded by: Mark Bell-Booth
- Succeeded by: Jono Naylor

Personal details
- Born: Heather Leigh Black; 17 September 1944 (age 82) Napier, New Zealand
- Party: Labour

Heather Leigh Tanguay QSO JP (née Black; born 17 September 1944) is a New Zealand politician who served for twelve years on the Palmerston North City Council, being Mayor from 2004 to 2007. She takes a leading role in the community, has served in many official positions and received national awards for taking the lead in initiating social programmes to build diversity and support those who are disadvantaged.

== Early life and family ==
Tanguay was born in Napier on 17 September 1944, the daughter of Marjory Emily Black (née Bell) and Gavin Charles "Charlie" Black, and was educated at Napier Girls' High School. She married Jerry Harry Tanguay, and the couple had three children, moving from Masterton to Manawatu in 1987.

Tanguay's oldest child, Gavin, has followed in her political footsteps by being elected on to the Troms and Finnmark county council in the 2019 Norwegian election.

== Political career ==
Tanguay served a total of twelve years for Palmerston North City Council, becoming Mayor in 2004 when she defeated incumbent Mark Bell-Booth. During her mayoralty, Palmerston North City Council signed the contract with Mighty River Power for the proposed Turitea Wind Farm. Tanguay has said she is "unrepentant" for supporting this because [while] "wind farms are contentious and yes, there have been mechanical problems that have made it difficult for the people living near to them, but if I had my time again I certainly would support them again. I always believed there were more in favour than there weren't."

Reflecting on her time as a councillor, Tanguay has said there was a bullying culture in the council at the time, and this plus her socialist beliefs and positions on social issues made the years challenging for her. She recalled that her stance on tighter gun controls during a heated debate within a council chamber "full of gun owners" in 1996, led to her receiving a threat in the post. In the 2007 campaign, her signs were vandalised and she was accused of being unfit to lead Palmerston North because she was not a Christian and this ultimately led to her decision not to stand for re-election in 2010.

At the elections in 2007, she was beaten by Jono Naylor with 12524 to 8088 votes, but continued as a councillor and in 2008, opened a 32-kilometre section of the national Te Araroa trail. When unveiling the sign, Tanguay acknowledged the efforts of Te Araroa Manawatu Trust in completing the work.

She considered contesting the 2010 mayoralty, but did not put her name forward in the end.

== Formal community positions ==
In 1987, Tanguay was appointed as a justice of the peace. She was a trustee of the Charities Commission from 2004 to 2009, and is a trustee of the Manawatū section of Te Araroa. As of 2010, she was employed by the Department of Internal Affairs. In 2019 she stood down from her position on the Lottery Oranga Marae Committee, and was thanked by Nanaia Mahuta, the then Minister for Maori Development.

== Community initiatives ==
=== Palmerston North ===
While living in Palmerston North, Tanguay is credited with establishing the Ethkick football tournaments, which had the specific aim of "promoting diversity and intercultural friendship." Soon after moving to the area, Tanguay took on the role as head of Palmerston North's Red Cross, became involved with community issues and set up a network of social activists that met most Sundays in her home. When this group asked her to represent them, her political career began when she ran for the Palmerston North City Council in 1995. Tanguay and her husband moved to Auckland in 2013 to be close to their daughters and grandchildren. She recalls that the shift to Auckland was "tinged with the same excitement" they had when moving from Masterton to Manawatu in 1987, but that they had "no intention of retiring" when they got to Auckland.

=== Auckland ===
In Auckland, Tanguay established the Glen Eden Residents Association. In 2016, building on the work she had done in Palmerston North, she organised the Ethkick West football tournament, noting: "It's not just a football tournament, it's a celebration of diversity in the west. Everybody can play out there together and build a bridge between their communities."

In 2018, Tanguay took a lead role in establishing three free roadside pantries in Glen Eden as a part of the Pataka Kai (food pantry) movement. Local Board member, Greg Presland noted that the initiative is [a] "resident-led, grassroots, crowdsourced solution to helping locals that are in need..[while]..at the same time, it builds and strengthens community."

A 2018 petition, organised by Tanguay, entitled 'To save our precious waterways', was presented to the New Zealand House of Representatives. The response was [that] "currently, the Minister of Local Government is leading a cross-agency review of New Zealand’s three waters system—drinking water, stormwater, and wastewater...[and]...we note that the scope of the review includes the concerns raised by the petitioner."

Over the course of eight years between 2013 and 2021, Tanguay and her husband Jerry have restored the Milan Bush Reserve through founding the association 'Friends of Milan Reserve'. Initiatives have included native vegetation planting, pest trapping, stream restoration, rubbish removal, and the installation of paths with botanical signs. Their efforts won them the RĀTĀ AWARD at the 2020 Ecomatters Love Your Place Awards.

Tanguay is president of local charity 'Give a Kid a Blanket', which provides warm clothing and bedding for families in need.

== Honours and awards ==
In 1990, Tanguay was awarded the New Zealand 1990 Commemoration Medal.

She was the recipient of a 2009 Harmony Award by Islam Awareness for her longstanding support of the Manawatu Muslim community.

In the 2021 Queen's Birthday Honours, Tanguay was appointed a Companion of the Queen's Service Order, for services to local government and the community.

Political offices
Preceded by Mark Bell-Booth	Mayor of Palmerston North; 2004–2007	Succeeded by Jono Naylor
