= Helen Duncan (politician) =

New Zealand politician (1941–2007)

Helen Duncan MNZM

Member of the New Zealand Parliament for Labour party list
- In office 24 November 1998 – 17 September 2005
- Preceded by: Jill White (Note: Normally, list MPs do not have individual predecessors or successors, but White resigned during a sitting parliament and therefore was succeeded by Duncan.)

Personal details
- Born: 1941 Greymouth, New Zealand
- Died: 6 February 2007 (aged 65)
- Party: Labour Party
- Education: University of Auckland; University of Canterbury; Christchurch Teachers' College

Helen Patricia Duncan MNZM (7 November 1941 – 6 February 2007) was a New Zealand politician and a member of the Labour Party.

== Early years ==
Duncan was born in Greymouth on the West Coast, and attended the University of Canterbury, the University of Auckland, and Christchurch Teachers' College. She worked as a teacher in a number of different cities including Lower Hutt, Masterton and Auckland. She was involved with the New Zealand Educational Institute (Te Riu Roa) and the New Zealand Council of Trade Unions.

== Member of Parliament ==
New Zealand Parliament
Years	Term	Electorate	List	Party
1998–1999	45th	List	22	Labour
1999–2002	46th	List	30	Labour
2002–2005	47th	List	30	Labour

She first stood for Parliament in the 1996 election, unsuccessfully in the Auckland electorate of Epsom for the Labour Party.

In 1998 Jill White, a Labour list MP, resigned from Parliament. As Duncan was the next-ranked person on the Labour Party list, she entered Parliament in White's place.

In the 1999 and the 2002 elections, Duncan remained in Parliament as a list MP, also unsuccessfully contesting the North Shore electorate.

She left Parliament at the 2005 election after being diagnosed with cancer. She died on 6 February 2007.

In the 2005 Queen's Birthday Honours, Duncan was appointed a Member of the New Zealand Order of Merit, for public services.
