= Muriel Barron =

New Zealand religious sister and pharmacist

Sister Mary Gabriel MBE (21 June 1904 – 29 February 1988), whose birth name was Muriel Marie Barron, was a New Zealand religious sister and pharmacist.

== Background ==
Barron was born in Waihi in 1904 to George and Margaret Barron, she was educated at Waihi High School and Waihi School of Mines. She later apprenticed in pharmacy with her father. She was named a Member of the Pharmaceutical Society (MPS) in 1925.

== Religious life ==
She joined the Sisters of Mercy in 1929 in Auckland and having previously studied music teaching. She took her religious vows three years later, taking the name Sister Mary Gabriel. She taught music at Otahuhu Convent from 1933 to 1937.

== Pharmacist ==
She founded the pharmacy at the Mater Misericordiae Hospital (now Mercy Hospital) in 1937 and served as its primary pharmacist from 1937 until 1975, when she retired. During that time she was a foundation member of the New Zealand Hospital Pharmacists' Association and of Auckland branch of the Pharmaceutical Society. She was one of the first New Zealand pharmacists to be made a Fellow of the Pharmaceutical Society and the first New Zealand woman to be made a Fellow of the Pharmaceutical Society.

== Death ==
She died on 29 February 1988, aged 83.

== Affiliations/Honours ==
- Foundation member, New Zealand Hospital Pharmacists' Association
- Member, Auckland Branch of the Pharmaceutical Society
- Fellow of the Pharmaceutical Society in New Zealand
- In the 1975 New Year Honours, she was appointed a Member of the Order of the British Empire, for services to the community.
