= Louisa Snelson =

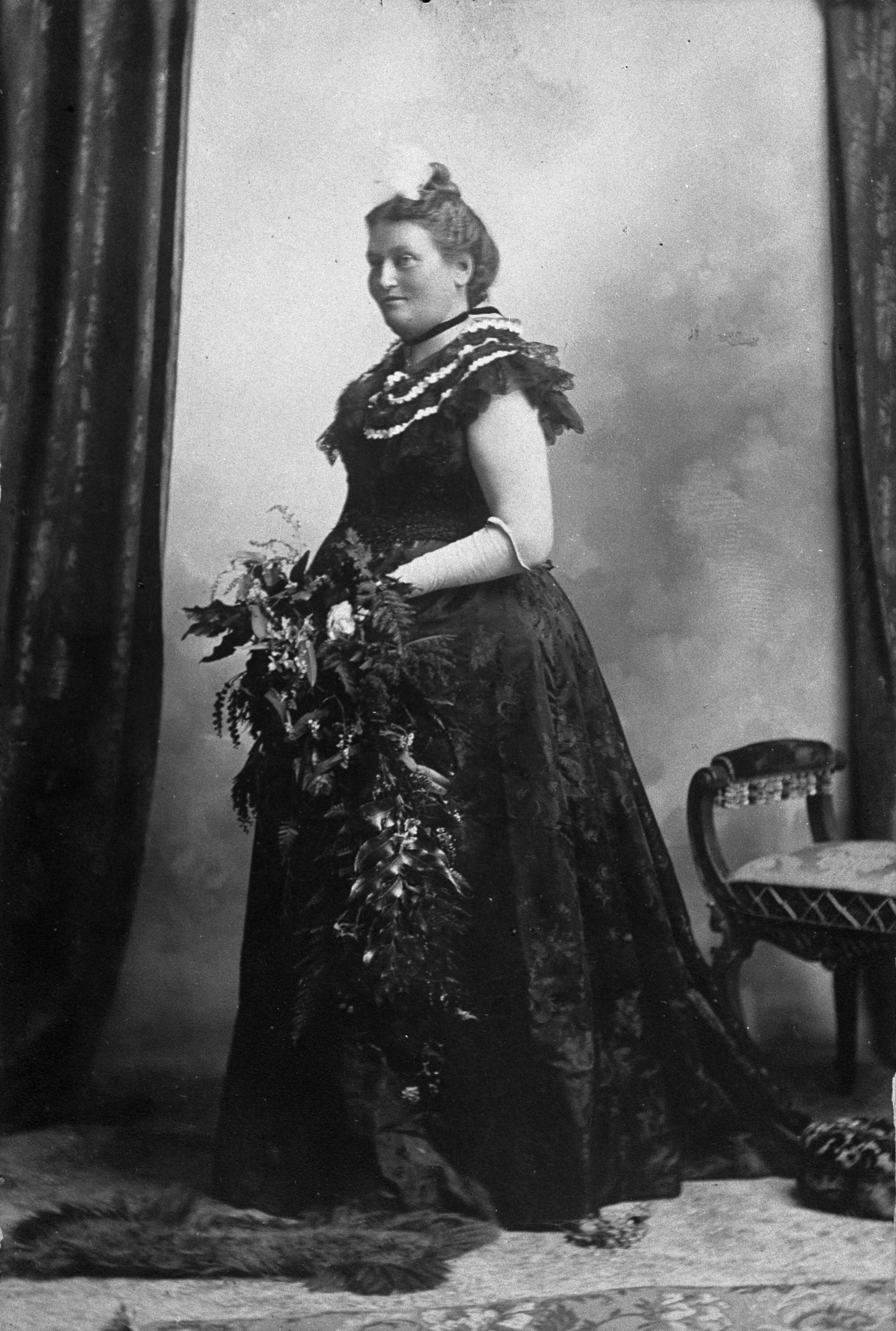
- Born: Louisa Matilda Buck; 29 January 1844; Wellington, New Zealand
- Died: 15 December 1919 (aged 75); Whanganui, New Zealand
- Known for: Community leader
- Spouse: George Snelson (m. 1865; died 1901)
- Children: Two (both died in infancy)

Louisa Matilda Snelson (née Buck, 29 January 1844 – 15 December 1919) was a New Zealand civic leader. She and her husband George Snelson were considered the "father and mother of Palmerston North".

== Biography ==
Louisa Buck’s parents (Elizabeth Frances and Henry Gregory Buck, a blacksmith) and siblings arrived in New Zealand in March 1842 on board the ship Birman. Louisa was born in Wellington on 29 January 1844 and grew up there. She met and married George Snelson in 1865, and the couple lived in Wellington for the first years of their marriage. They had two children: Frances Mary Halford in 1866 and George James Halford in 1868, however both died during infancy. Frances died at a few months old, and George was three years old.

In 1871, Snelson relocated to Palmerston North to join her husband, who had gone there the previous year to open a general store and ironmongery. She took with her the couple's ward, Matilda Montgomery, who was 16 years old at the time. As well as working in the store, Snelson provided a letter-writing service for the newly arrived Scandinavian settlers in the district, took in boarders and cared for children in her home.

As the town grew, Snelson became involved in church initiatives – from October 1872, the Snelsons' home and store were used for Anglican church services and on 29 September 1875 Snelson laid the foundation stone for All Saints' Church, the first Anglican church in the town. From 1877 Snelson was Sunday school teacher at the church, and she also developed close relationships with Christian Māori at Awapuni.

Snelson later led a fund-raising campaign to open a public hospital, which culminated in the opening of the facility on 21 November 1893. Around 1890 she also began a petition, and then a fundraising campaign, to erect a statue of Rangitāne chief Te Peeti Te Aweawe. Snelson was invited to unveil the statue in The Square in Palmerston North in 1907.

After Snelson's husband died in 1901, she struggled financially and in 1903 she sold her home and moved to Sydney, Australia. When she returned to Palmerston North a few years later she earned money by selling paintings and giving art lessons. However, during World War I, she was also busy with patriotic projects such as organising donations of socks, stockings and mittens for Belgian war widows and supporting the local Patriotic Shop and the All Saint’s Children’s Home.

Louisa Snelson died in Whanganui on 15 December 1919, and she was buried at Terrace End Cemetery, Palmerston North.
