= Mark Bell-Booth =

New Zealand mayor

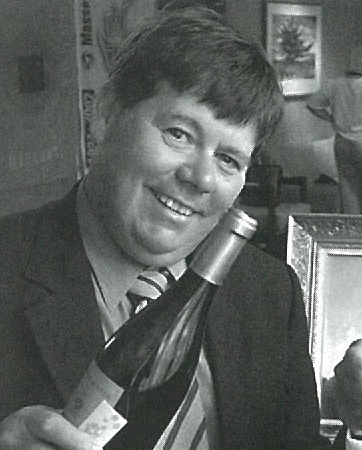
- Bell-Booth in 2002

26th Mayor of Palmerston North
- In office 2001–2004
- Preceded by: Jill White
- Succeeded by: Heather Tanguay

Mark Rex Bell-Booth was mayor of Palmerston North for one term, from 2001 to 2004.

He became known through his "Save the Avenue" campaign. He is best known for the redevelopment of The Square, which happened during his mayoralty. In the 2004 local elections he lost the mayoralty to Heather Tanguay. He made headlines when it became known that he lent his wife's car to a known gang member. His time at the council was described by a political commentator as being more akin to that of a chief executive than a mayor. He contested the mayoralty again in the 2010 local elections and came a distant second against incumbent Jono Naylor, with 2,229 votes against 16,717.

From 2004 to 2008 Bell-Booth was chief executive of Assetta, a software development company. Since then he has been a director of Unlimited Realities, a designer of touchscreen software applications.

Political offices
Preceded by Jill White	Mayor of Palmerston North; 2001–2004	Succeeded by Heather Tanguay
