= 1975 New Year Honours (New Zealand) =

Annual awards for New Zealanders

The 1975 New Year Honours in New Zealand were appointments by Elizabeth II on the advice of the New Zealand government to various orders and honours to reward and highlight good works by New Zealanders. The awards celebrated the passing of 1974 and the beginning of 1975, and were announced on 1 January 1975.

The recipients of honours are displayed here as they were styled before their new honour.

== Knight Bachelor ==
- William Norman Gough Dunlop JP – of Christchurch. For services to the farming industry.
- Leonard Albert Hadley JP – of Wellington. For services to the trade union movement.

== Order of the Bath ==
=== Companion (CB) ===
Civil division

- Ian Gordon Lythgoe – chairman of the State Services Commission, 1970–1974.

== Order of Saint Michael and Saint George ==
=== Companion (CMG) ===
- Arthur Ernest Bockett OBE – commissioner of the Waterfront Industry Commission.
- John Patrick McVeagh – of Lower Hutt; Chief Parliamentary Counsel.

== Order of the British Empire ==
=== Dame Commander (DBE) ===
Civil division

- Lucy Ruth Kirk – widow of the Right Honourable Norman Eric Kirk MP, late Prime Minister of New Zealand. For public services.

=== Knight Commander (KBE) ===
Civil division

- Peter Tait OBE JP – of Napier. For services to local government.

=== Commander (CBE) ===
Civil division

- Laurence Alfred Cameron JP – of Lower Hutt. For services to commerce and the community.
- Miriam Patricia Dell – of Wellington. For public services.
- Robert James MacLachlan – Director-General of Lands, 1962–1974.
- Stanley William Wilford Tong – of Auckland. For services to the legal profession and civic affairs.
- Pearce Melvin Eddy Williams OBE JP – of Kaikohe. For services to the community.

Military division

- Brigadier Ronald Douglas Patrick Hassett MBE – Assistant Chief of Defence Staff (Policy).
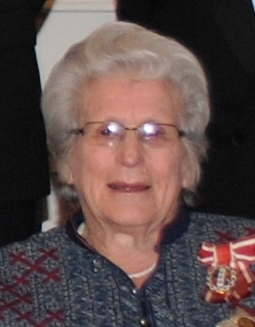
Miriam Dell

=== Officer (OBE) ===
Civil division

- John Dunstan Atkinson – of Auckland. For services to scientific research.
- Gordon Alexander Brown JP – of Palmerston North. For services to the community.
- The Reverend Father Leo St John Close – of Dunedin. For services to the paraplegic movement.
- Bevan Ernest Congdon – of Dunedin. For services to cricket.
- James Francis Duncan – professor of inorganic and theoretical chemistry, Victoria University of Wellington.
- Maurice Francis Tancred Holmes – of Christchurch. For services to New Zealand trotting.
- Sheila Betty Holt JP – of Auckland. For services to the community.
- Donald Ross Hunter – of Dunedin, For services to the Otago Council and the community.
- The Reverend George Alfred Jeffreys – of Auckland. For services to youth and the community.
- Reginald David Lumsden – of Wellington. For services to the Industrial Court.
- Norman Alfred Nash – of Palmerston North. For services to the newspaper and printing industry and community.
- Eunice Olive Nieukerke – of Auckland. For services to education and the community.
- John Goodlet Pryde – of Wellington. For services to the farming industry.
- John Russell Ritchie – of Dunedin. For services to medicine.
- James Malcolm Ross – of Lower Hutt. For services to sport, especially smallbore rifle shooting.
- The Reverend Ernest James Salisbury – of Shaba, Zaire. For humanitarian services.

Military division

- Surgeon Commander Thomas Shailer Weston VRD – Royal New Zealand Naval Volunteer Reserve.
- Lieutenant Colonel Robert McLeod Dickie – Royal New Zealand Engineers (Regular Force).
- Lieutenant Colonel Neville Alan Wallace – Royal New Zealand Infantry Regiment (Territorial Force).
- Group Captain Morris Charles Pollard – Royal New Zealand Air Force.
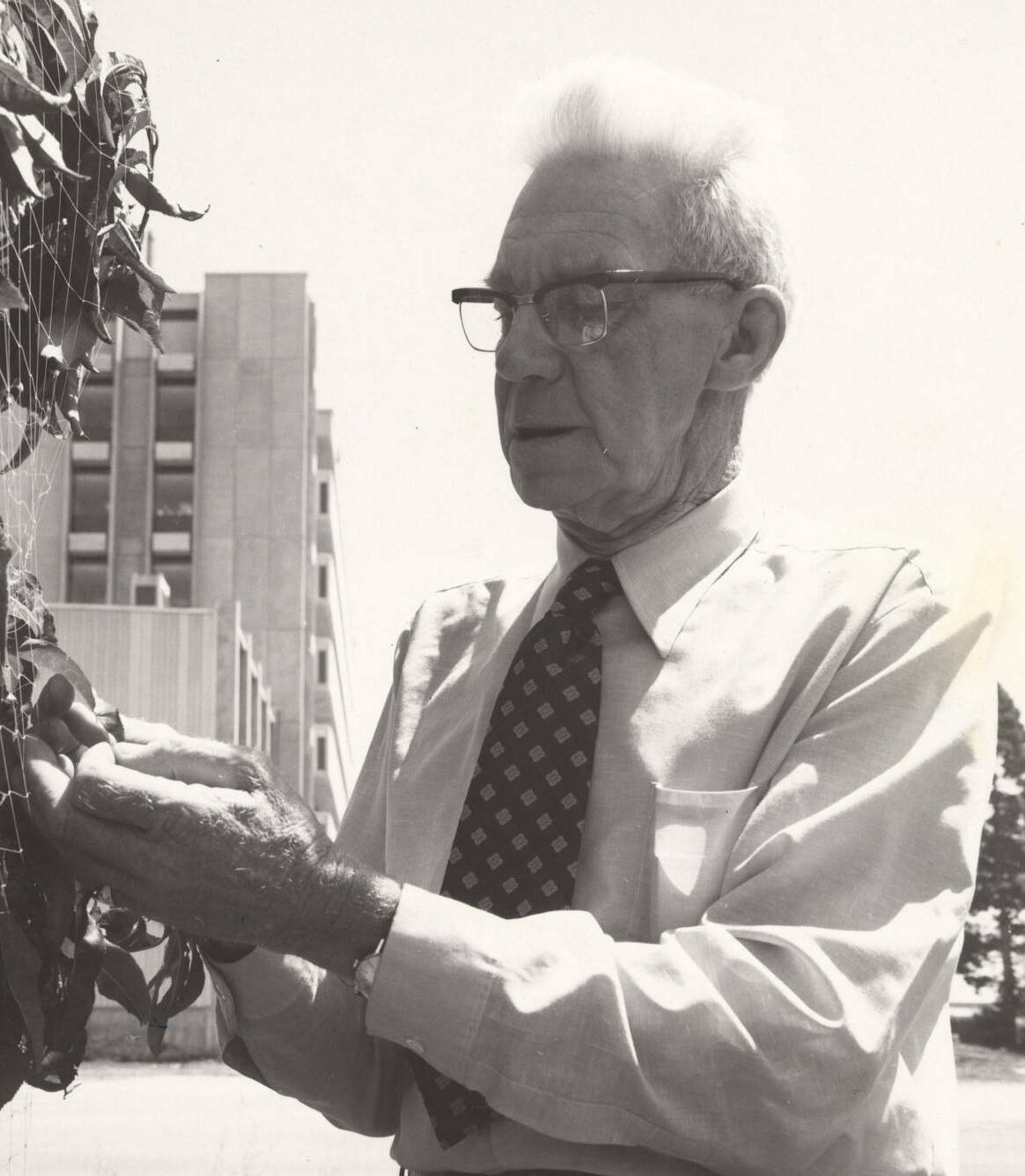
Torchy Atkinson

=== Member (MBE) ===
Civil division

- Muriel Barron (Sister Mary Gabriel) – of Auckland. For services to the community.
- Desmond Terence Crowe – of Timaru. For services to the community.
- William Wallis Day JP – of Palmerston North. For services to local government.
- Patrick Ballance Desmond – of Palmerston North. For services to the dairy industry.
- Pieter Johannes De Vries – of Karamea. For exemplary devotion to duty as a patrolman on the Heaphy Track.
- Mary Frances English – of Auckland. For services to Guiding.
- Binda Mary Goldsbrough – of Christchurch. For services to physically handicapped children.
- Frances Eva Boronia Gregory – of Gisborne. For services to the community and local government.
- Councillor Leonard Robert George Harlen QFSM – of Hastings. For services to the Fire Brigade.
- Hugh Wilson Hayward JP – of Ngatea. For services to the community and local government.
- James Frederick Higgins JP – of Tokoroa. For services to local government and the community.
- Florence Caroline Emily Howland – of Pukerua Bay. For services to social welfare.
- Lewis Evan Lewis – of South Auckland. For services to education.
- Bruce McHattie – of Auckland. For services to the deaf.
- Rona Una McKenzie – of Auckland. For services to women's cricket.
- Norma Mangos – of Nelson. For services to the New Zealand Marching Association.
- John Patrick Murphy – of Marlborough. For services to the community.
- Beverley Pentland – of Petone. For services to the community especially fireworks safety.
- Marjorie Ellen Rae JP – of Christchurch. For services to nursing and the community.
- George Skipworth JP – of Invercargill. For services to the community
- John Rickard Waigth JP – of Roxburgh. For services to the community and local government.
- Neil Apanui Watene JP – of Petone. For services to the Māori community.
- William Frederick Wise – of Hamilton. For public services particularly with the construction of the New Zealand Chancery in Canberra.
- Clifford John Bell – lately superintendent, New Zealand Police.
- Keith Vincent – superintendent, New Zealand Police.

Military division

- Lieutenant Commander David Trevor Ingram – Royal New Zealand Navy.
- Warrant Marine Engineering Artificer Terence Richard Martin – Royal New Zealand Navy.
- Major Stewart Thomas Foster ED – Royal New Zealand Army Service Corps (Territorial Force).
- Warrant Officer First Class Lance Repington Reeves – Royal New Zealand Infantry Regiment (Regular Force).
Rona McKenzie

== Companion of the Imperial Service Order (ISO) ==
- Murray Dobson Sherwood – locomotive supervisor, New Zealand Railways.

== British Empire Medal (BEM) ==
Civil division

- Clare Martha Ambler – of Auckland. For services in local government.
- Harry Winfield Bennett JP – of Christchurch. For services to local government.
- Elizabeth Joyce Addison Birley – of Tauranga. For welfare services.
- Norman Henry Brayshaw – of Blenheim. For services to the community.
- John Drummond – of Akaroa. For services to the community.
- Russell MacLennan Glendinning – of Lumsden. For services to tourism.
- Joyce Iris Klempel – of Westland. For services to the community.
- Gladys Lorimer McAndrew – of Levin. For services to nursing.
- Howard Leon Mallitte – of Wellington. For services to youth and the Navy League Sea Cadet organisation.
- Mona Ross Moore – of Tarras. For services to the community.
- Alma Phyllis Neave JP – of Hamilton. For services to the community.
- Helga Marshall Newson – of Christchurch. For services to intellectually handicapped children.
- John Joseph O'Brien – of Sydney, Australia. For social welfare work.
- Doris Ogden – of Auckland. For services to the community.
- Edward Benjamin O'Reilly JP – of Clyde. For services to the community.
- Norman Arthur Prier – of Eastbourne. For services to the community.
- John Te Rangianiwaniwa Rangihau – of Hamilton. For services to the Māori people.
- Ellen June Sullivan JP – of New Plymouth. For services to the community.
- Kuini Katarina Ellison Te Tau – of Masterton. For services to the community.
- Lindsay Eunus Warmington – of Dargaville. For voluntary services to the community.
- Olive Charlotte Mary Wharton – of Wellington. For services to the blind.
- Kenneth Cecil Wilkinson – of Lower Hutt. For services to sport, especially table tennis.
- Eric Drayton Withell – of Nelson. For services to brass bands.
- David Skinner Paterson – lately detective sergeant, New Zealand Police.

Military division

- Chief Radioman James Drummond – Royal New Zealand Naval Volunteer Reserve.
- Chief Signalman Russell Graham Hockley – Royal New Zealand Navy.
- Chief Petty Officer Gunnery Instructor Graham Clive Holloway – Royal New Zealand Navy.
- Corporal Maxwell Harry Lyver – Royal New Zealand Infantry Regiment (Territorial Force).
- Sergeant Donald Grant Tanui Roa – Royal New Zealand Armoured Corps (Regular Force).
- Staff Sergeant Jeffrey Johnson Taylor – Royal New Zealand Army Service Corps (Regular Force).
- Flight Sergeant Air Ordnanceman Graham Brian Parcell – Royal New Zealand Air Force.
- Flight Sergeant Ronald Stanley Soden – Royal New Zealand Air Force.

== Air Force Cross (AFC) ==
- Squadron Leader Frank Hamilton Roach – Royal New Zealand Air Force.

== Queen's Fire Service Medal (QFSM) ==
- Alex Douglas Barton – chief fire officer, Dannevirke Volunteer Fire Brigade.
- John Fogarty – senior station officer, Lyttelton Volunteer Fire Brigade (Christchurch Metropolitan Fire Brigade).
- Harold Thomas Genese – chief fire officer, Tauranga United Fire Brigade.

== Queen's Police Medal (QPM) ==
- Charles Erlston Weir Black – senior sergeant, New Zealand Police.
- Michael John Vaughan – constable, New Zealand Police.
