= St Andrew's Presbyterian Church, New Plymouth =

Presbyterian church in New Plymouth, New Zealand

St Andrew's Church
- St Andrew's Church (Presbyterian)
- St Andrew's Church
- 39°03′30″S 174°04′35″E
- Location: 70-72A Liardet Street, New Plymouth
- Country: New Zealand
- Denomination: Presbyterian
- Website: St Andrew's Church

History
- Status: Church
- Founded: 1866
- Dedicated: 16 April 1932

Architecture
- Functional status: Active
- Heritage designation: Grade II Listed
- Architect: Frederick de Jersey Clere
- Style: Gothic Revival
- Years built: 1931
- Completed: 1931

Specifications
- Materials: Stone

Heritage New Zealand – Category 2
- Designated: 1 September 1983
- Reference no.: 911

St Andrew's Presbyterian Church in New Plymouth, New Zealand, designed by the architect Frederick de Jersey Clere, is a historic Presbyterian church, located on the corner of Liardet and Courtenay streets. The church, noted for its Gothic Revival architecture, is registered by Heritage New Zealand as a Category 2 Historic Place.

== History ==
The Presbyterian worship in New Plymouth started in the XIX century, with the first services being held in April 1863, initially in a chapel on Devon Street erected by the Independents and used by Rev. John Thom. The first dedicated Presbyterian church opened on 28 October 1866, also on Devon Street, at a combined cost of £1050 for the building and site. This early church was destroyed by fire in mysterious circumstances on 19 August 1882, but a replacement was built on the same site and opened on 2 March 1884. The architect was James Sanderson and the contractor was William Sands.

In 1928, at the annual meeting of the St Andrew’s Presbyterian congregation in New Plymouth, members resolved to proceed with the construction of a new Gothic-style church. The plans for this new church were prepared by the Wellington-based architect Frederick de Jersey Clere. In August 1931, the foundation stone for the new St Andrew’s Presbyterian Church at the corner of Liardet and Courtenay Streets, was laid with Masonic honours, continuing the tradition established when the original church was built. The ceremony was led by Rev. Professor William Hewitson, a distinguished Presbyterian figure known for his long ministry at Knox Church, Dunedin, and his subsequent academic leadership at Knox College, where he served as lecturer, professor, and master for two decades.

St. Andrew’s Church in New Plymouth was formally opened and dedicated on 16 April 1932 before a crowd of more than six hundred. The Highland Pipe Band marked the occasion, and the minister, Rev. J. D. McLennan Wilson, received the keys alongside Rev. Professor W. Hewitson and clerk of works W. L. Thompson. The inaugural service, led by Professor Hewitson, filled the 450 seat church beyond capacity, with many standing and more than one hundred unable to enter. Regular services began the following day, including a special children’s service conducted by Rev. Wilson. Messages of goodwill arrived from Governor General Lord Bledisloe, who expressed regret at being unable to attend, and from two former ministers, Rev. Isaac Jolly and Rev. Thomas Roseveare, linking the new church to its earlier history.

Since its completion, the church has remained largely unchanged. The only significant alteration to the original structure has been the addition of a modern entrance hall on the northern side, officially opened in November 1979. This addition provides contemporary functionality while maintaining respect for the original architectural design.

In 2021, a major $900,000 upgrade has secured the future of St Andrew’s Presbyterian Church, lifting the 1932 Gothic Revival building to about 85% of the national earthquake code through carbon‑fibre bracing concealed beneath fresh plaster and paint. This latest project followed the earlier restoration work in 2013, when $500,000 was invested in repairing stained‑glass windows, cracked walls, and the spire. Beyond worship, St Andrew’s church serves up to 26 community groups, hosting activities ranging from concerts and organ recitals to Pasifika wellness classes and blood donation sessions.

== Description ==
St Andrew's Church, designed by the architect Frederick de Jersey Clere in Gothic Revival style was built by contractors Boon Bros from New Plymouth between 1931 and 1932. The total cost of the land, building, and furnishings amounted to £12,390.

The church was built using locally sourced New Plymouth stone from Waiwhakaiho Quarry, with a combination of split-face masonry and reinforced concrete walls, featuring stained glass windows, Welsh slate roof and a tall spire. The white-finished plaster interior with oak and rimu woodwork provides the seating for approximately 500 people.

== Image gallery ==
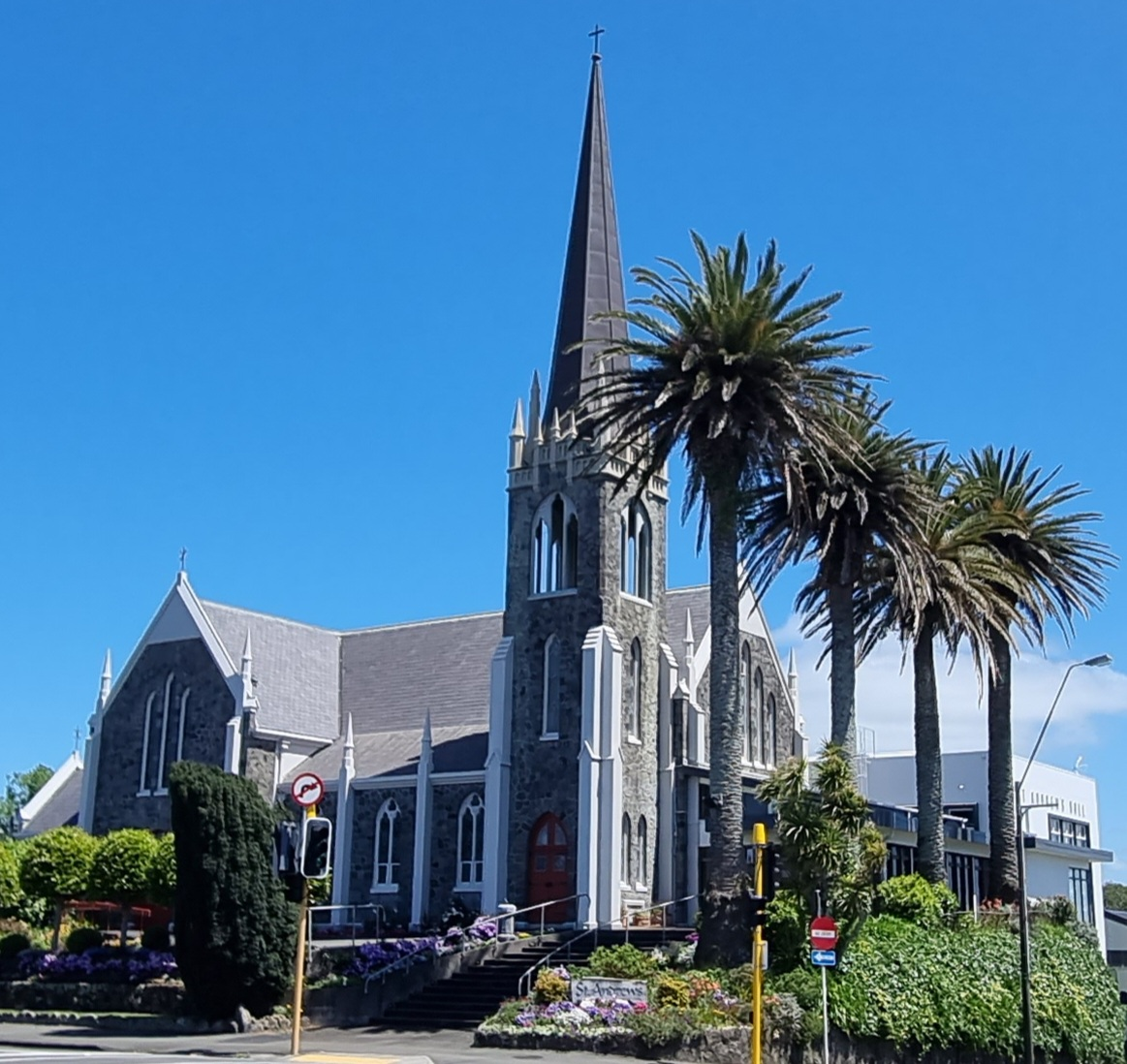
