= Tina Morgan (Paralympian) =

New Zealand Paralympian

Personal information
- Full name: Doris Heneti Morgan
- Born: c.1939
- Died: 1987

Sport
- Country: New Zealand
- Sport: Athletics, swimming
Medal record
Women's Paralympic swimming
Representing New Zealand
Paralympic Games
Bronze medal – third place	1972 Heidelberg	25m Freestyle 1B

Doris Heneti "Tina" Morgan (c. 1939 – 1987) was a New Zealand Paralympian who competed in athletics and swimming. At the 1972 Summer Paralympics, she won a bronze medal in the 25m Freestyle 1B.
