= Brian Elwood =

New Zealand politician and public servant

Sir Brian Elwood CBE JP
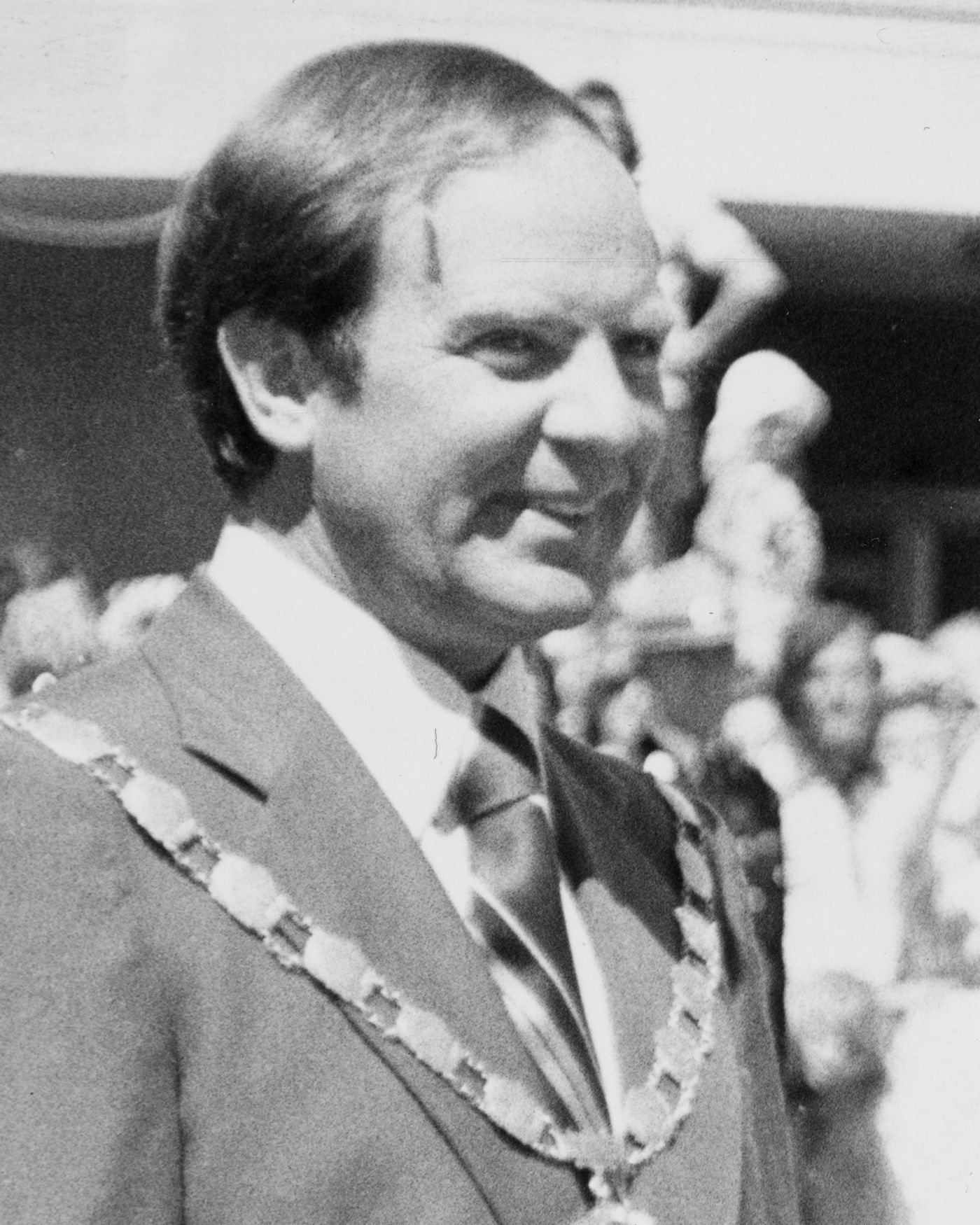
- Elwood in 1977

President of the International Ombudsman Institute
- In office 1999–2002

5th New Zealand Chief Ombudsman
- In office December 1994 – June 2003
- Preceded by: John Robertson
- Succeeded by: John Belgrave

23rd Mayor of Palmerston North
- In office 1971–1985
- Preceded by: Desmond Barry Black
- Succeeded by: Paul Rieger

Personal details
- Born: Brian George Conway Elwood; 5 April 1933 (age 93) Palmerston North, New Zealand
- Party: National Party
- Spouse: Dawn Barbara Ward (m. 1956; died 2022)
- Children: 3
- Profession: Barrister

Sir Brian George Conway Elwood CBE JP (born 5 April 1933) is a former New Zealand lawyer, politician, and public servant. He served as mayor of Palmerston North from 1971 to 1985, and was the Chief Ombudsman of New Zealand from December 1994 to June 2003. In the latter role, he was responsible for investigating complaints against central and local government agencies, including Ministers of the Crown.

== Early life and family ==
Born in Palmerston North on 5 April 1933, Elwood was educated at Palmerston North Boys' High School. He studied at Victoria University College, graduating Bachelor of Laws in 1958.

In 1956, Elwood married Dawn Barbara Ward, and the couple went on to have three children.

== Career ==
Elwood is a barrister and solicitor. He was first elected to the Palmerston North City Council in 1968 and became the mayor from 1971 to 1985. He was an executive member of the Municipal Association of New Zealand from 1974 to 1985, and president of the association from 1976 to 1979. Other positions were chairman of the Manawatu United Council, member of the Wellington Harbour Board, Commissioner for the Wellington Area Health Board and a member of the Massey University Council.

Elwood contested the Palmerston North electorate in the 1981 election for the National Party. He was defeated by Labour's Trevor de Cleene, with whom he had a long-standing rivalry.

Elwood was chairman of the Local Government Commission from 1 April 1985 to 1 November 1992. In 1989 this commission undertook a major review of local government in New Zealand. With backing from the Local Government Minister Michael Bassett, the commission reduced the number of councils from more than 800 to fewer than 100. The council decided that the new Regional councils were to be based around watersheds.

Elwood was appointed an ombudsman in November 1992, and Chief Ombudsman in December 1994, holding this position until June 2003. In 1999 he was elected President of the International Ombudsman Institute. In this role, in July 2000 he met with President Chen Shui-bian of Taiwan, discussing human rights protection. He retired from the International Ombudsman Institute in 2002. Speaking to the 9th World Conference of the International Ombudsman Institute in Stockholm in 2009, he attributed the growing acceptance of independent review of government operations to a "shift away from the primacy of nation state towards the primacy of the individual citizen and how they were to be regarded by the nation state".

In 2008 Elwood was chairman of the Waterview Connection Procurement Steering Group, reviewing the feasibility of making a proposed State Highway extension in Auckland a public/private partnership (PPP). The Steering Group's work was praised as providing a model for future PPP projects.

== Honours and awards ==
In 1977, Elwood was awarded the Queen Elizabeth II Silver Jubilee Medal. In the 1985 New Year Honours, he was appointed a Commander of the Order of the British Empire, for services to local government and the City of Palmerston North. He was made a Knight Bachelor in the 1990 New Year Honours, for services to local government. In 1990, he was also awarded the New Zealand 1990 Commemoration Medal.

Elwood was conferred an honorary Doctor of Literature degree by Massey University in 1993.

== Later life ==
Elwood was widowed by the death of his wife, Dawn, Lady Elwood, in 2022.

Government offices
Preceded by John Robertson	New Zealand Chief Ombudsman; 1994–2003	Succeeded by John Belgrave
Political offices
Preceded by Desmond Barry Black	Mayor of Palmerston North; 1971–1985	Succeeded by Paul Rieger
