= Paul Rieger =

New Zealand mayor (born 1933)

Paul Rieger QSO JP
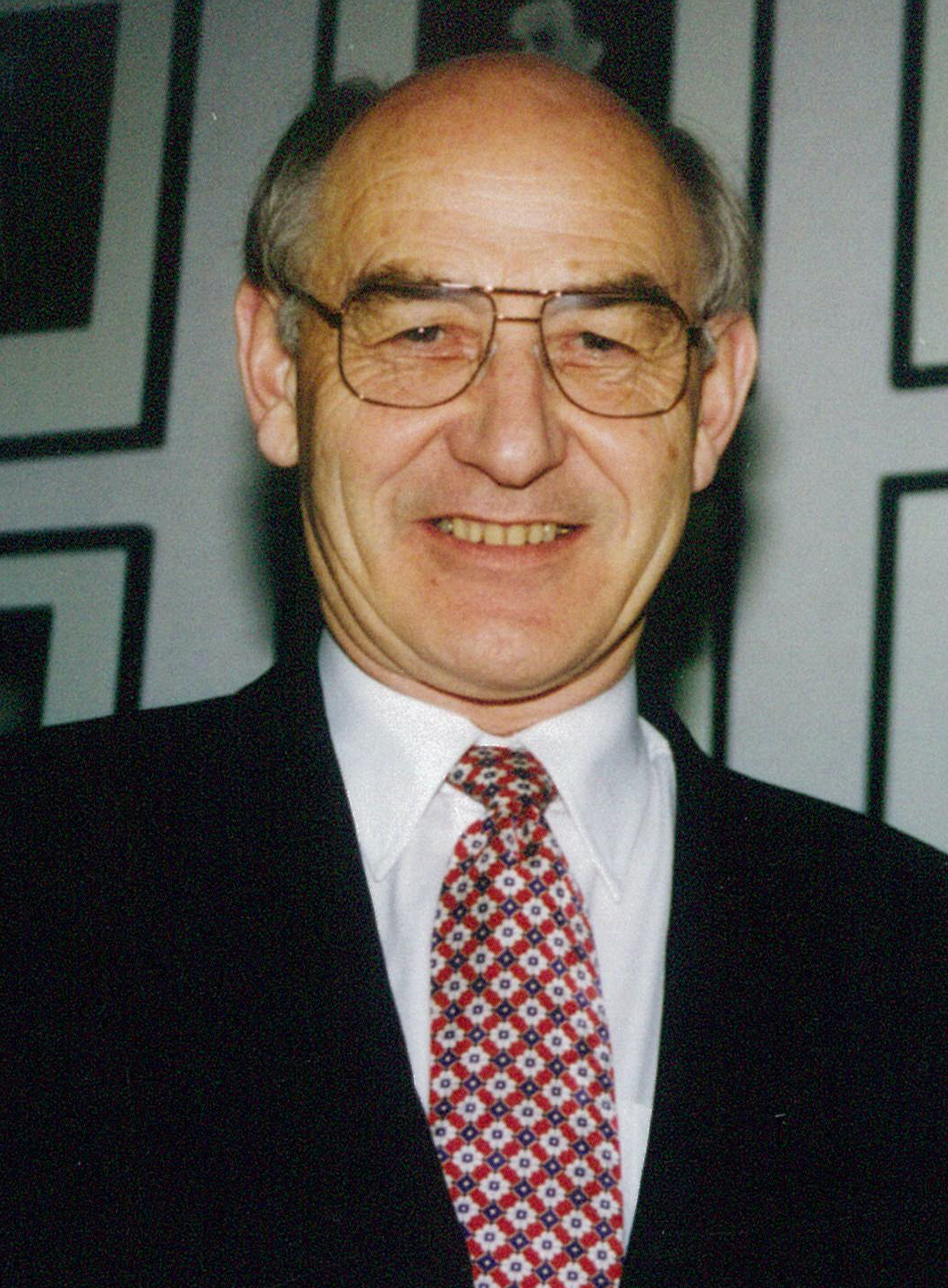
- Rieger in 1997

24th Mayor of Palmerston North
- In office 1985–1998
- Preceded by: Brian Elwood
- Succeeded by: Jill White

Personal details
- Born: Paul Warren Rieger; 15 October 1933 (age 92) Palmerston North, New Zealand

Paul Warren Rieger (born 15 October 1933) is a former New Zealand local-body politician. He served as mayor of Palmerston North from 1985 to 1998, and was a member of the Horizons Regional Council between 1998 and 2019.

Rieger served on the Council of Massey University between 1987 and 2004.

In the 1992 New Year Honours, Rieger was appointed a Companion of the Queen's Service Order for public services.

Political offices
Preceded by Brian Elwood	Mayor of Palmerston North; 1985–1998	Succeeded by Jill White
