= Mayor of Palmerston North =

- Coat of arms of Palmerston North

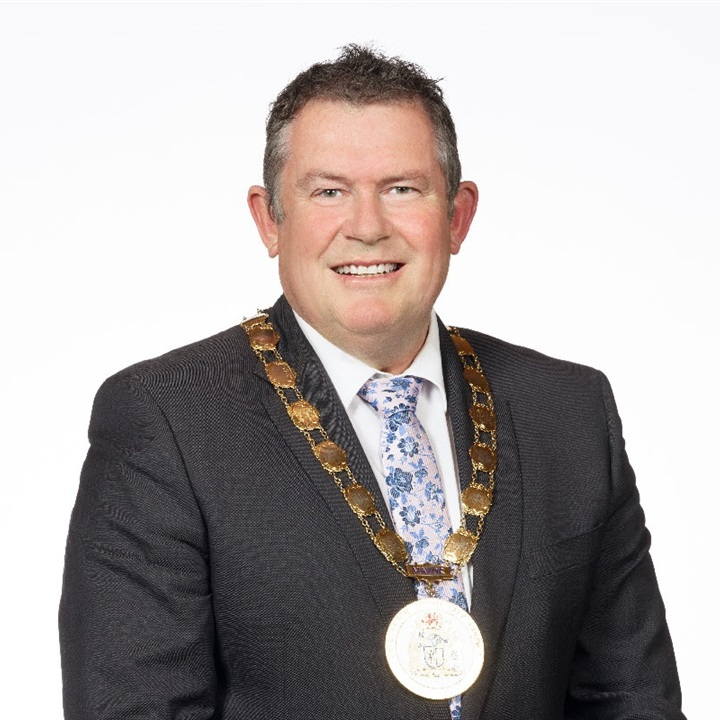
- Incumbent; Grant Smith since 2015
- Style: His/Her Worship
- Term length: Three years, renewable
- Inaugural holder: George Snelson
- Formation: 1877
- Deputy: Debi Marshall-Lobb
- Website: Official website

The mayor of Palmerston North is the head of the municipal government of Palmerston North, New Zealand, and presides over the Palmerston North City Council. The current mayor is Grant Smith, who became mayor in a February 2015 by-election. This resulted from the resignation of Jono Naylor in October 2014 after his election to the House of Representatives. Since the 2013 election, Palmerston North is one of the few councils that uses the single transferable vote electoral system for the election of mayor.

== Voting system ==
Council elections were annually at first, and biennial since 1914. The mayor is directly elected using a single transferable vote electoral system, starting with the 2013 election, and with a first past the post system earlier. Elections are held every three years.

== History ==
The Borough Council was established on 12 July 1877. At the time, Palmerston North was an isolated village in the midst of a native forest that covered inland Manawatu. The population was approximately 800 people. The first elections on 9 August 1877 returned a council with nine members, including George Snelson as the first mayor. Snelson is regarded as the founding father of Palmerston North.

On 1 August 1930, Palmerston North was officially gazetted as a city, the 7th settlement in New Zealand to have reached the then-threshold of 20,000 inhabitants. With that, the Borough Council became a city council.

Jono Naylor was first elected mayor in 2007, and resigned that position after being elected to the House of Representatives in the 2014 election as a list MP for the National Party. Grant Smith was elected in his place in 2015, with the previous deputy mayor Jim Jefferies having been acting mayor in the intervening period.

There have been 29 holders of the position. The longest-serving was Gus Mansford, who held the post for 16 years. Jill White was the first female mayor in 1998, since followed by Heather Tanguay in 2004.

Three mayors have held non-consecutive terms:

- George Snelson (4 separate periods)
- James Linton
- William Thomas Wood

Five mayors also served as members of Parliament:

- William Thomas Wood (1902–1908)
- Jimmy Nash (1918–1935)
- Blair Tennent (1945–1954; 1957–1964)
- Jill White (1993–1998)
- Jono Naylor (2014–2017)

Of those, Nash and Tennent have fulfilled the role of mayor and member of parliament concurrently:

- Nash for five years (1918–1923)
- Tennent for two years (1957–1959)

== List of office holders ==
The following persons have served as mayor of Palmerston North:

	Name	Portrait	Term
1	George Snelson		1877–1879
2	James Linton		1879–1882
3	Frits Jenssen		1882–1883
(1)	George Snelson		1883–1884
(2)	James Linton		1884–1885
4	Alexander Ferguson		1885–1886
5	Ludolph Georg West		1886–1887
6	Solomon Abrahams		1887–1889
(1)	George Snelson		1889–1892
7	Robert Edwards		1892–1893
8	William Park		1893–1895
9	William Thomas Wood		1895–1899
10	Henry Haydon		1899–1901
(1)	George Snelson		1901
(9)	William Thomas Wood		1901–1903
11	Charles Dunk		1903–1904
12	Edward Orr Hurley		1904–1905
13	Maurice Cohen		1905–1907
14	Richard Essex		1907–1908
15	Jimmy Nash		1908–1923
16	Frederick Joseph Nathan		1923–1927
17	Archibald James Graham		1927–1931
18	Gus Mansford		1931–1947
19	Geoffrey Tremaine		1947–1956
20	Blair Tennent		1956–1959
21	Gilbert Rennie		1959–1969
22	Desmond Barry Black		1969–1971
23	Brian Elwood		1971–1985
24	Paul Rieger		1985–1998
25	Jill White		1998–2001
26	Mark Bell-Booth		2001–2004
27	Heather Tanguay		2004–2007
28	Jono Naylor		2007–2014
29	Grant Smith		2015–present

=== Deputy mayors ===
^{†} Died in office

Name	Term	Mayor
Robert Edwards	c. 1903	Wood?
Solomon Abrahams	June – December 1906	Cohen
Ernest Hugh Crabb	c. November 1920	Nash
Stephen Lancaster	1921–1923	Nash
Frederick Jackson	1923–1925	Nathan
Archibald James Graham	1925–1927	Nathan
Unknown	1927–c. 1930	Graham
Meldrum Alfred Eliott	fl.1930–1931	Graham
Joe Hodgens	1931–1936	Mansford
Geoffrey Tremaine	1936–1947	Mansford
F. G. Opie	fl.1948–1952	Tremaine
Unknown	c. 1952–c. 1958	–
David Thomas Spring	fl.1958–1970	Tennent
David Thomas Spring	fl.1958–1970	Rennie
David Thomas Spring	fl.1958–1970	Black
Unknown	c. 1970–1974	–
Gordon Brown	1974–1976	Elwood
Gordon Robert Kear	c. 1977–1983^{[†]}	Elwood
Unknown	1983–1985	Elwood
Bernard John Forde	1985–1998	Rieger
Jim Jefferies	1998–2001	White
Alison Wall	2001–2004	Bell-Booth
John Hornblow	2004–2010	Tanguay
John Hornblow	2004–2010	Naylor
Jim Jefferies	2010–2015	Naylor
Duncan McCann	2015–2016	Smith
Tangi Utikere	2016–2020	Smith
Aleisha Rutherford	2020–2022	Smith
Debi Marshall-Lobb	2022–present	Smith
