= Frederick de Jersey Clere =

Anglo-New Zealand architect (1856–1952)

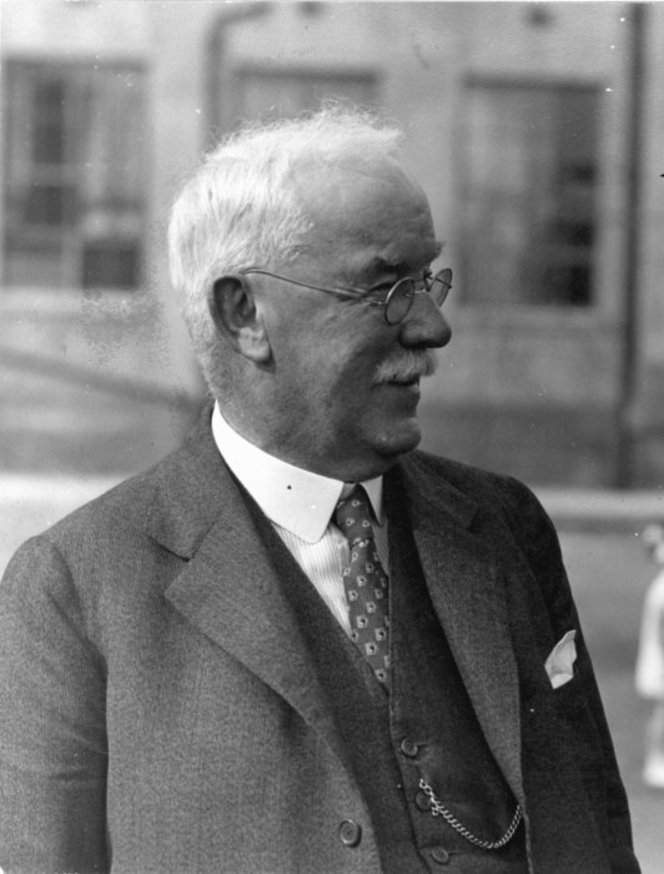
Frederick de Jersey Clere, c. 1936

Frederick de Jersey Clere (7 January 1856 – 13 August 1952) was a New Zealand ecclesiastical architect. Born in Walsden, Lancashire, Clere received his architectural training in Brighton and London, later immigrating to New Zealand. In New Zealand Clere was appointed architect to the Anglican Diocese of Wellington and designed over a hundred churches, with many of them still extant. Clere was an adopter and advocate of reinforced concrete with the majority of his works after 1910 adopting the material. Clere's most notable reinforced concrete design being St Mary of the Angels, Wellington. Multiple of Clere's designs — both ecclesiastical and domestic and commercial — have heritage protection.

Clere was a founding member and fellow of the New Zealand Institute of Architects.

== Early life ==
Clere was born in Walsden, Lancashire on 7 January 1856. Clere's father, Henry, was an Anglican clergyman. Frederick spent 6 years at St John's School in Clapton, London before articling to Edmund Scott at the age of 16. Scott was a Brighton architect who focused on ecclesiastical architecture. After 3 years, in 1875, Clere became assistant to ecclesiastical architect Robert Jewell Withers in London and joined the London Architectural Association.

== Architectural career ==
Clere and his family arrived in Wellington aboard the Hurunui on 12 December 1877. Clere had difficulty acquiring work in Wellington so moved to the nascent settlement of Feilding in 1879. In Feilding there was ample work. Clere's most notable work in Feilding is the Church of St John the Evangelist. In 1882 Clere was made an associate of the Royal Institute of British Architects and a fellow in 1886.

In 1883 Clere was appointed as architect for the Anglican Diocese of Wellington and moved to Whanganui. In Whanganui Clere was appointed as architect to the Wanganui Education Board and partnered with Alfred Atkins. In 1886 Clere moved to Wellington and two years later disestablished his partnership with Atkins. (Note: Although the partnership was disestablished the two remained on good terms. Clere nominated Atkins for fellowship to the RIBA and provided work opportunities to Atkins) Clere went on to form Clere, Fitzgerald & Richmond, this practice was active in the 1890s but after 1899 both Richmond and Clere had left. Clere formed a new partnership with his draughtsman John Swan but this had been dissolved by the time he moved to Lower Hutt in 1901.

In 1905 Clere's son Herbert started training under his father. In 1910 Herbert moved to Palmerston North and established Clere & Son. Frederick focused on ecclesiastical designs whilst Herbert carried out commercial and domestic designs.

Clere entered a partnership with Llewellyn Williams in 1919 but this had ended by 1923 over disagreements. After this Herbert returned from Palmerston North to work with his father in Wellington as Clere & Clere. Herbert continued to focus on domestic architecture whilst his father handled ecclesiastical contracts and on commercial properties the two would work together. Frederick became less active from 1935 but his son continued the practice of Clere & Clere until 1962.

Clere was a founding member of the New Zealand Institute of Architects and held the position of secretary for 50 years. In 1939 Clere was made a fellow.

As architect for the Anglican Wellington Diocese, Clere designed over 100 churches. Clere used the Gothic Revival style for his church designs with the most noteworthy being St John's, Feilding, All Saints' Church, Palmerston North, St Mary of the Angels, Wellington, and St Andrew's Church, New Plymouth. The majority of the churches designed by Clere are extant. For residential works Clere often used the Elizabethan style.

Clere was one of the first New Zealand architects to widely adopt reinforced concrete. Clere used concrete for the majority of his churches after 1904. His most notable reinforced concrete building is the Church of St Mary of the Angels, Wellington. Although Clere designed timber structures he criticised the use of timber by some architects for not being true to form, specifically critiquing the "deceit" in timber structures using masonry-like detailing.

In 1935 Clere was awarded the King George V Silver Jubilee Medal.

== Politics ==
Clere served on the Wellington City Council until 1895 and later served on the Lower Hutt Borough Council.

== Personal life ==
Frederick de Jersey Clere married Mary Goodbehere in Feilding. Mary died in 1904 and 18 months later he married his housekeeper, Elizabeth Ingles. Elizabeth died in 1920. Clere died 13 August 1952.

Clere was an Anglican and was a lay member of the Wellington Diocesan Synod and General Synod from 1900. Clere was also a Freemason and member of the Waiwhetu Lodge.

Clere was an avid watercolour painter and had his work exhibited at the New Zealand Academy of Fine Arts on several occasions and a committee member of the academy. A painting by Clere is held by the Taranaki Museum. Clere was a supporter of the Royal New Zealand Society for the Prevention of Cruelty to Animals.

== List of works ==
Name	Date	Image	Note	Ref
St James Church, Halcombe	1880		First church designed by Clere	
Church of St John the Evangelist, Feilding	1880		Registered as a category 1 building with Heritage New Zealand	
St Martin's Church, Greatford	1881		Registered as a category 2 building with Heritage New Zealand	
Overton	1884		Registered as a category 1 building with Heritage New Zealand. Designed by Atkins and Clere	
Wellington Harbour Board Wharf Office Building	1884		Third floor added in 1895. Registered as a category 1 building with Heritage New Zealand	
St George's Church, Patea	1885		Registered as a category 1 building with Heritage New Zealand	
St John's Church, Whanganui	1887		Scheduled as class C building with the Whanganui District Council. Designed by both Atkins and Clere.	
St Thomas' Church, Meeanee	1887		Registered as a category 2 building with Heritage New Zealand	
St Agnes' Church, Kiwitea	1890		Scheduled as a category B building with the Manawatu District Council	
Wellington Harbour Board Head Office and Bond Store	1892		Registered as a category 1 building with Heritage New Zealand	
Church of St John the Divine, Otakeho	1893		Registered as a category 2 building with Heritage New Zealand. No longer in situ but still extant	
Government Life Insurance building	1893		Demolished in 1932	
Wellington Rowing Club Building	1894		Registered as a category 1 building with Heritage New Zealand	
St Andrew's Church, Manakau	1894		Registered as a category 2 building with Heritage New Zealand	
St Michael and All Angel's Church, Stanway	1895		Registered as a category 2 building with Heritage New Zealand	
St Alban's Church, Pauatahanui	1895		Registered as a category 2 building with Heritage New Zealand	
St Simon and St Jude's Church, Rongotea	1895		Registered as a category 2 building with Heritage New Zealand	
St Thomas' Church, Newtown	1895		Demolished	
St Barnabas Church, Opunake	1895		Scheduled in the Opunake Cultural Heritage Inventory	
St Andrew's Church, Colyton	1896		Scheduled as a category B building with the Manawatu District Council	
Puketiro	1896		Registered as a category 2 building with Heritage New Zealand	
Ronayne House	1896			
Highden	c.1897		Registered as a category 1 building with Heritage New Zealand	
St Mary Magadalene Church, Ashhurst	1897		Registered as a category 2 building with Heritage New Zealand	
St Mary's Church, Levin	1897		Demolished c.1954	
Church of St Saviour, Kimbolton	1898		Scheduled as a category B building with the Manawatu District Council	
Church of the Venerable Bede, Shannon	1898		Registered as a category 2 building with Heritage New Zealand	
The Suter Memorial Art Gallery	1899		Registered as a category 2 building with Heritage New Zealand	
Mahina	1900			
Stoneham's Building or Kelburn Chambers	1901		Registered as a category 2 building with Heritage New Zealand	
Nelson School of Music	1901		Registered as a category 1 building with Heritage New Zealand	
Church of St John the Baptist, Ohau	1901		Registered as a category 2 building with Heritage New Zealand	
St Augustine's Church, Petone	1902		Registered as a category 2 building with Heritage New Zealand	
St Aidan's Church, Tokomaru	1902			
St Barnabas' Church, Rangiwahia	1903		Registered as a category B building with the Manawatu District Council	
St Paul's Church, Cheltenham	1904		Registered as a category 2 building with Heritage New Zealand	
Avon House	1904		Registered as a category 3 building with the New Zealand Historic Places Trust but was demolished in 1987	
St Andrew's Church, Whareama	1904		Burnt down	
Chinese Mission Hall	1906		Registered as a category 2 building with Heritage New Zealand	
St Peter's Church, Paekakariki	1908			
Kelburn property	1908			
Hill Haven	1909		Former residence of Michael Joseph Savage and Peter Fraser	
Brendenwood	c.1909		Demolished c.1995.	
St Alban's Church, Eastbourne	1909			
Brandon Street Chambers	1910		Scheduled with the Wellington City Council	
St Thomas' Church, Motueka	1910		Registered as a category 2 building with Heritage New Zealand	
Church of St Mary the Mother of Jesus, Beaconsfield	1911		Registered as a category 2 building with Heritage New Zealand	
St Mary's Church, Karori	1911		Registered as a category 2 building with Heritage New Zealand. Clere also designed the vicarage in 1906 and an expansion in 1917	
All Saints' Church, Palmerston North	1913		Registered as a category 1 building with Heritage New Zealand	
St Matthew's Church, Hastings	1914		Registered as a category 1 building with Heritage New Zealand	
AMP Building, New Plymouth	1916		Scheduled as category A heritage building with the New Plymouth District Council	
St Andrew's Church, Plimmerton	1916			
St Mary of the Angels, Wellington	1919		Registered as a category 1 building with Heritage New Zealand	
St Matthias' Church, Makara	1921		Registered as a category 2 building with Heritage New Zealand	
St Barnabas Church, Khandallah	1921		Designed with Llewellyn Williams	
St John's Church, Johnsonville	1921			
Inverleith Flats	1922		Registered as a category 2 building with Heritage New Zealand. Designed with Llewellyn Williams	
Our Lady Star of the Sea Convent Chapel	1922		Registered as a category 2 building with Heritage New Zealand	
Cathedral of the Holy Spirit, Palmerston North	1923		Registered as a category 1 building with Heritage New Zealand	
St Andrew's on the Terrace	1923		Registered as a category 1 building with Heritage New Zealand	
Convent of Mercy	1925		Demolished in 1982	
St Brigid's Church, Feilding	1925		Demolished in 2009	
AMP Society Building	1925		Registered as a category 1 building. Designed by Frederick and Herbert de Jersey Clere.	
All Saints Church, Hataitai	1928		Registered as a category 2 building with Heritage New Zealand	
All Saints Church, Otaki	1930			
St Gerard's Monastery	1931		Registered as a category 1 building with Heritage New Zealand. Clere's former partner, John Swan, designed St Gerard's Church.	
St Andrew's Church, New Plymouth	1932		Registered as a category 2 building with Heritage New Zealand	
