= Zillah Gill =

New Zealand politician and community leader (1859–1937)

Zillah Smith Gill (29 May 1859–17 August 1937) was a New Zealand local politician and community leader in Palmerston North. She was born in Kingston upon Hull, Yorkshire, England on 29 May 1859.
