= Grant Smith (politician) =

New Zealand politician

His Worship the Mayor Grant Smith
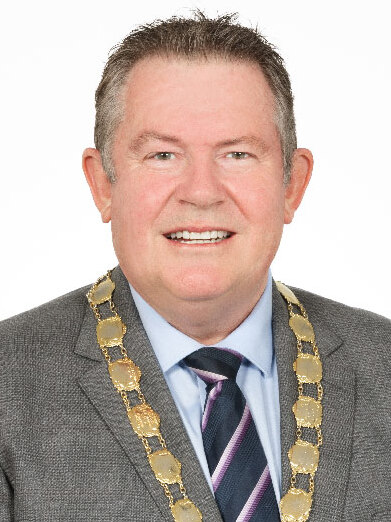
- Smith in 2025

29th Mayor of Palmerston North
- Incumbent
- Assumed office 10 February 2015
- Deputy: Duncan McCann (2015–2016); Tangi Utikere (2016–2020); Aleisha Rutherford (2020–2022); Debi Marshall-Lobb (2022–present)
- Preceded by: Jono Naylor

Personal details
- Born: 1966 or 1967 (age 59–60) Manawatū, New Zealand
- Spouse: Michelle
- Children: 2
- Website: http://www.grantsmith.co.nz/

Grant Charles Smith (born 1966 or 1967) is the 29th mayor of Palmerston North, New Zealand. He was first elected to the Palmerston North City Council in 2013, and was elected as mayor in the February 2015 by-election when Jono Naylor resigned. He then won the 2016 election with around 17,500 more votes than his only rival. He was re-elected in 2022. He came from a background of marketing and media, selling his design business when first elected as mayor.

Smith was re-elected as mayor in the 2025 elections.

Political offices
Preceded by Jono Naylor	Mayor of Palmerston North; 2015–present	Incumbent
