= Jono Naylor =

New Zealand politician

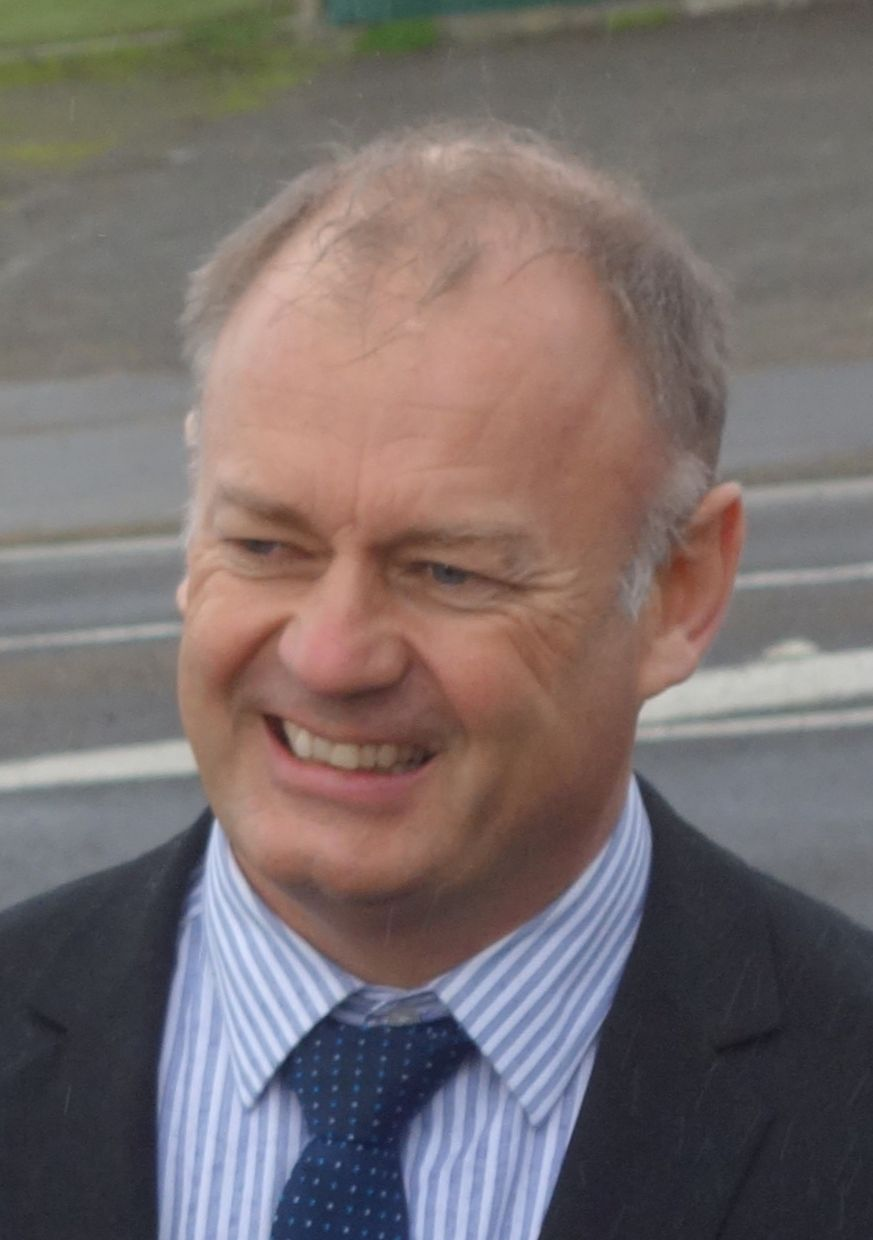
- Naylor in 2015

Member of the New Zealand Parliament for National Party list
- In office 20 September 2014 – 23 September 2017

28th Mayor of Palmerston North
- In office 2007–2014
- Preceded by: Heather Tanguay
- Succeeded by: Grant Smith

Personal details
- Born: Jonathan Mark Naylor; 1966 (age 59–60) Upper Hutt, New Zealand
- Party: National Party
- Other political affiliations: Independent (as Mayor)
- Spouse: Karen
- Children: George, Luke and Chloe
- Website: Official council website 2014 campaign website

Jonathan Mark Naylor (born 1966), commonly known as Jono Naylor, is a New Zealand politician from Palmerston North. He was Mayor of Palmerston North from 2007 until 2014, when he was elected to the House of Representatives in the 2014 election as a list MP for the National Party. He did not stand for re-election as an MP in 2017. In 2018 he was elected to Horizons Regional Council in the by-election following the death of Councillor Pat Kelly. He was re-elected to Horizons in the 2019 local election and was appointed as Horizons deputy chair.

== Early life ==
Naylor was born in Upper Hutt and raised in Wellington, Auckland, and Masterton before moving to Palmerston North to study at Massey University in 1985. In 1997, he earned a Bachelor of Social Work. He is married with three children.

== Political career ==
New Zealand Parliament
Years	Term	Electorate	List	Party
2014–2017	51st	List	51	National

Naylor became a member of the city council in 2001 and was elected mayor in 2007, defeating incumbent Heather Tanguay.

Naylor sought the nomination of the National Party for candidacy in the Palmerston North electorate for the 2014 election and was the sole nominee. He promised to resign as mayor if elected to Parliament. Naylor was beaten in the election by the incumbent, Labour's Iain Lees-Galloway. Naylor was in 51st place on National's party list, and based on preliminary results, he was returned as a list MP, but this was not certain as the counting of special votes might have changed the number of List MPs elected for National.

He declined to resign as long as his election as an MP was not guaranteed, with final results of the election being published on 4 October. This caused some protest, as he was meanwhile drawing two salaries. The delay in decision making also meant that a by-election for mayor could not be held before year's end, and would thus be held during February, with campaigning falling into the main holiday period; Lees-Galloway suggested that Naylor should meanwhile donate one of his salaries. When the final results did come out, Naylor's election was confirmed, but he was now the lowest-ranked National MP, with Maureen Pugh in 52nd place having lost her place in Parliament. Naylor announced that his resignation as mayor is to follow shortly. Grant Smith was elected in his place in February 2015.

He announced in late 2016 that he would not seek re-election at the 2017 general election.

In 2018 he returned to local government, being elected to the Horizons Regional Council at a by-election. He was re-elected to the council in 2019, 2022, and 2025.

Political offices
Preceded by Heather Tanguay	Mayor of Palmerston North; 2007–2014	Succeeded by Grant Smith
