= Leo Close =

Irish priest (1934-1977)

Leo Close OBE
- Born: 20 October 1934; Dublin, Ireland
- Died: 18 January 1977 (aged 42); Dunedin, New Zealand
- Education: University College Dublin; All Hallows College
- Occupations: priest, athlete

Leo St John Close OBE (20 October 1934 – 18 January 1977) was an Irish Vincentian priest and Paralympian sportsman and organiser, who was first president of the Irish Wheelchair Association. Born in Drumcondra in 1934, in Dublin, Christian Brothers in Marino, at Belvedere College and at Mount St Joseph’s Cistercian College in Roscrea, he studied for at All Hallows College in Drumcondra. He was paralysed in an accident aged 23 while a young seminarian; as a wheelchair user his path to ordination was supported by the Archbishop McQuaid of Dublin, a family friend, and Fr William Purcell of All Hallows. He obtained a BA from University College Dublin in preparation for his anticipated role in education. Clerical students from All Hallows would often study at UCD parallel to their clerical studies; with the assistance of classmates, Close was able to attend lectures on the top floor of the Earlsfort Terrace building. He continued his studies taking University College Dublin, obtaining a diploma in education, and an MA from Catechetics at the Lumen Vitae Institute in Brussels in 1963.

A lover of sport, he competed in archery, table tennis, javelin, shot put and discus amongst other events, despite his impairment. He was also a regular at Croke Park, where the RTÉ Commentator (another Drumcondra man) Michael O'Hehir would often point out Close sitting in front of Hill 16. Close captained the Irish Team at the first Paralympic Games in 1960 in Rome and competed for Ireland in the 1964 Tokyo Paralympic Games. He competed for New Zealand, where he was working as a priest, in the 1968 Tel Aviv Paralympic Games and in the 1972 Heidelberg Paralympic Games.

After a meeting in the Mater Hospital in Dublin, he helped found the Irish Wheelchair Association, which he became the first chairman of a post he held until 1964, when he went to Dunedin, New Zealand, attending the Paralympics in Tokyo on the way. He was involved in organising disabled sports in New Zealand both locally in Otago and nationally. He also founded the Wheelchair Association in New Zealand.

In the 1975 New Year Honours, Close was appointed an Officer of the Order of the British Empire, for services to the paraplegic movement.

== Death ==
Close was diagnosed with liver cancer in 1976 and died in Dunedin, New Zealand, on 18 January 1977.
