= Palmerston North City Council =

Territorial authority of New Zealand

Palmerston North City Council Te Kaunihera o Papaioea
- Coat of arms

- Brand logo

Type
- Type: Territorial authority of Palmerston North
- Term limits: None

History
- Established: 1 November 1989; 36 years ago
- Preceded by: Palmerston North City Council
- New session started: 18 October 2025

Leadership
- Mayor: Grant Smith, Ind. since 12 February 2015
- Deputy mayor: Debi Marshall-Lobb, TPM since 26 October 2022
- CEO: Waid Crockett since 7 November 2022

Structure
- Seats: 16 (including mayor)
- Political groups: Independent (12); Green (2); Labour (1); Te Pāti Māori (1)

Elections
- Voting system: Single transferable vote
- First election: 14 October 1989
- Last election: 11 October 2025
- Next election: 14 October 2028

Motto
- Palmam qui meruit ferat ("Let him, who has earned it, bear the palm")

Meeting place
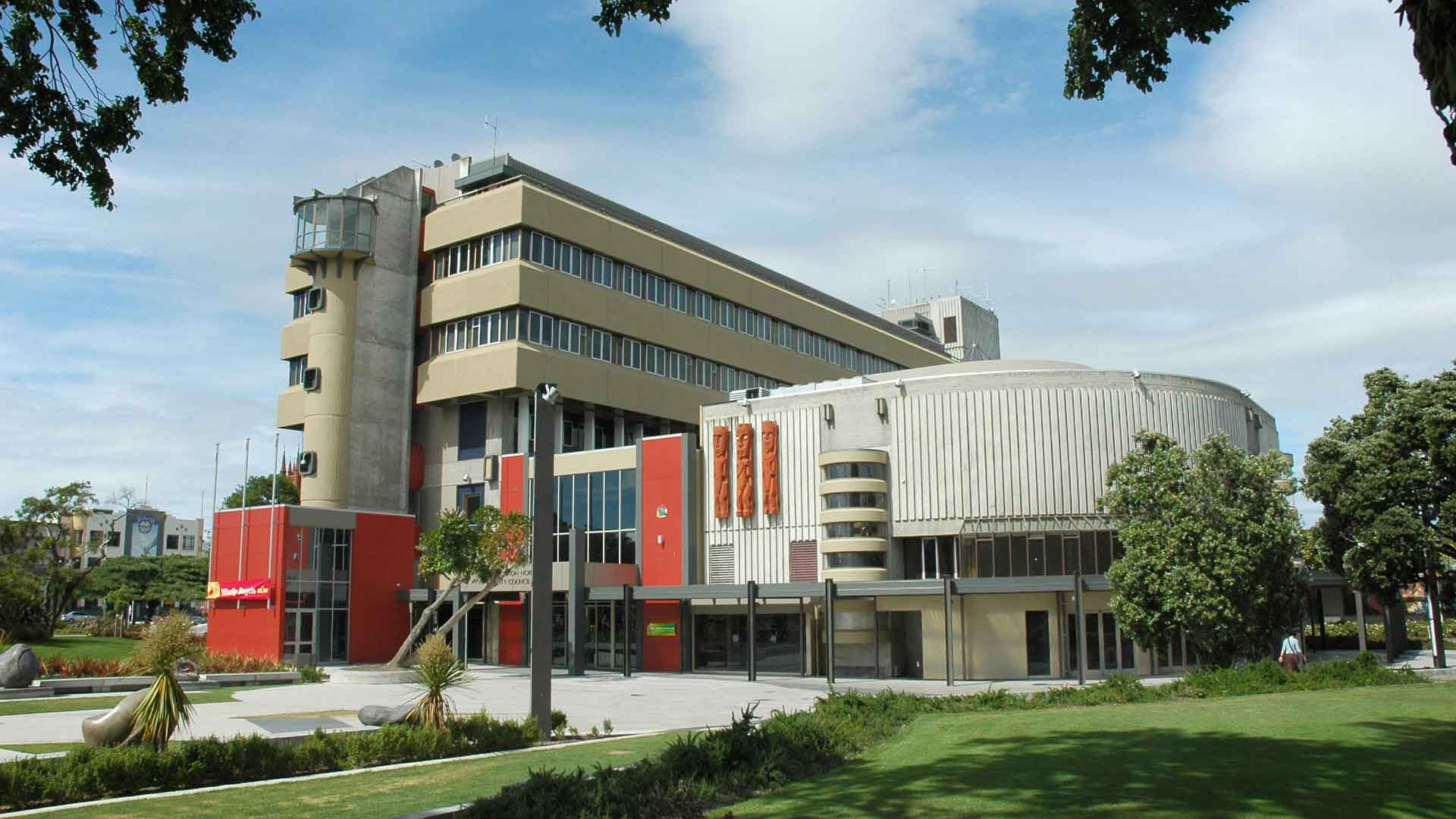
- 32 The Square

Website
- pncc.govt.nz

Palmerston North City Council (abbr. PNCC; Māori: Te Kaunihera o Papaioea) is the territorial authority for the city of Palmerston North, New Zealand. It serves as the city's local government alongside Horizons Regional Council as the regional council.

A borough council for the area was formed in 1877, and was granted city status in 1930. Following the 1989 reforms to local government, that city council was dissolved and the current authority established.

The governing body of the council has 15 councillors and is chaired by the mayor of Palmerston North (currently Grant Smith since February 2015).

== History ==
=== Predecessors ===
Local government in Palmerston North began with the formation of a town board and a local board within Wellington Province in 1876,. When the provinces were dissolved in 1876, Palmerston North became part of the newly established Manawatū County.

An independent borough council for Palmerston North was proclaimed on 12 July 1877, splitting from Manawatū County. The first borough council consisted of nine councillors, and George Matthew Snelson was elected unopposed to be the first Mayor of Palmerston North on 9 August 1877.

It went on to be raised to city-status on 11 August 1930, becoming New Zealand's 7th city.

The boundaries of the city went on to be expanded to include parts of Awapuni (in April 1953), Highbury (in April 1961), and Amberley, Aokautere, Kelvin Grove, Milson and further parts of Awapuni (in September 1967).

=== 1989 reforms ===
Following the local government reforms of 1989, the city council's boundaries were again extended to include Ashhurst, Linton and Turitea through amalgamation of parts of the former Kairanga County, Oroua County and Ashhurst Town Council.

=== Expansion since 1989 ===
On 1 July 2012, Bunnythorpe, Longburn, part of the area around Kairanga and an area around Ashhurst were transferred from the Manawatū District to Palmerston North City.

== Composition ==
The elected mayor and councillors provide governance for the city by setting the policy direction of the council, monitoring its performance, representing the city's interests, and employing the Chief Executive.

=== Mayor ===
One mayor is elected at-large; they chair meetings of the governing body and act as the head of local government in the district.

=== Current composition ===
The current members of the governing body of council are:

Role	Portrait	Name	Affiliation	Ward
Mayor		Grant Smith	Independent	At-large
Deputy		Debi Marshall-Lobb	Te Pāti Māori	Te Pūao
Councillor		Bonnie Kuru	Independent	Te Pūao
Councillor		Billy Meehan	Independent	Te Hirawanui
Councillor		Brent Barrett	Green	Te Hirawanui
Councillor		Hayden Fitzgerald	Independent	Te Hirawanui
Councillor		Karen Naylor	Independent	Te Hirawanui
Councillor		Kaydee Zabelin	Green	Te Hirawanui
Councillor		Leonie Hapeta	Independent	Te Hirawanui
Councillor		Lew Findlay	Independent	Te Hirawanui
Councillor		Lorna Johnson	Labour	Te Hirawanui
Councillor		Mark Arnott	Independent	Te Hirawanui
Councillor		Orphée Mickalad	Independent	Te Hirawanui
Councillor		Rachel Bowen	Independent	Te Hirawanui
Councillor		Vaughan Dennison	Independent	Te Hirawanui
Councillor		William Wood	Independent	Te Hirawanui

== Wards ==
In 2017 the council voted to create a Māori ward, but the decision was overturned by a city-wide referendum in May 2018.

In 2021, Palmerston North City Council again voted to establish a Māori ward following the passing of the Local Electoral (Māori Wards and Māori Constituencies) Amendment Act 2021.

== Elections ==
The local elections of 1962 returned the first woman and first Māori councillors to the city council.

=== List ===
==== Council ====
- 1989
- 1992
- 1995
- 1998
- 2001
- 2004
- 2007
- 2010
- 2013
- (2015)
- 2016
- 2019
- 2022
- 2025

==== Mayoral ====
- 1989
- 1992
- 1995
- 1998
- 2001
- 2004
- 2007
- 2010
- 2013
- (2015)
- 2016
- 2019
- 2022
- 2025

== Civic symbols ==
=== Coat of arms ===
Palmerston North City Council was granted an official coat of arms in 1989, incorporating elements of the council's previous unofficial coat of arms which had been in use since 1885. The arms contain several visual puns on the name of the city. A description of the arms is:

Coat of arms of Palmerston North
Crest On top of a mural crown, the crest is a red lion passant with blue tongue and claws holding a scallop shell (taken from the badge of a palmer) in its right paw, framed by palm fronds. Escutcheon The shield of the coat of arms of Palmerston North is gold on the left and blue on the right and having a bordure which is blue on the left and gold on the right. On the left side of the shield is a blue eagle with its wings displayed, having a red tongue and claws, and wearing a gold crown. On the right side of the shield is a gold tower. Supporters For supporters, on the left side is a Māori chief (modelled on Te Peeti Te Aweawe) representing the tangata whenua and on the right is a European woman in early to mid-19th Century domestic working dress representing the European settlers. Motto Palmam qui meruit ferat ("Let him, who has earned it, bear the palm") (the motto of Lord Nelson)

=== Flag ===
Flag of Palmerston North

The flag of the Palmerston North City Council consists of the coat of arms on a white field. There have been suggestions to change the flag to better represent the city.

== See also ==
- Territorial authorities bordering Palmerston North City Council:
  - Manawatū District Council
  - Tararua District Council
  - Horowhenua District Council
- Horizons Regional Council – the regional council covering Palmerston North
