= Graeme Marett =

New Zealand para-athlete

Personal information
- Nationality: New Zealand
Medal record
Men's para athletics
Representing New Zealand
Paralympic Games
Silver medal – second place	1972 Heidelberg	Discus 2
Bronze medal – third place	1972 Heidelberg	Pentathlon 2

Graeme Marett (5 June 1938 - 1999) was a Paralympic athletics competitor from New Zealand. He won a silver and a bronze medal at the 1972 Games in the Discus 2 and Pentathlon 2 events.
