= George Snelson =

1st Mayor of Palmerston North

1st Mayor of Palmerston North
- In office 9 August 1877 – 1879
- Succeeded by: James Linton
- In office 1883–1884
- Preceded by: Frits Jenssen
- Succeeded by: James Linton
- In office 1889–1892
- Preceded by: Solomon Abrahams
- Succeeded by: Robert Edwards
- In office 1901 – 31 October 1901
- Preceded by: Henry Haydon
- Succeeded by: William Thomas Wood

Personal details
- Born: George Matthew Snelson; 22 November 1837 Ashby-de-la-Zouch, Leicestershire, England
- Died: 31 October 1901 (aged 63) Palmerston North, New Zealand
- Spouse: Louisa Matilda Buck
- Children: two (both died as infants)

George Matthew Snelson (22 November 1837 – 31 October 1901) was the first Mayor of Palmerston North and is considered Palmerston North's founding father. He was an ironmonger, a storekeeper and a community leader.

== Early life ==
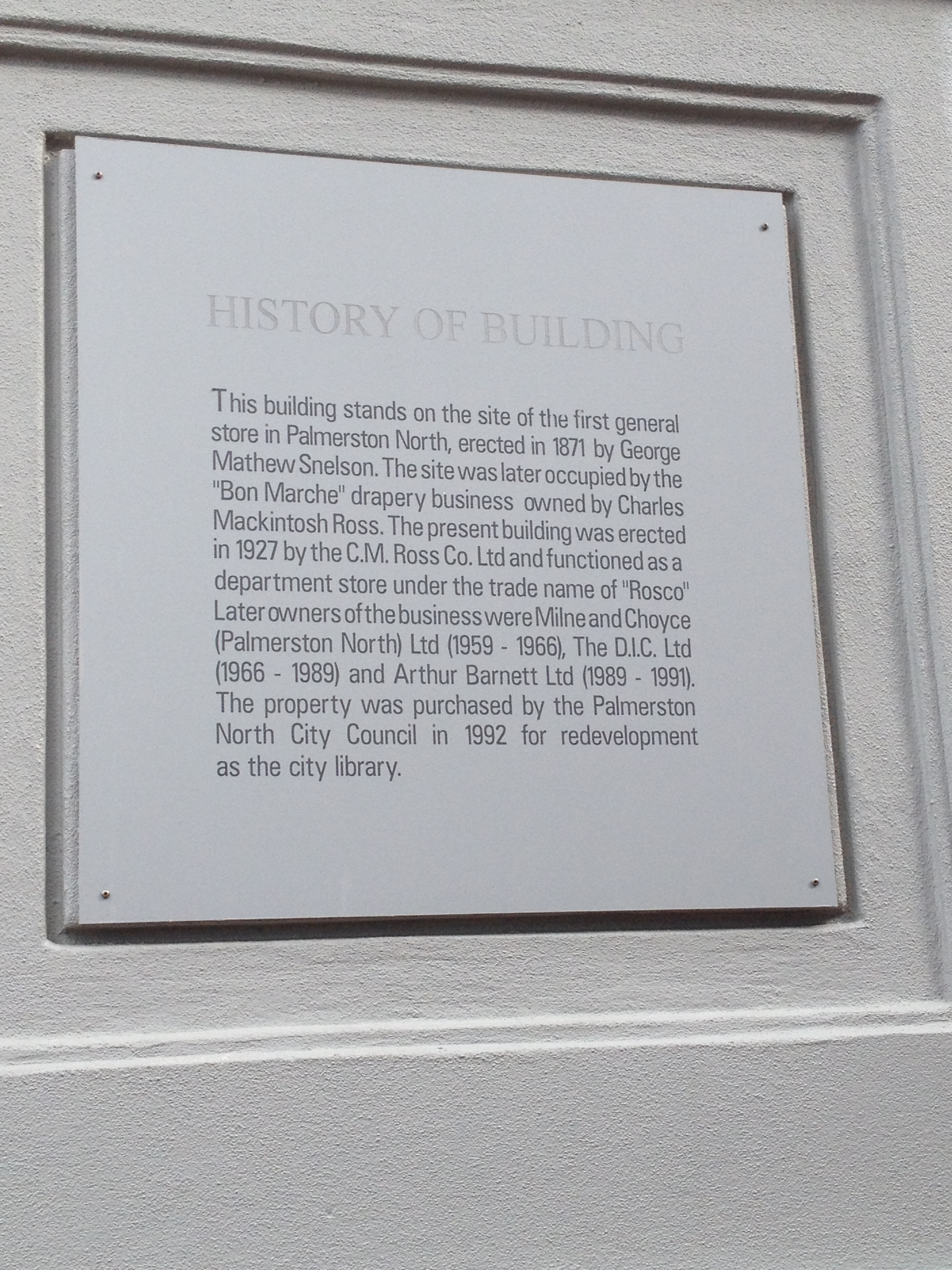
Plaque on the Palmerston North City Library, commemorating Snelson's first store

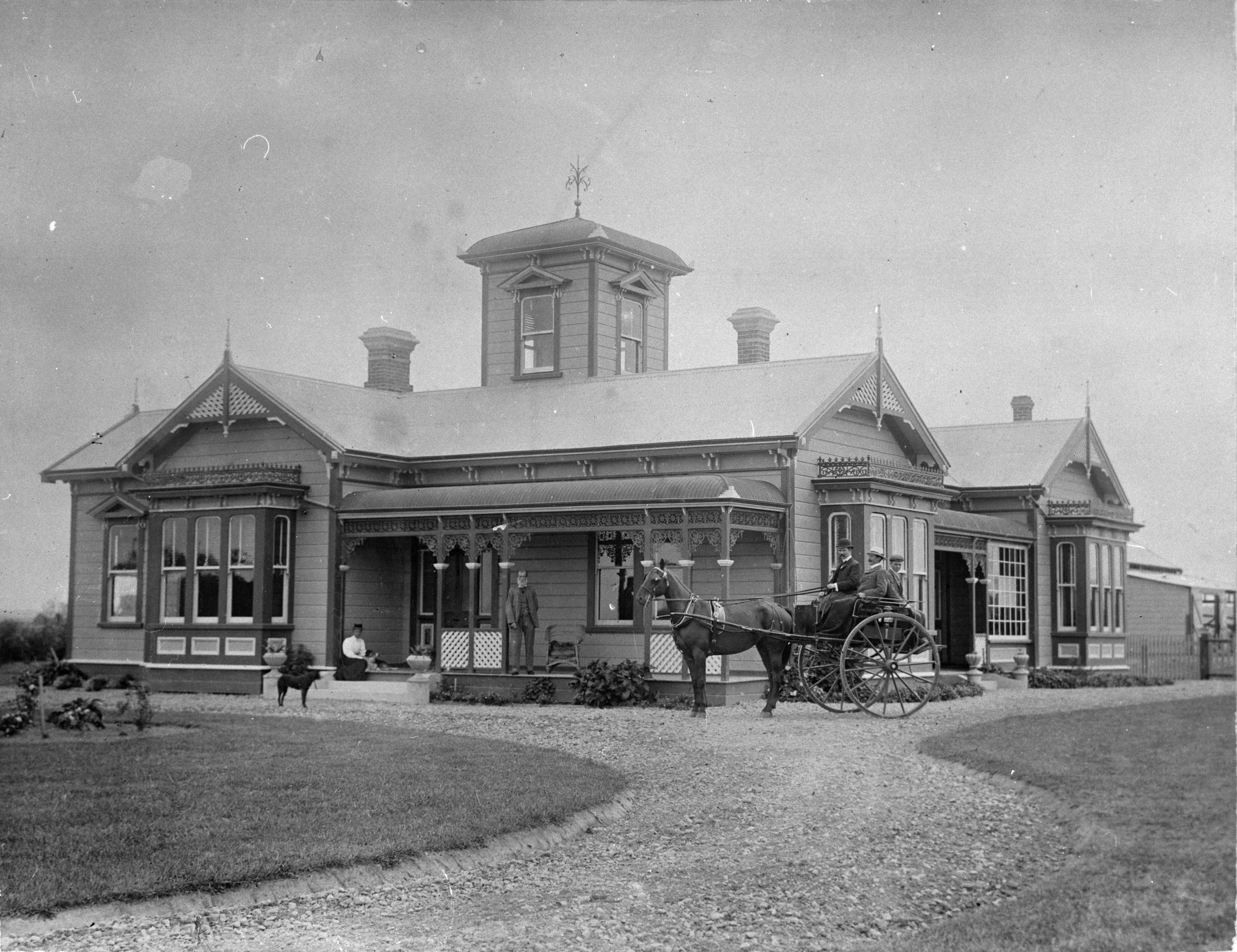
Cluny Park homestead in circa 1894

Snelson was born in Ashby-de-la-Zouch, Leicestershire, England, on 22 November 1837. His parents were James Snelson (coach manufacturer) and Mary (née Halford). He left school when he was 15 to learn the trade of ironmonger and hardware merchant in Melton Mowbray. At age 19, he moved to Bedford for new employment.

He came to New Zealand on 21 February 1863 aboard the Earl of Windsor, arriving in Wellington.

He married Louisa Matilda (née Buck, b. 1844 in Wellington) on 6 July 1865. For a time, he owned the Cluny Park homestead on Rangitikei Line.

== Political activity ==
=== Mayor of Palmerston North ===
Snelson was elected mayor seven times. He and his wife are regarded as the father and the mother of Palmerston North. He was the mayor of Palmerston North's first council, elected unopposed on 9 August 1877. The first council had nine members. He served until 1879.

He was again elected in 1883–1884, and then 1889–1892. He died during his seventh term in office in 1901.

On 8 November 1901, the borough councillors elected a new mayor. Two councillors contested the mayoralty, and William Thomas Wood beat Fred Pirani 6 to 4. Councillor Pirani resigned from his seat afterwards on the grounds that he had been misled.

=== Parliamentary contender ===
Snelson stood for Parliament in 1879 and 1893, but was unsuccessful on both occasions.

== Death ==
Snelson died at his home in Palmerston North on 31 October 1901, and was buried in Terrace End Cemetery. He was survived by his wife, who died on 15 December 1919 during a visit to Whanganui. Snelson Street in Palmerston North is named after the Snelsons.
