= Palmerston North (electorate) =

- Single-member general constituency for the New Zealand House of Representatives
- Interactive map of boundaries from the 2026 election
- Formation: 1890
- Region: Manawatū-Whanganui
- Character: Urban and suburban
- Term: 3 years

Member for Palmerston North
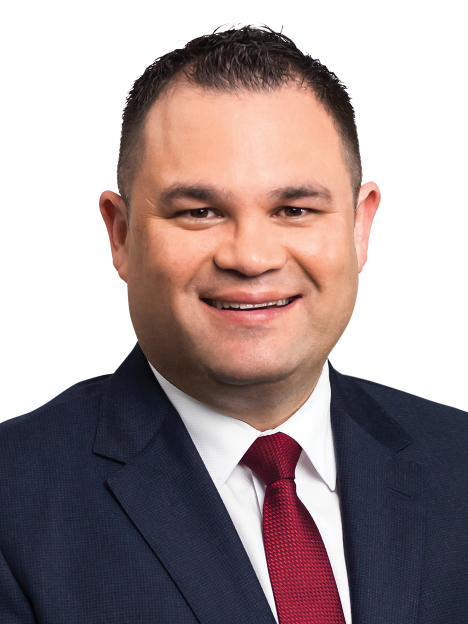
- Tangi Utikere since 17 October 2020
- Party: Labour
- List MPs: Teanau Tuiono (Green)
- Previous MP: Iain Lees-Galloway (Labour)
Party vote distribution

Palmerston North is a parliamentary electorate, returning one Member of Parliament to the New Zealand House of Representatives. The electorate was first formed for the 1890 election and was called Palmerston until 1938. The current MP for Palmerston North is Tangi Utikere of the Labour Party. He has held this position since the 2020 election.

== Profile ==
In December 1887, the House of Representatives voted to reduce its membership from general electorates from 91 to 70. The 1890 electoral redistribution used the same 1886 census data used for the 1887 electoral redistribution. In addition, three-member electorates were introduced in the four main centres. This resulted in a major restructuring of electorates, and Palmerston was one of four electorates to be first created for the 1890 election.

Map of boundaries at the 2020 and 2023 general elections

Palmerston North reached its current approximate size at the expense of the old Manawatu electorate in the lead up to the introduction of mixed-member proportional (MMP) voting in 1996. The boundaries of the Palmerston North electorate were last adjusted in the 2007 redistribution, when the electorate became fully urban and covered all of the urbanised part of Palmerston North City, with the towns in its orbit such as Ashhurst and Linton becoming part of the neighbouring electorate of Rangitīkei. To counter the population loss on the Manawatu River's left bank, the section of the city on the right bank, including the suburb of Milson, was moved in at the same time. No boundary adjustments were undertaken in the subsequent 2013/14 redistribution. In the 2025 boundary review, the electorate would expand to include the outer suburbs of Aokautere, Fitzherbert, Longburn, Turitea, Whakarongo and the town of Bunnythorpe.

At the 2013 census, the Palmerston North electorate reported the highest share of those working in the retail trade industry (11.4%); those whose occupation was a community and personal service worker (10.9%); and those whose households used mains (natural) gas as a heating fuel. Among general electorates, Palmerston North had the second-highest share of those working in the education and training sector (11.8%), and people affiliated with the Brethren religious denomination (1.2%).

== History ==
The electorate has been loyal to the Labour Party, not having elected a National MP since 1975, and having not re-elected a National MP since 1966.

The first representative of the Palmerston electorate was James Wilson. Wilson previously represented the Foxton electorate until its abolition in 1890. In the 1890 election, Wilson beat Frederick Pirani by 61 votes. In the 1893 election, Wilson stood successfully in the Otaki electorate and Palmerston was won by Pirani, who was confirmed in 1896 and 1899, but defeated in 1902 when he contested the Hutt electorate. In the 1899 election, Prime Minister Richard Seddon expressed his opposition to Pirani (who had previously stood for the Liberal Party) by endorsing William Thomas Wood, who came second that year.

Wood was the successful candidate in the 1902 election, and he was confirmed in 1905. The 1908 election was held under the Second Ballot Act, contested by three candidates. David Buick, Wood and W. Milverton received 2675, 2626 and 123 votes, respectively. As Buick did not receive an absolute majority, a second ballot was required. Buick standing for the Reform Party was again successful in the second round of voting and was thus elected. Buick was re-elected in 1911 and 1914, but died in office on 18 November 1918 during the influenza epidemic.

Jimmy Nash, the sitting Mayor of Palmerston North, won the resulting by-election on 19 December 1918. Nash was confirmed at the next five general elections, but was defeated in the 1935 election by Joe Hodgens of the Labour Party in an election also contested by the then-mayor, Gus Mansford. Hodgens had previously contested the electorate in the 1922 and 1931 elections. He retired from the electorate at the 1946 election due to the deteriorating health of his wife.

The 1946 election was contested between Ormond Wilson for Labour and Mansford, whose relationship with the National Party was strained, since his 1935 election campaign had contributed to the defeat of Nash. Mansford failed to get nominated by the National Party for the 1938 and 1943 elections. So in 1946, the National Party decided not to stand a candidate, with Mansford running as an independent. Wilson obtained a majority of 928 votes.

Wilson lost the subsequent election in 1949 against Blair Tennent of the National Party. Tennent was confirmed at the subsequent election, but then lost against the Labour candidate, Philip Skoglund, in the 1954 election. Skoglund contested the 1957 election against Bill Brown of the National Party and was confirmed by the voters. However, in the 1960 election, Brown beat Skoglund by the narrow majority of 123 votes. At the 1963 election, Brown had a 772-vote majority to Skoglund. The 1966 election was contested by Brown against Labour's Joe Walding, with Brown holding a 259-vote majority. Brown died in office on 16 October 1967 at a function in Kaiapoi.

The resulting 1967 by-election was contested by five candidates: Walding (Labour Party), Gordon Cruden (National Party), John O'Brien (Social Credit Party), Goldingham (Progress) and P. J. Wedderspoon (Democratic Labour). Walding obtained a majority of 592 votes. Walding represented the Palmerston North electorate until the 1975 election, when he was defeated by John Lithgow, and from 1978 to 1981. Six months prior to the 1981 election, he announced his retirement from Parliament.

The Labour nomination was hotly contested and Trevor de Cleene, a good friend of Walding, was the most experienced candidate who put his name forward for selection, and despite concerns about his often controversial nature, he was nominated by the party. The candidate put forward by National was his old foe Brian Elwood, with whom he had worked on the Palmerston North City Council for many years, and against whom he lost the mayoralty contest in 1974. Elwood and de Cleene received 8315 and 10425 votes, respectively (representing 35.7% and 48.5% of the vote), with de Cleene thus entering Parliament in 1981. De Cleene won the 1984 election, called early by Robert Muldoon, with an increased majority over National's candidate, C G Singleton. In the 1987 election, de Cleene raised his share of the vote to 56.2%, defeating National's Paul Curry. He did not seek re-election in the 1990 election.

Iain Lees-Galloway was selected by the Labour Party as successor to retiring MP Steve Maharey, who became Vice Chancellor of Massey University, in a contested Labour Party selection for the 2008 election. Lees-Galloway defeated the National Party candidate, Malcolm Plimmer, with a majority of 1,117 votes. In the 2011 election, Lees-Galloway was confirmed with an increased majority of 3,285 votes, defeating National's Leonie Hapeta. In the 2014 election, Lees-Galloway was challenged by the Mayor of Palmerston North, Jono Naylor, but remained successful. Lees-Galloway had a decreased majority of 2,212 votes over Naylor. Naylor was the lowest-ranked National MP who entered Parliament via their list. Ian Lees-Galloway retired before the 2020 election and was replaced by Tangi Utikere, the city's deputy mayor, as the electorate's MP.

=== Members of Parliament ===
Key

Independent Conservative Liberal Independent Liberal Reform Labour National NZ First

Election	Winner
1890 election	James Wilson
1893 election	Frederick Pirani
1896 election	Frederick Pirani
1899 election	Frederick Pirani
1902 election	William Wood
1905 election	William Wood
1908 election	David Buick
1911 election	David Buick
1914 election	David Buick
1918 by-election	Jimmy Nash
1919 election	Jimmy Nash
1922 election	Jimmy Nash
1925 election	Jimmy Nash
1928 election	Jimmy Nash
1931 election	Jimmy Nash
1935 election	Joe Hodgens
1938 election	Joe Hodgens
1943 election	Joe Hodgens
1946 election	Ormond Wilson
1949 election	Blair Tennent
1951 election	Blair Tennent
1954 election	Philip Skoglund
1957 election	Philip Skoglund
1960 election	Bill Brown
1963 election	Bill Brown
1966 election	Bill Brown
1967 by-election	Joe Walding
1969 election	Joe Walding
1972 election	Joe Walding
1975 election	John Lithgow
1978 election	Joe Walding
1981 election	Trevor de Cleene
1984 election	Trevor de Cleene
1987 election	Trevor de Cleene
1990 election	Steve Maharey
1993 election	Steve Maharey
1996 election	Steve Maharey
1999 election	Steve Maharey
2002 election	Steve Maharey
2005 election	Steve Maharey
2008 election	Iain Lees-Galloway
2011 election	Iain Lees-Galloway
2014 election	Iain Lees-Galloway
2017 election	Iain Lees-Galloway
2020 election	Tangi Utikere
2023 election	Tangi Utikere
2026 election	Tangi Utikere

=== List MPs ===
Members of Parliament elected from party lists in elections where that person also unsuccessfully contested the Palmerston North electorate. Unless otherwise stated, all MPs terms began and ended at general elections.

Election	Winner
2014 election	Jono Naylor
2014 election	Darroch Ball
2017 election	Darroch Ball
2020 election	Teanau Tuiono
2023 election	Teanau Tuiono

== Election results ==
=== 2026 election ===
The next election will be held on 7 November 2026. Candidates for Palmerston North are listed at Candidates in the 2026 New Zealand general election by electorate § Palmerston North. Official results will be available after 27 November 2026.

=== 2023 election ===
2023 general election: Palmerston North
Notes:	Blue background denotes the winner of the electorate vote. Pink background denotes a candidate elected from their party list. Yellow background denotes an electorate win by a list member, or other incumbent. A ✓ or ✗ denotes status of any incumbent, win or lose respectively.						
Party	Candidate	Votes	%	±%	Party votes	%	±%
Labour	✓ Tangi Utikere	15,339	43.06	−16.50	11,293	31.30	−23.59
National	Ankit Bansal	12,252	34.39		12,195	33.80	+11.88
Green	Teanau Tuiono	3,162	8.87	+3.45	4,454	12.34	+4.93
ACT	Mike Harnett	2,841	7.97		2,970	8.23	+1.47
NZ Loyal	Dean Grant	1,016	2.85		437	1.21	
Animal Justice	Douglas Begg	402	1.12		96	0.26	
NZ First					2,242	6.21	+3.23
Opportunities					821	2.27	+0.32
Te Pāti Māori					625	1.73	+1.27
NewZeal					290	0.80	+0.51
Legalise Cannabis					199	0.55	+0.15
Freedoms NZ					77	0.21	
New Conservative					61	0.16	−1.65
DemocracyNZ					47	0.13	
Women's Rights					30	0.08	
Leighton Baker Party					23	0.06	
New Nation					17	0.04	
Informal votes		608			201		
Total valid votes		35,620			36,078		
Labour hold	Majority	3,087	8.66	−24.43			

=== 2020 election ===
2020 general election: Palmerston North
Notes:	Blue background denotes the winner of the electorate vote. Pink background denotes a candidate elected from their party list. Yellow background denotes an electorate win by a list member, or other incumbent. A ✓ or ✗ denotes status of any incumbent, win or lose respectively.						
Party	Candidate	Votes	%	±%	Party votes	%	±%
Labour	Tangi Utikere	22,516	59.56	+6.47	21,315	54.89	+13.52
National	William Wood	10,008	26.47	−8.11	8,513	21.92	−18.40
Green	Teanau Tuiono	2,049	5.42	−0.25	2,876	7.41	+1.29
ACT	Jack Phillips	1,192	3.15	—	2,626	6.76	+6.37
NZ First	Darroch Ball	875	2.31	−3.93	1,157	2.98	−4.84
New Conservative	David Poppelwell	733	1.94	—	704	1.81	+1.48
Advance NZ	Sharon Lyon	430	1.14	—	332	0.86	—
Opportunities					756	1.95	−0.72
Māori Party					177	0.46	+0.06
Legalise Cannabis					157	0.40	+0.13
ONE					112	0.29	—
Vision NZ					30	0.08	—
Sustainable NZ					24	0.06	—
Outdoors					21	0.05	±0.00
Social Credit					13	0.03	±0.00
TEA					10	0.03	—
Heartland					6	0.02	—
Informal votes		768			274		
Total valid votes		37,803			38,829		
Turnout		39,103	84.0	+3.39			
Labour hold	Majority	12,508	33.09	+14.58			

=== 2017 election ===
2017 general election: Palmerston North
Notes:	Blue background denotes the winner of the electorate vote. Pink background denotes a candidate elected from their party list. Yellow background denotes an electorate win by a list member, or other incumbent. A ✓ or ✗ denotes status of any incumbent, win or lose respectively.						
Party	Candidate	Votes	%	±%	Party votes	%	±%
Labour	✓ Iain Lees-Galloway	18,388	53.09	+3.39	14,648	41.37	+10.49
National	Adrienne Pierce	11,946	34.58	−8.61	14,276	40.32	−2.77
NZ First	Darroch Ball	2,155	6.24	+2.66	2,767	7.82	−0.82
Green	Thomas Nash	1,960	5.67	—	2,166	6.12	−3.73
Money Free	Scott Andrew	142	0.41	—			
Opportunities					944	2.67	—
Māori Party					141	0.40	−0.08
ACT					138	0.39	−0.12
Conservative					116	0.33	−4.17
Legalise Cannabis					96	0.27	−0.09
United Future					30	0.08	−0.15
Ban 1080					18	0.05	−0.04
People's Party					17	0.05	—
Outdoors					16	0.05	—
Mana Party					15	0.04	−0.92 (Note: 2017 Mana Party swing is relative to the votes for Internet-Mana in 2014; it shared a party list with the Internet Party in the 2014 election)
Democrats					11	0.03	±0.00
Internet					7	0.02	−0.94 (Note: 2017 Internet Party swing is relative to the votes for Internet-Mana in 2014; it shared a party list with Mana Party in the 2014 election)
Informal votes		471			139		
Total valid votes		34,551			35,406		
Turnout		35,545					
Labour hold	Majority	6,392	18.51	+12.00			

=== 2014 election ===
2014 general election: Palmerston North
Notes:	Blue background denotes the winner of the electorate vote. Pink background denotes a candidate elected from their party list. Yellow background denotes an electorate win by a list member, or other incumbent. A ✓ or ✗ denotes status of any incumbent, win or lose respectively.						
Party	Candidate	Votes	%	±%	Party votes	%	±%
Labour	✓ Iain Lees-Galloway	16,885	49.70	−1.62	10,632	30.88	−3.00
National	Jono Naylor	14,673	43.19	+2.07	14,835	43.09	−1.03
NZ First	Darroch Ball	1,217	3.58	+3.58	2,973	8.64	+2.98
Conservative	Mark Pearce	689	2.03	−0.07	1,549	4.50	+1.48
Internet	Pani Farvid	250	0.74	+0.74			
Green					3,390	9.85	−0.65
Internet Mana					330	0.96	+0.68 (Note: 2014 Internet Mana swing is relative to the votes for Mana in 2011; it shared a party list with Internet in the 2014 election.)
ACT					175	0.51	−0.23
Māori Party					166	0.48	−0.03
Legalise Cannabis					123	0.36	−0.12
United Future					80	0.23	−0.41
Ban 1080					30	0.09	+0.09
Civilian					24	0.07	+0.07
Democrats					10	0.03	−0.02
Independent Coalition					10	0.03	+0.03
Focus					7	0.02	+0.02
Informal votes		257			93		
Total valid votes		33,871			34,427		
Turnout		34,427	79.37	+3.46			
Labour hold	Majority	2,212	6.51	−3.69			

=== 2011 election ===
2011 general election: Palmerston North
Notes:	Blue background denotes the winner of the electorate vote. Pink background denotes a candidate elected from their party list. Yellow background denotes an electorate win by a list member, or other incumbent. A ✓ or ✗ denotes status of any incumbent, win or lose respectively.						
Party	Candidate	Votes	%	±%	Party votes	%	±%
Labour	✓ Iain Lees-Galloway	16,525	51.32	+4.50	11,194	33.88	−6.80
National	Leonie Hapeta	13,240	41.12	−2.43	14,577	44.12	+3.46
Green	Corrina Tucker	1,485	4.61	+0.19	3,469	10.50	+3.99
Conservative	Andrew Marquet	675	2.10	+2.10	997	3.02	+3.02
ACT	Daniel Stratton	167	0.52	−0.71	245	0.74	−1.99
United Future	Sultan Eusoff	109	0.34	−0.42	210	0.64	−0.60
NZ First					1,870	5.66	+1.61
Māori Party					168	0.51	−0.20
Legalise Cannabis					157	0.48	+0.07
Mana					94	0.28	+0.28
Alliance					23	0.07	+0.02
Libertarianz					19	0.06	+0.01
Democrats					15	0.05	+0.03
Informal votes		667			230		
Total valid votes		32,201			33,038		
Labour hold	Majority	3,285	10.20	+6.93			

Electorate (as at 26 November 2011): 43,524

=== 2008 election ===
2008 general election: Palmerston North
Notes:	Blue background denotes the winner of the electorate vote. Pink background denotes a candidate elected from their party list. Yellow background denotes an electorate win by a list member, or other incumbent. A ✓ or ✗ denotes status of any incumbent, win or lose respectively.						
Party	Candidate	Votes	%	±%	Party votes	%	±%
Labour	Iain Lees-Galloway	15,977	46.82		14,108	40.68	
National	Malcolm Plimmer	14,860	43.55		14,103	40.66	
Green	Lawrence O'Halloran	1,509	4.42		2,258	6.51	
NZ First	Graham Odering	658	1.93		1,404	4.05	
ACT	Kevin Dittmer	420	1.23		948	2.73	
Progressive	Debbie Lucas	261	0.76		408	1.18	
United Future	Frank Owen	259	0.76		430	1.24	
Independent	Grant Seton	107	0.31				
Independent	Arshad Chatha	74	0.22				
Bill and Ben					338	0.97	
Māori Party					247	0.71	
Legalise Cannabis					139	0.40	
Kiwi					117	0.34	
Family Party					89	0.26	
Pacific					37	0.11	
Alliance					16	0.05	
Libertarianz					16	0.05	
Workers Party					12	0.03	
Democrats					6	0.02	
RONZ					4	0.01	
RAM					2	0.01	
Informal votes		341			159		
Total valid votes		34,125			34,682		
Labour hold	Majority	1,117	3.27				

=== 2005 election ===
2005 general election: Palmerston North
Notes:	Blue background denotes the winner of the electorate vote. Pink background denotes a candidate elected from their party list. Yellow background denotes an electorate win by a list member, or other incumbent. A ✓ or ✗ denotes status of any incumbent, win or lose respectively.						
Party	Candidate	Votes	%	±%	Party votes	%	±%
Labour	✓ Steve Maharey	17,263	53.87		14,642	44.98	
National	Malcolm Plimmer	11,763	36.71		11,943	36.69	
Green	Lawrence O'Hallorahan	1,141	3.56		2,116	6.50	
NZ First	Graham Odering	853	2.66		1,673	5.14	
United Future	Gary Pedersen	627	1.96		1,071	3.29	
Progressive	Dawn Patchett	251	0.78		370	1.14	
Independent	Archard Chatha	147	0.46				
ACT					285	0.88	
Māori Party					161	0.49	
Destiny					116	0.36	
Legalise Cannabis					59	0.18	
Christian Heritage					49	0.15	
Libertarianz					18	0.06	
Alliance					14	0.04	
99 MP					10	0.03	
One NZ					7	0.02	
Democrats					6	0.02	
Direct Democracy					6	0.02	
RONZ					4	0.01	
Family Rights					2	0.01	
Informal votes		276			105		
Total valid votes		35,460			35,983		
Labour hold	Majority	5,500	17.16				

=== 1999 election ===
Refer to Candidates in the New Zealand general election 1999 by electorate#Palmerston North for a list of candidates.

=== 1993 election ===
1993 general election: Palmerston North
Party	Candidate	Votes	%	±%
Labour	Steve Maharey	9,049	46.24	+4.29
National	Barbara Stones	5,285	27.00	
Alliance	Gerard Hehir	3,474	17.75	
NZ First	Graham Odering	1,220	6.23	
Christian Heritage	Kay Burgess	413	2.11	+1.44
Natural Law	Tony Martin	66	0.33	
Independent	Pat Goaley	48	0.24	+0.02
Independent	Evan Matthew Nattrass	40	0.20	
Majority		3,764	19.23	+17.47
Turnout		19,569	83.25	+1.02
Registered electors		23,504		

=== 1990 election ===
1990 general election: Palmerston North
Party	Candidate	Votes	%	±%
Labour	Steve Maharey	8,283	41.95	
National	Paul Sherriff	7,934	40.18	
Green	Ashok Parbhu	1,465	7.41	
Social Credit	Bruce Beetham	851	4.31	
NewLabour	B J Short	701	3.55	
Christian Heritage	Kay Burgess	359	1.81	
Democrats	S A M Collins	107	0.54	
Independent	Pat Goaley	44	0.22	
Majority		349	1.76	
Turnout		19,744	84.27	−3.52
Registered electors		23,429		

=== 1987 election ===
1987 general election: Palmerston North
Party	Candidate	Votes	%	±%
Labour	Trevor de Cleene	11,192	56.20	+5.85
National	Paul Curry	7,955	39.95	
Democrats	Jacqueline Lush	505	2.53	
McGillicuddy Serious	N G Colless	170	0.85	
NZ Party	E B Halford	90	0.45	
Majority		3,327	16.70	+1.94
Turnout		19,912	87.79	−4.16
Registered electors		22,681		

=== 1984 election ===
1984 general election: Palmerston North
Party	Candidate	Votes	%	±%
Labour	Trevor de Cleene	10,341	50.35	+1.88
National	Colleen Singleton	7,308	35.58	
NZ Party	Carol Coupler	2,123	10.33	
Social Credit	Bobbie Smith	765	3.72	
Majority		3,033	14.76	+4.95
Turnout		20,537	91.95	+1.99
Registered electors		22,333		

=== 1981 election ===
1981 general election: Palmerston North
Party	Candidate	Votes	%	±%
Labour	Trevor de Cleene	10,425	48.47	
National	Brian Elwood	8,315	38.66	
Social Credit	Jacqueline Lush	2,567	11.93	
Values	Hone Te Kaa	113	0.52	
Independent	W J Harris	87	0.40	
Majority		2,110	9.81	
Turnout		21,507	89.96	+22.56
Registered electors		23,905		

=== 1978 election ===
1978 general election: Palmerston North
Party	Candidate	Votes	%	±%
Labour	Joe Walding	10,629	49.02	+6.35
National	John Lithgow	7,893	36.40	−6.97
Social Credit	Peter Edmonds	2,558	11.79	+4.63
Values	George Ferdinand Serrallich	551	2.54	
Tory	Andrew John Smith	48	0.22	
Majority		2,736	12.62	
Turnout		21,679	67.40	−16.25
Registered electors		32,162		

=== 1975 election ===
1975 general election: Palmerston North
Party	Candidate	Votes	%	±%
National	John Lithgow	8,801	43.37	
Labour	Joe Walding	8,659	42.67	−7.89
Social Credit	Peter Edmonds	1,453	7.16	
Values	Neil Rennie	1,378	6.79	
Majority		142	0.69	
Turnout		20,291	83.65	−6.03
Registered electors		24,257		

=== 1972 election ===
1972 general election: Palmerston North
Party	Candidate	Votes	%	±%
Labour	Joe Walding	8,888	50.56	+3.52
National	Paul William Mitchell	7,122	40.51	
Social Credit	B K Harper	694	3.94	
Values	D J Woodhams	676	3.84	
Mad Hatter's Tea Party	Mickey Mouse (Note: Candidate Chris Lawrence changed his name on the ballot to "Mickey Mouse".)	76	0.43	
New Democratic	L A Inglis	32	0.18	
Majority		1,766	10.04	+9.15
Turnout		17,579	89.68	−1.50
Registered electors		19,600		

Table footnotes:

=== 1969 election ===
1969 general election: Palmerston North
Party	Candidate	Votes	%	±%
Labour	Joe Walding	8,492	47.04	+3.10
National	Gordon Cruden	8,331	46.15	+5.96
Social Credit	Les Hunter	1,229	6.80	
Majority		161	0.89	−2.86
Turnout		18,052	91.18	+14.79
Registered electors		19,797		

=== 1967 by-election ===
1967 Palmerston North by-election
Party	Candidate	Votes	%	±%
Labour	Joe Walding	6,939	43.94	−0.56
National	Gordon Cruden	6,347	40.19	
Social Credit	John O'Brien	2,410	15.26	
Democratic Labour	Jamie Wedderspoon	61	0.39	
Democratic Progress	J Q Goldingham	34	0.22	
Majority		592	3.75	
Turnout		15,791	76.39	−12.56
Registered electors		19,873		
Labour gain from National		Swing		

=== 1966 election ===
1966 general election: Palmerston North
Party	Candidate	Votes	%	±%
National	Bill Brown	7,865	46.01	−3.17
Labour	Joe Walding	7,606	44.50	
Social Credit	George Thew	1,620	9.47	
Majority		259	1.51	−3.20
Turnout		17,091	88.95	−2.62
Registered electors		19,213		

=== 1963 election ===
1963 general election: Palmerston North
Party	Candidate	Votes	%	±%
National	Bill Brown	8,047	49.18	+2.74
Labour	Philip Skoglund	7,275	44.46	+1.15
Social Credit	T A Greenwood	815	4.98	
Liberal	Reginald Joseph Pedley	165	1.00	
Communist	Gordon Allison	58	0.35	
Majority		772	4.71	+3.88
Turnout		16,360	91.57	+0.90
Registered electors		17,865		

=== 1960 election ===
1960 general election: Palmerston North
Party	Candidate	Votes	%	±%
National	Bill Brown	7,401	46.44	+4.17
Labour	Philip Skoglund	7,268	45.61	−5.58
Social Credit	Roy Gunn	1,186	7.44	
Communist	Frederick William Manning	79	0.49	
Majority		133	0.83	
Turnout		15,934	90.67	−2.51
Registered electors		17,572		

=== 1957 election ===
1957 general election: Palmerston North
Party	Candidate	Votes	%	±%
Labour	Philip Skoglund	7,931	51.19	+2.94
National	Bill Brown	6,583	42.49	
Social Credit	Henry Harold Egmont Kensington	978	6.31	
Majority		1,348	8.70	+6.37
Turnout		15,492	93.18	−0.89
Registered electors		16,625		

=== 1954 election ===
1954 general election: Palmerston North
Party	Candidate	Votes	%	±%
Labour	Philip Skoglund	7,160	48.25	
National	Blair Tennent	6,814	45.92	−4.77
Social Credit	Sydney Wood	863	5.81	
Majority		346	2.33	
Turnout		14,837	94.07	+4.02
Registered electors		15,772		

=== 1951 election ===
1951 general election: Palmerston North
Party	Candidate	Votes	%	±%
National	Blair Tennent	7,288	50.69	−1.13
Labour	Joe Hodgens	7,088	49.31	
Majority		200	1.39	−2.25
Turnout		14,376	90.05	−3.12
Registered electors		15,964		

=== 1949 election ===
1949 general election: Palmerston North
Party	Candidate	Votes	%	±%
National	Blair Tennent	7,368	51.82	
Labour	Ormond Wilson	6,850	48.17	−5.25
Majority		518	3.64	
Turnout		14,218	93.17	+0.17
Registered electors		15,260		

=== 1946 election ===
1946 general election: Palmerston North
Party	Candidate	Votes	%	±%
Labour	Ormond Wilson	7,237	53.42	
Independent	Gus Mansford	6,309	46.57	−0.08
Majority		928	6.85	
Turnout		13,546	93.00	+1.92
Registered electors		14,565		

=== 1943 election ===
1943 general election: Palmerston North
Party	Candidate	Votes	%	±%
Labour	Joe Hodgens	7,346	48.03	−9.24
Independent	Gus Mansford	7,134	46.65	
Democratic Labour	Sydney Hindmarsh	613	4.00	
Informal votes		199	1.30	+0.86
Majority		212	1.38	−13.60
Turnout		15,292	91.08	+2.41
Registered electors		16,789		

=== 1938 election ===
1938 general election: Palmerston North
Party	Candidate	Votes	%	±%
Labour	Joe Hodgens	8,093	57.27	+22.81
National	Jimmy Nash	5,975	42.28	+10.37
Informal votes		63	0.44	+0.02
Majority		2,118	14.98	+14.15
Turnout		14,131	88.67	−1.33
Registered electors		15,936		

=== 1935 election ===
1935 general election: Palmerston
Party	Candidate	Votes	%	±%
Labour	Joe Hodgens	4,730	34.46	−10.31
Independent	Gus Mansford	4,615	33.62	
Reform	Jimmy Nash	4,380	31.91	−23.42
Informal votes		58	0.42	−0.15
Majority		115	0.83	
Turnout		13,725	90.00	+6.18
Registered electors		15,249		

=== 1931 election ===
1931 general election: Palmerston
Party	Candidate	Votes	%	±%
Reform	Jimmy Nash	6,465	55.33	+5.92
Labour	Joe Hodgens	5,220	44.67	
Majority		1,245	10.65	−10.23
Informal votes		67	0.57	−1.07
Turnout		11,752	83.82	−3.88
Registered electors		14,020		

=== 1928 election ===
1928 general election: Palmerston
Party	Candidate	Votes	%	±%
Reform	Jimmy Nash	5,558	49.40	−16.91
Labour	Walter Bromley	3,208	28.52	−5.17
United	Charles Loughnan (Note: Charles Loughnan (died 1955), younger brother of Robert and Henry Loughnan, was the founder of Loughnan and Jacobs, solicitors in Palmerston North, now Jacobs Florentine.)	2,484	22.08	
Majority		2,350	20.89	−11.75
Informal votes		188	1.64	−0.44
Turnout		11,438	87.71	−2.04
Registered electors		13,041		

Table footnotes:

=== 1925 election ===
1925 general election: Palmerston
Party	Candidate	Votes	%	±%
Reform	Jimmy Nash	6,584	66.32	
Labour	Walter Bromley	3,344	33.68	
Majority		3,240	32.63	
Informal votes		211	2.08	
Turnout		10,139	89.75	
Registered electors		11,297		

=== 1919 election ===
1919 general election: Palmerston
Party	Candidate	Votes	%	±%
Reform	Jimmy Nash	4,617	54.94	+13.38
Labour	Moses Ayrton	3,613	42.99	
Informal votes		173	2.05	
Majority		1,004	11.94	+6.07
Turnout		8,403		

=== 1918 by-election ===
1918 Palmerston by-election
Party	Candidate	Votes	%	±%
Reform	Jimmy Nash	2,229	41.56	
Labour	Alexander Galbraith	1,914	35.68	
Liberal	Ernest Hugh Crabb	1,119	20.86	
Independent Reform	A. Buchanan	101	1.88	
Majority		315	5.87	
Turnout		5,363		

=== 1899 election ===
1899 general election: Palmerston
Party	Candidate	Votes	%	±%
Independent Liberal	Frederick Pirani	1,980	48.49	−2.30
Liberal	William Thomas Wood	1,465	35.88	
Conservative	David Buick	638	15.63	−33.58
Majority		515	12.61	+11.03
Turnout		4,083	76.32	−2.90
Registered electors		5,350		

=== 1890 election ===
1890 general election: Palmerston
Party	Candidate	Votes	%	±%
Conservative	James Wilson	1,055	43.14	
Liberal–Labour	Frederick Pirani	994	40.65	
Liberal	John Stevens	396	16.19	
Majority		61	2.49	
Turnout		2,445	63.55	
Registered electors		3,847		
