= Gus Mansford =

New Zealand mayor (1885-1962)

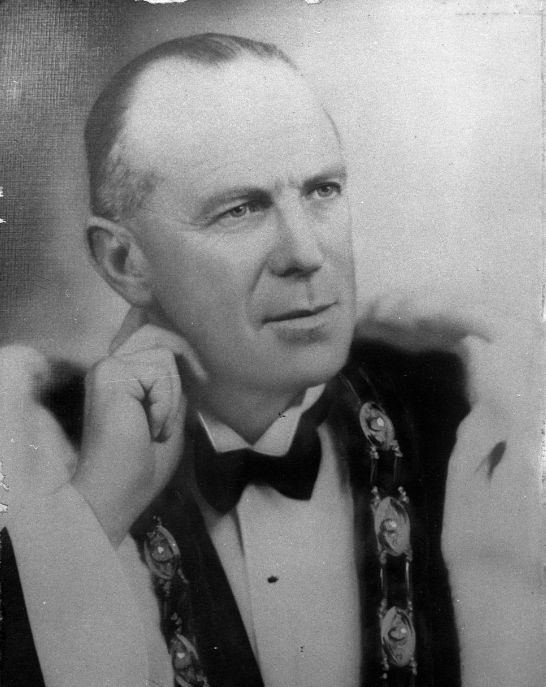
Mansford in c. 1932

Augustus Edward Cheesman Craig Mansford OBE (27 September 1885 – 13 June 1962) was Mayor of Palmerston North (New Zealand) from 1931 to 1947; the longest-serving mayor in the city's history.

== Early life ==
Mansford was born in 1885 at Suffolk Villa in Wellington. His father was Alfred Edward Nelson (died 1921) and his mother was Jessie Graham Mansford (née Cheesman, 1851–1898). Gus Mansford had two younger siblings; his sister Ellen was born in 1887 and his brother Thomas was born in 1890. Mansford received his education at Nelson College.

In 1906, Mansford moved to Palmerston North. On 4 May 1907, he married Margaret Anne Douley (listed as Donley in Who's Who in New Zealand).

== Sport ==
Mansford played cricket; first for Nelson and then (from 1907) for Manawatu. He held an Australasian record for cycling.

== Business ==
In October 1906, Mansford bought an auctioneering business in Palmerston North from Henry Munro. The owners of the auctioneering business—including Mansford—sold the business in November 1907. Subsequently, Mansford worked as an accountant.

== Public service ==
Mansford first stood for the Palmerston North Borough Council at the April 1927 local election and was successful. In 1929, Mansford first stood for the Hospital Board and topped the poll.

Mansford first contested the Palmerston North mayoralty at the May 1931 local election and had a clear victory over the other candidate, Meldrum Alfred Eliott. At the subsequent mayoral elections in 1933 and 1935, Mansford was returned unopposed. At the 1938 local election, Mansford was challenged by a Labour Party candidate, Victor Alexander Christensen, for the mayoralty but regained his position with a substantial majority. At the 1941 local election, Mansford was challenged by Clarence Robert Murphy (Labour) and Blair Tennent (National) for the mayoralty but he was once again successful. At the 1944 local election, Mansford was declared elected unopposed.

Mansford contested the Palmerston electorate (later Palmerston North electorate) three times as an independent, and on all three occasions he was defeated by the Labour Party candidate. At the 1935 election, Joe Hodgens defeated Mansford by a small margin. The incumbent, Jimmy Nash of the Reform Party, came third and this defeat caused ongoing friction between Mansford and the National Party (Reform renamed as National in 1936). At the 1943 election, Hodgens narrowly defeated Mansford in another three-way contest. At the 1946 election, Mansford was defeated by Ormond Wilson in a two-way contest.

In 1936, Mansford was first appointed to the council of Massey Agricultural College. In 1947, he was chairman of the council before he retired at the end of the year.

Mansford was appointed an Officer of the Order of the British Empire in the 1946 New Year Honours, for patriotic and social welfare services. In 1953, he was awarded the Queen Elizabeth II Coronation Medal.

== Death ==
Mansford died on 13 June 1962 and was interred at Kelvin Grove Cemetery. His wife died on 3 September 1963 and was buried next to him.
