= Mount Loughnan =

Mountain in New Zealand

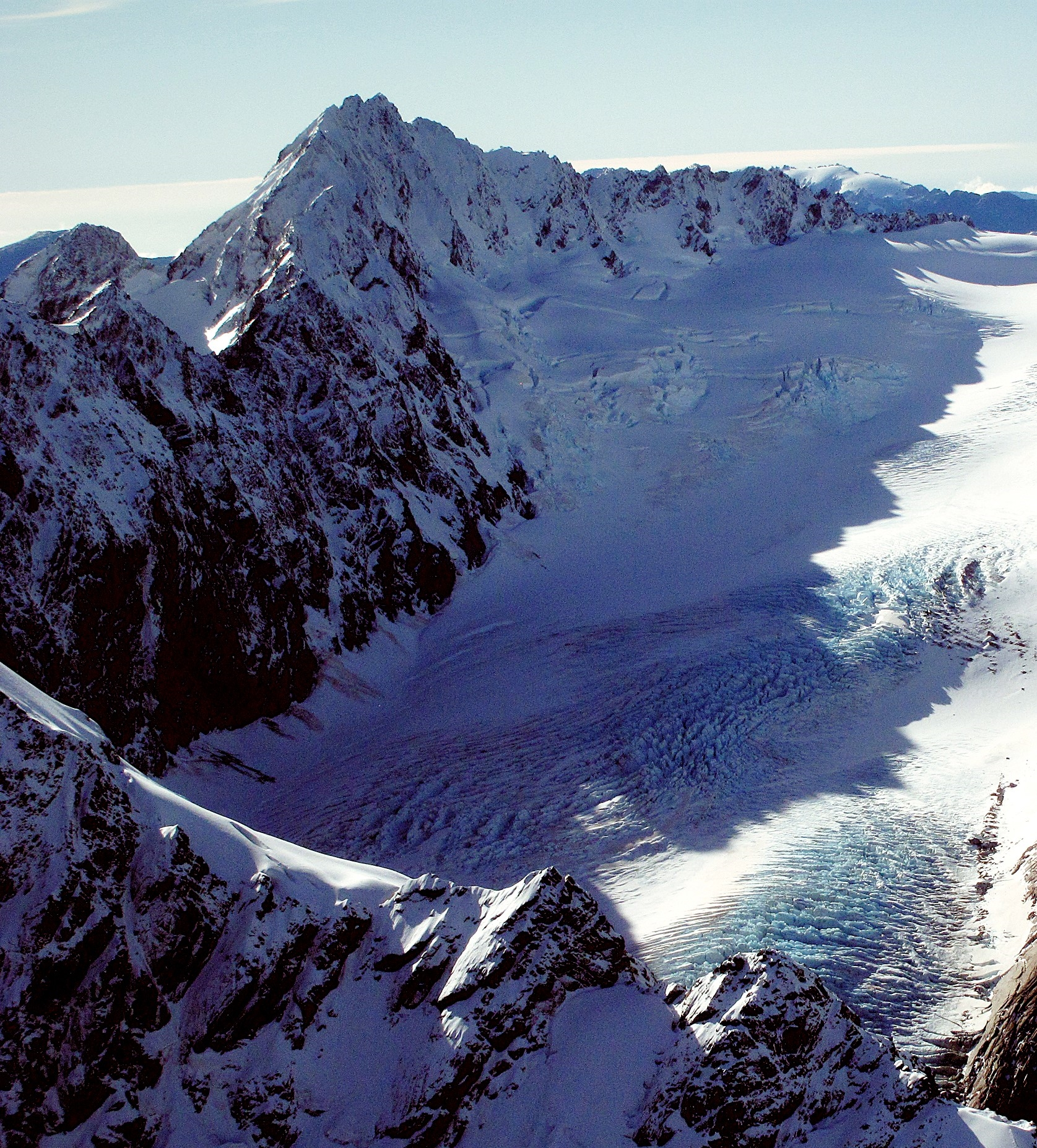
- South aspect, with Grey Glacier

Highest point
- Elevation: 2,590 m (8,497 ft)
- Prominence: 350 m (1,148 ft)
- Isolation: 3.42 km (2.13 mi)
- Listing: Highest mountains of New Zealand
- Coordinates: 43°26′03″S 170°28′32″E

Geography
- Location within New Zealand
- Interactive map of Mount Loughnan
- Location: South Island
- Country: New Zealand
- Region: Canterbury / West Coast
- Protected area: Aoraki / Mount Cook National Park
- Parent range: Southern Alps
- Topo map(s): NZMS260 I35; Topo50 BX16

Climbing
- First ascent: 1935

Mount Loughnan is a 2,590-metre-elevation (8,497-foot) mountain in New Zealand.

== Description ==
Mount Loughnan is situated on the crest of the Southern Alps and on the northern boundary of Aoraki / Mount Cook National Park. It is located 190 kilometres (118 mi) west of the city of Christchurch and set on the common boundary shared by the Canterbury and West Coast Regions of South Island. Precipitation runoff from the mountain drains west into the Butler River and east to the Godley River. Topographic relief is significant as the summit rises 2,000 metres (6,562 feet) above the Butler River in three kilometres. The first ascent of the summit was made on 29 December 1935 by J. Shanks, D.A. Carty, H. Smith, and L. Dumbleton via the Grey Glacier and North East Ridge. The nearest higher peak is Mount Moffat, three kilometres to the south-southwest.

== Climbing ==
Climbing routes on Mount Loughnan:

- Grey Glacier – J. Shanks, D.A. Carty, H. Smith, L. Dumbleton – (1935)
- South Ridge – John Harrison, B.H. (Snow) Williams, Laurie Osborne, Bruce Waterhouse – (1954)
- North West Flank – Don French, Paul Richardson – (1982)

== Climate ==
Based on the Köppen climate classification, Mount Loughnan is located in a marine west coast (Cfb) climate zone, with a tundra climate at the summit. Prevailing westerly winds blow moist air from the Tasman Sea onto the mountains, where the air is forced upward by the mountains (orographic lift), causing moisture to drop in the form of rain or snow. This climate supports the Grey and Nansen glaciers on this mountain's slopes. The months of December through February offer the most favourable weather for viewing or climbing this peak.

== Gallery ==
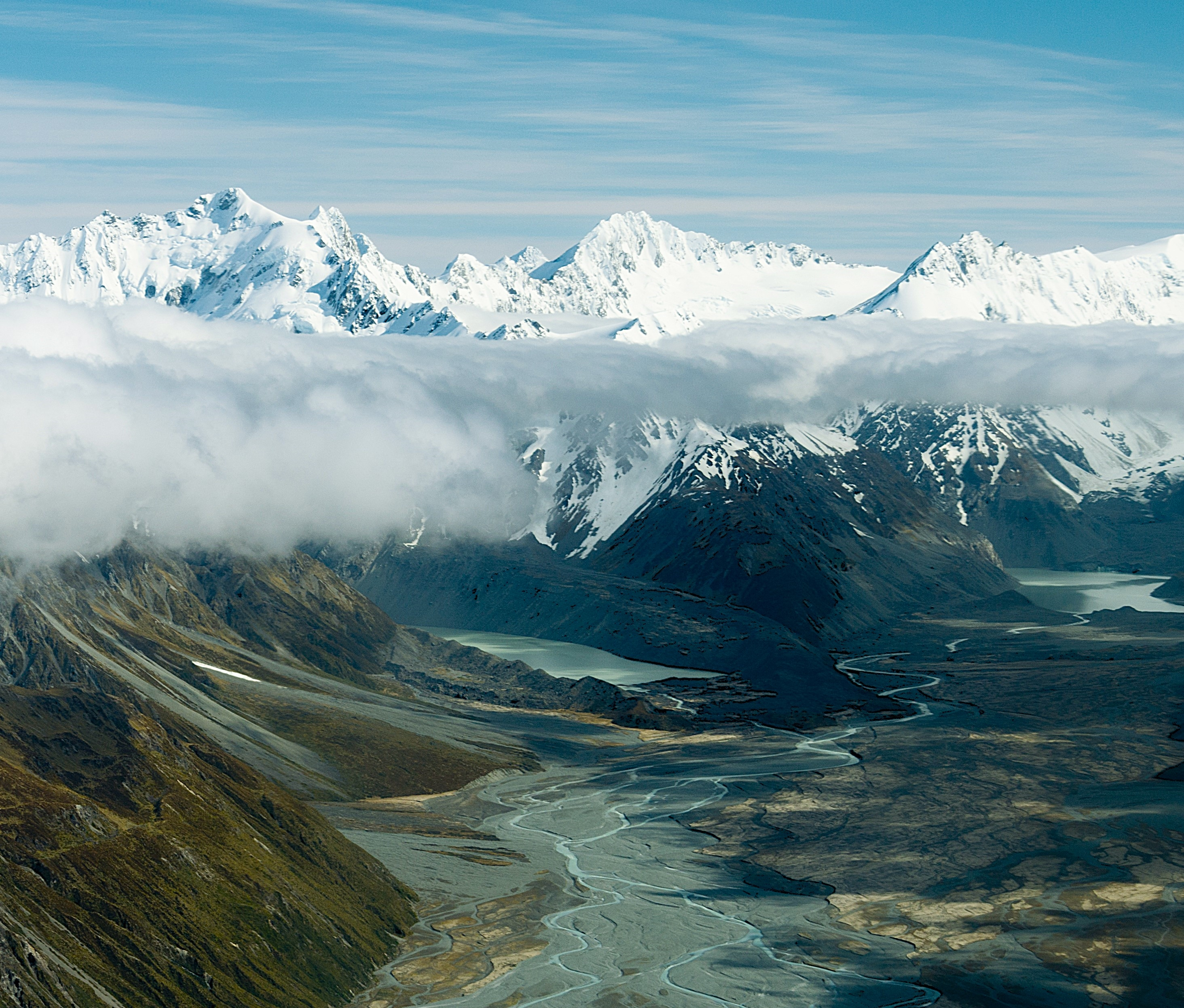
Godley River Valley with Mount Loughnan centred and Mount Moffat to left

== See also ==
- List of mountains of New Zealand by height
- Robert Loughnan
- Henry Loughnan
