= Ormond Wilson =

New Zealand politician

Ormond Wilson CMG
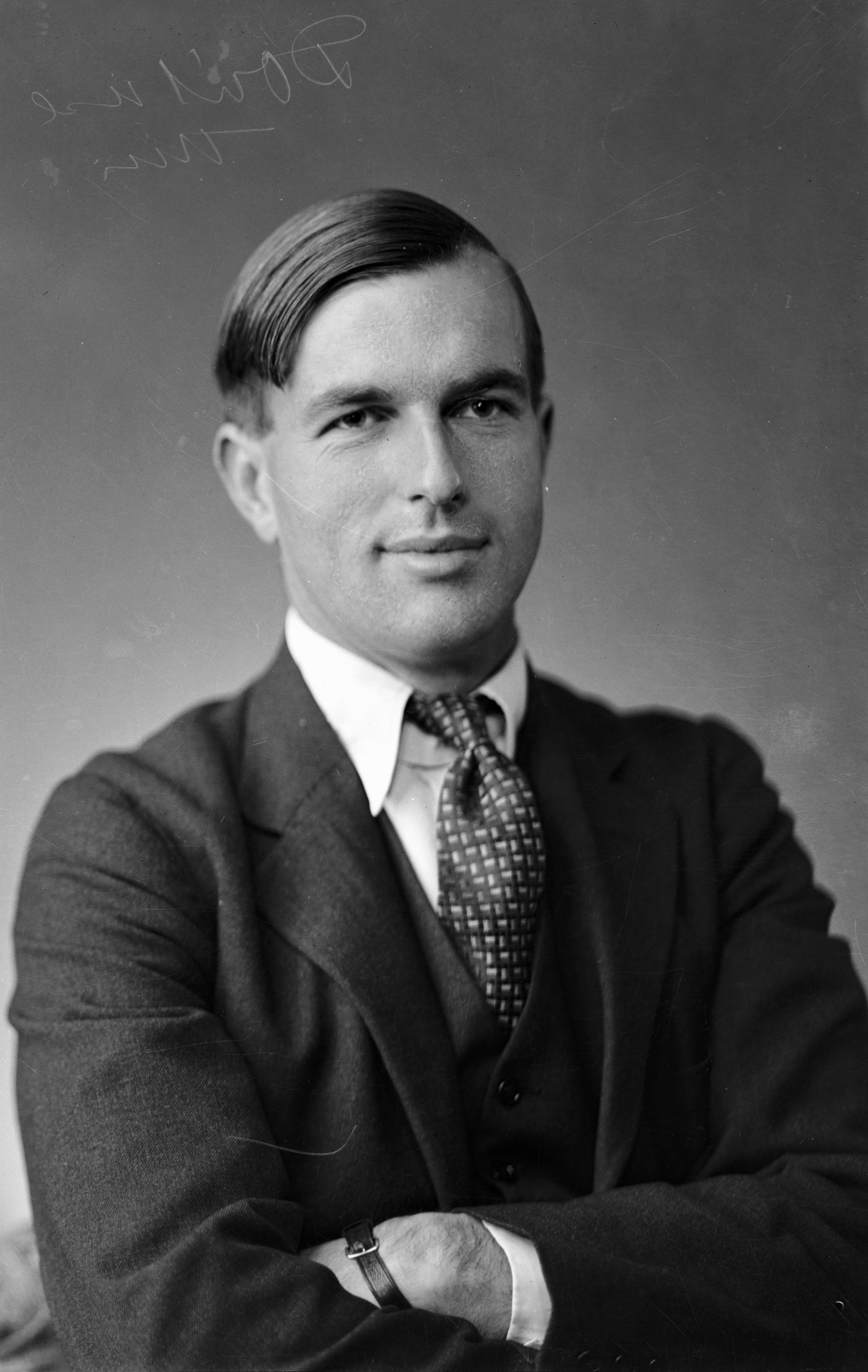
- Ormond Wilson, ca 1938

Member of the New Zealand Parliament for Rangitikei
- In office 1935–1938
- Preceded by: Alexander Stuart
- Succeeded by: Edward Gordon

Member of the New Zealand Parliament for Palmerston North
- In office 1946–1949
- Preceded by: Joe Hodgens
- Succeeded by: Blair Tennent

Personal details
- Born: 18 November 1907 Bulls, New Zealand
- Died: 17 April 1988 (aged 80) Wellington, New Zealand
- Party: Labour Party
- Spouse(s): Margery Wace (m. 1940; d. 1944); Rosamond Russell (née Rolleston) (m. 1946; d. 1980)
- Relations: Frank Wilson (son); Frank Rolleston (father-in-law); James Wilson (grandfather); John Davies Ormond (grandfather); James Wilson (great-uncle)
- Education: Lincoln College, Oxford

George Hamish Ormond Wilson CMG (18 November 1907 – 17 April 1988) was a New Zealand Member of Parliament representing the Labour Party, farmer, historian, author and chairman of the Historic Places Trust. He donated 30 acres of bush and his homestead to the Crown, which is now administered by the Manawatū District Council.

== Early life ==
Ormond Wilson was born in Bulls in 1907, the son of (George) Hamish Wilson and Ada Mary Ormond. The MPs Sir James Wilson and John Davies Ormond were his grandfathers. His great uncle was the MP James Wilson, Financial Secretary to the Treasury and the founder of the economist and chartered banks of Australia, India, and China.

He had severe hay fever and as a child, he spent his summers in a hostel on Mount Egmont in order to be less exposed to pollen. As a twelve-year-old, the family spent half a year in London. On their return, Wilson was sent to Christ's College, Christchurch as a boarder (1922–1924). After the fifth form, he went to Surrey in preparation for study at Lincoln College, Oxford, from where he graduated in 1930.

When he returned to New Zealand, he found that he had inherited his grandfather's 320 hectares (3.2 km^{2}) farm, Mt Lees, located between Bulls and Sanson. He was unprepared for life as a farmer, but he grew into the role. After he lost his seat in Parliament, he travelled extensively. First, he went to Washington in March 1939 for three days, where he met with Labour leaders, Congressmen, Senators and columnists; he was surprised how much interests was shown in him as a former Member of Parliament. Wilson sent his impressions to Christchurch for publication in the journal Tomorrow. He then visited Britain, where he met with old friends from his university days, and the journalists Kingsley Martin and Dick Crossman of the New Statesman. He visited the House of Commons, met with Labour leaders and was invited to their 1939 party conference in Southport as a guest. Travelling via Scandinavia, he obtained a visa for the Soviet Union and experienced an oppressive totalitarian socialist state first hand (he got into trouble taking a tourist photo of a photogenic building). He then spent four days in Berlin in August 1939, but with war coming, he returned to the UK. He prepared a broadcast covering his travels for the BBC and this led to a job with the BBC Overseas Service in London.

He married Margery Wace on 29 September 1940 in Ardingly, Sussex; she was his superior at the Overseas Service. They had one daughter; Cecilia. His wife died during labour with their second child in 1944. Wilson returned to New Zealand with his young daughter. On 8 January 1946, he married at Napier the war widow Rosamond Russell (née Rolleston), a daughter of Frank Rolleston and granddaughter of William Rolleston; both her father and grandfathers had served as Members of Parliament. His second wife had one son and two daughters. They had known each other from Wilson's time in Christchurch and he had made an earlier marriage proposal to her, which she rejected. Together, they had one son (Francis).

== Member of Parliament ==
New Zealand Parliament
Years	Term	Electorate	Party
1935–1938	25th	Rangitikei	Labour
1946–1949	28th	Palmerston North	Labour

Ormond Wilson met Labour Party MPs (Harry Holland, Michael Joseph Savage and James McCombs) at a luncheon at Government House hosted by the Governor-General Lord Bledisloe. McCombs said to Holland about this encounter: "I think I've found a comrade." He strengthened his connection with the Labour Party and became close friends with Walter Nash and Tim Armstrong. He was nominated for the Rangitikei electorate and contested the 1935 election against the incumbent Alexander Stuart of the Reform Party. Wilson won the conservative electorate with a majority of 907 votes. At the time of election he was 28; the youngest Labour MP in Parliament.

By the next election in 1938, boundary changes had resulted in the loss of the urban part of Wanganui from the electorate, which was now fully rural. Although Labour obtained a landslide victory in the election, Wilson lost against Edward Gordon of the National Party by 300 votes.

Wilson returned from overseas and was nominated in the Palmerston North electorate for the 1946 election by Labour. His opponent was Gus Mansford, who had been Mayor of Palmerston North since 1931. Mansford had a strained relationship with the National Party, since his 1935 election campaign in the Palmerston North electorate had contributed to the defeat of Jimmy Nash. Mansford failed to get nominated by the National Party for the 1938 and 1943 elections. So in 1946, the National Party decided not to stand a candidate, with Mansford running as an independent. Wilson obtained a majority of 928 votes in this two-person contest. Wilson lost the subsequent election in 1949 against Blair Tennent of the National Party.

== Later life and death ==
Wilson was Chairman of the Historic Places Trust 1958–1970 and Chairman of the Board of Trustees of the National Art Gallery and Museum 1975–1979. He published An Outsider Looks Back...Reflections on Experience in 1982, and two books in 1985, From Hongi Hika to Hone Heke and The Story of Mount Lees Reserve. The Wilsons gave their homestead and bush to the Crown and moved to Wellington in 1972; Mount Lees Reserve is now one of the most important natural areas administered by Manawatū District Council. His wife had already published a biography on her paternal grandparents. They then published a biography for his maternal grandfather, John Davies Ormond, in 1980. Rosamond Wilson was killed in a car crash in late 1980.

Wilson was appointed a Companion of the Order of St Michael and St George in the 1979 Queen's Birthday Honours, for services as chairman of the Historic Places Trust and the board of trustees of the National Art Gallery and Museum. He died in Bowen Hospital on 17 April 1988, following an earlier stroke.

== Notes ==
New Zealand Parliament
Preceded by Alexander Stuart	Member of Parliament for Rangitikei; 1935–1938	Succeeded by Edward Gordon
Preceded by Joe Hodgens	Member of Parliament for Palmerston North; 1946–1949	Succeeded by Blair Tennent
