= Tangi Utikere =

New Zealand politician

Tangi Utikere JP MP
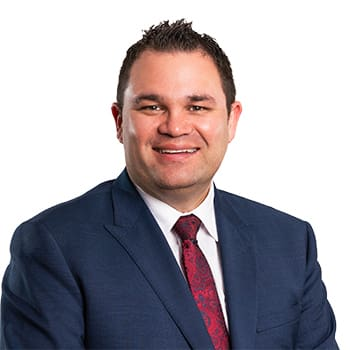

Member of the New Zealand Parliament for Palmerston North
- Incumbent
- Assumed office 17 October 2020
- Preceded by: Iain Lees-Galloway

Deputy Mayor of Palmerston North
- In office 26 October 2016 – 18 October 2020
- Mayor: Grant Smith
- Preceded by: Duncan McCann
- Succeeded by: Aleisha Rutherford

Palmerston North City Councillor
- In office 9 October 2010 – 18 October 2020
- Preceded by: Multi-member district
- Succeeded by: Orphée Mickalad

Personal details
- Born: 1979 or 1980 (age 46–47) Palmerston North, New Zealand
- Party: Labour

Tangi William Edward Utikere (born c. 1980) is a New Zealand politician, and Member of Parliament for Palmerston North since 2020. He was the deputy mayor of Palmerston North from 2016 to 2020, being the first non-New Zealand European to serve in that role.

== Early life and professional career ==
Utikere was born and educated in Palmerston North and is of Cook Islands descent. In 1997 he was a member of the New Zealand Youth Parliament, selected to represent List MP Jill White. In 2002, he completed a Bachelor of Arts with a double major in Politics and Social Policy at Massey University. The following year, Utikere attained a Graduate Diploma in Teaching (Secondary). He later taught at Freyberg High School as a history teacher, and is also a Justice of the peace and marriage celebrant. On 2 June 2020, Utikere was appointed as a member of the New Zealand Criminal Cases Review Commission.

== Political career ==
New Zealand Parliament
Years	Term	Electorate	List	Party
2020–2023	53rd	Palmerston North	none	Labour
2023–2026	54th	Palmerston North	25	Labour
2026–present	55th	Palmerston North	14	Labour

=== Early political career ===
Utikere unsuccessfully contested the Labour nomination for the Palmerston North electorate following the retirement of Steve Maharey in 2008, losing to Iain Lees-Galloway.

He was first elected to the Palmerston North City Council in 2010, and was re-elected in 2013. In 2015 he unsuccessfully ran for Mayor, coming second behind Grant Smith. He was re-elected to the City Council in 2016 and in 2019 was re-elected as the city's highest polling city councillor. In 2016 he was appointed as deputy mayor.

On 26 July 2020 Utikere was selected as Labour's candidate for the Palmerston North electorate following the announcement that Iain Lees-Galloway would not be standing. During the election campaign he donated his deputy mayor's salary to the city's Mayoral Relief Fund.

=== First term, 2020–2023 ===
During the 2020 New Zealand general election held on 17 October, Utikere won the Palmerston North seat, retaining it for Labour by a margin of 12,508 votes and nearly doubling Lees-Galloway's lead during the 2017 New Zealand general election.

In February 2021 a by-election was held to fill his vacant seat on the city council, it was won by Orphée Mickalad.

In July 2021, his Member's Bill requiring all local council elected members to publicly declare their pecuniary interests on a Register, was drawn from the ballot. It was passed into law by Parliament in May 2022.

Having served on Parliament's Governance and Administration and Environment select committees, Utikere became the Chairperson of the Health Select Committee on 4 May 2022. In a January 2023 Cabinet reshuffle, Prime Minister Chris Hipkins appointed Utikere as Chief Government Whip.

=== Second term, 2023–2026 ===
During the 2023 New Zealand general election, Utikere retained the Palmerston North electorate by a margin of 3,087 votes. He became Chief Whip, spokesperson for transport, oceans and fisheries, and associate spokesperson for education (Pacific) in the Shadow Cabinet of Chris Hipkins. Following Grant Robertson's announcement that he was retiring from politics Utikere picked up the Racing portfolio.

Following a cabinet reshuffle in early March 2025, Utikere retained the transport and racing portfolios and gained the local government and small business portfolios. He lost the Oceans and Fisheries, and Associate Education (Pacific) portfolios. He moved up in ranking from 19th to 12th place.

During a cabinet reshuffle on 11 March 2026, Utikere became the Deputy Shadow Leader of the House and gained the state-owned enterprises portfolio. He retained the local government, transport and racing portfolios.

=== Third term, 2026–present ===
During the 2026 New Zealand general election, Utikere was ranked 14th on the Labour Party list. He contested the Palmerston North electorate. Based on preliminary results, Utikere retained Palmerston North for Labour by a comfortable margin of 2,933 votes on 7 November.

New Zealand Parliament
Preceded by Iain Lees-Galloway	Member of Parliament for Palmerston North; 2020–present	Incumbent
Political offices
Preceded by Duncan McCann	Deputy Mayor of Palmerston North; 2016–2020	Succeeded by Aleisha Rutherford
Party political offices
Preceded by Duncan Webb	Senior Whip of the Labour Party; 2023–present	Incumbent
