= 1918 Palmerston by-election =

New Zealand by-election

- 3 October 1918
- Turnout: 5,363
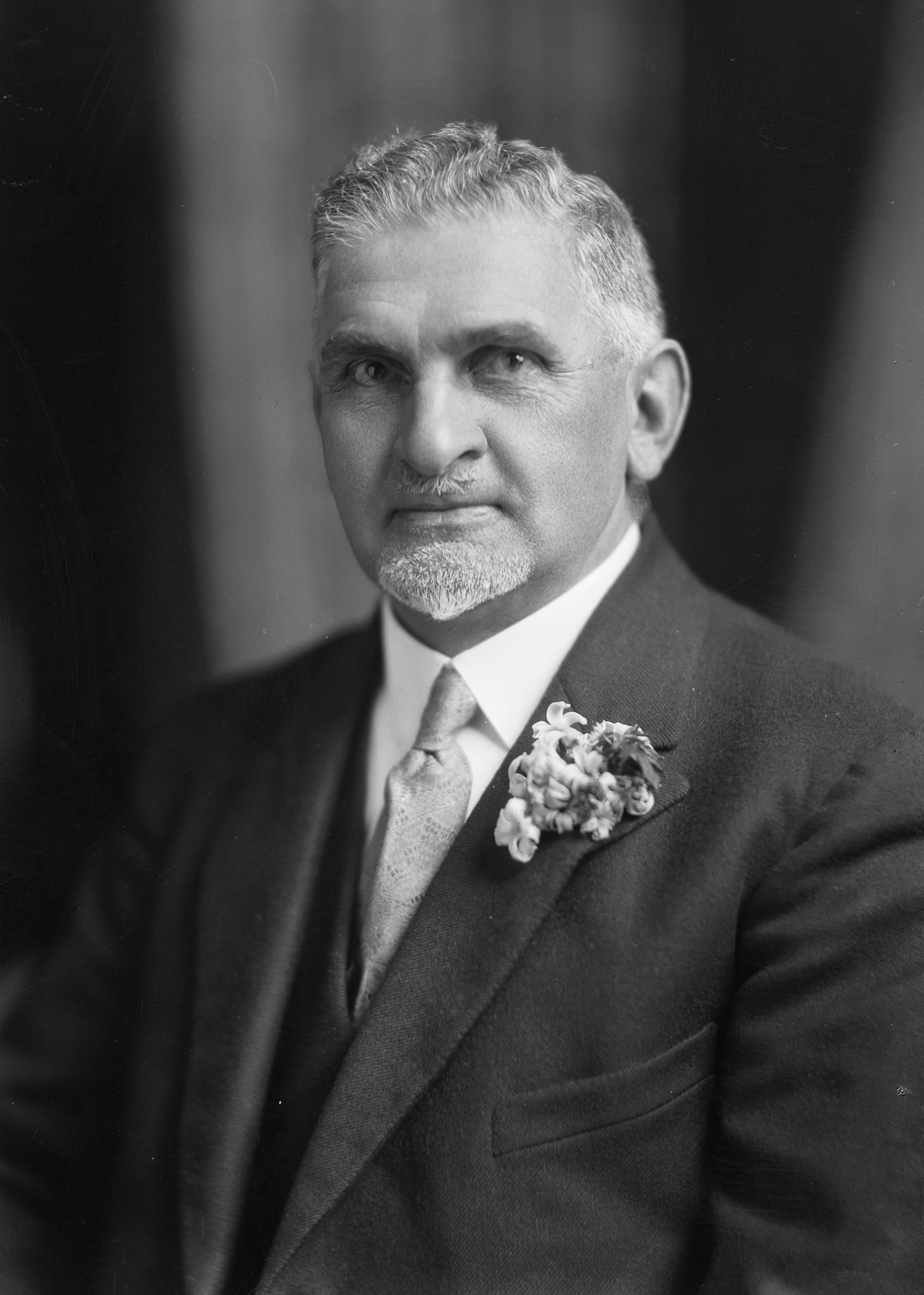

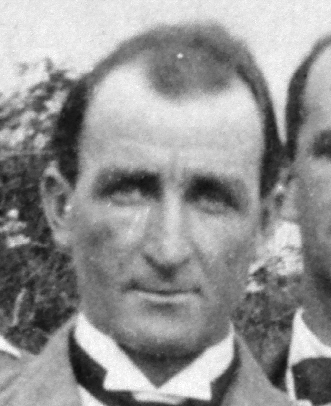

Candidate	Jimmy Nash	Alexander Galbraith	Ernest Hugh Crabb
Party	Reform	Labour	Liberal
Popular vote	2,229	1,914	1,119
Percentage	41.56	35.68	20.86
Member before election
David Buick
Reform
Elected Member
Jimmy Nash
Reform

The Palmerston by-election of 1918 was a by-election held in the Palmerston electorate during the 19th New Zealand Parliament, on 19 December 1918. The by-election was won by the sitting Mayor of Palmerston North, Jimmy Nash with a majority of 315.

== Background ==
The contest was triggered by the death of incumbent MP David Buick of the Reform Party on 18 November 1918 during the influenza epidemic. Under the terms of the coalition agreement between Reform and the Liberal's a condition was made not to oppose each other in by-elections for deceased or retiring MP's from their own parties. However, both contested the seat after failing to agree on a joint National Government nominee.

== Results ==
The following table gives the election results:

1918 Palmerston by-election
Party	Candidate	Votes	%	±%
Reform	Jimmy Nash	2,229	41.56	
Labour	Alexander Galbraith	1,914	35.68	
Liberal	Ernest Hugh Crabb	1,119	20.86	
Independent Reform	A. Buchanan	101	1.88	
Majority		315	5.87	
Turnout		5,363		
