= Alexander Galbraith =

New Zealand labourer (1883–1959)

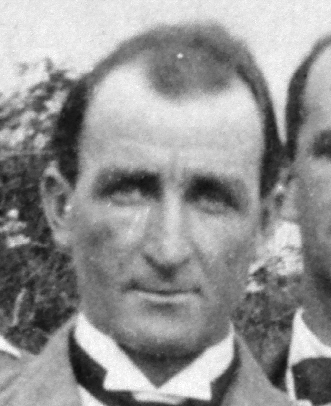
Galbraith in 1922.

Alexander Galbraith (15 February 1883 – 7 October 1959) was a New Zealand labourer, railway worker, trade unionist, communist and timber worker. He was born on 15 February 1883.

In December 1918 Galbraith entered politics. He stood as the Labour Party candidate in the Palmerston by-election polling 1,914 votes, only 315 short of the successful candidate Jimmy Nash, the incumbent Mayor of Palmerston North.

He was to contest Wellington Central as a Communist candidate in the cancelled 1941 general election.
