= Iain Lees-Galloway =

Former New Zealand politician

The Honourable Iain Lees-Galloway
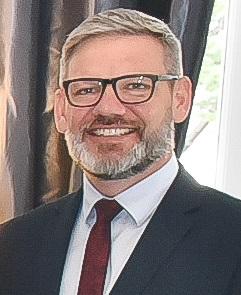
- Lees-Galloway in 2020

2nd Minister for Workplace Relations and Safety
- In office 26 October 2017 – 22 July 2020
- Prime Minister: Jacinda Ardern
- Preceded by: Michael Woodhouse
- Succeeded by: Andrew Little

56th Minister of Immigration
- In office 26 October 2017 – 22 July 2020
- Prime Minister: Jacinda Ardern
- Preceded by: Michael Woodhouse
- Succeeded by: Kris Faafoi

13th Minister for ACC
- In office 26 October 2017 – 22 July 2020
- Prime Minister: Jacinda Ardern
- Preceded by: Michael Woodhouse
- Succeeded by: Carmel Sepuloni

Deputy Leader of the House
- In office 26 October 2017 – 22 July 2020
- Prime Minister: Jacinda Ardern
- Preceded by: Michael Woodhouse
- Succeeded by: Michael Wood

Member of the New Zealand Parliament for Palmerston North
- In office 8 November 2008 – 17 October 2020
- Preceded by: Steve Maharey
- Succeeded by: Tangi Utikere
- Majority: 6,392 (2017)

Personal details
- Born: 18 September 1978 (age 48) Auckland, New Zealand
- Party: The Opportunities Party (2024–present)
- Other political affiliations: Labour (2008–2024)
- Education: Massey University

Iain Francis Lees-Galloway (born 18 September 1978), initially Iain Galloway, is a New Zealand former politician.

A former union organiser, Lees-Galloway was a Labour Party Member of Parliament from 2008 to 2020, representing the Palmerston North electorate. From 2017 until his dismissal in 2020 he was the Minister for Workplace Relations and Safety, Minister of Immigration, and Minister for ACC in the Sixth Labour Government.

After leaving his parliamentary career Lees-Galloway joined The Opportunities Party and by 2025 had become the party's general manager.

== Early life ==
Lees-Galloway was born on 18 September 1978 in Auckland, where he attended King's College. He moved to Palmerston North to study at Massey University where he was president of the Massey University Students' Association in 2005. He graduated with a Bachelor of Arts degree from Massey in 2016.

== Professional experience ==
Before entering Parliament Lees-Galloway worked for the New Zealand Nurses Organisation as an organiser and subsequently publicity coordinator.

== Member of Parliament ==
New Zealand Parliament
Years	Term	Electorate	List	Party
2008–2011	49th	Palmerston North	48	Labour
2011–2014	50th	Palmerston North	37	Labour
2014–2017	51st	Palmerston North	24	Labour
2017–2020	52nd	Palmerston North	14	Labour

=== Fifth National Government, 2008–2017 ===
Lees-Galloway joined the Labour Party in 2005 and became chairman of the Palmerston North branch in the following year. He was selected as successor to retiring MP Steve Maharey, who became Vice Chancellor of Massey University, in a contested Labour Party selection for the 2008 election. He defeated the National Party candidate, Malcolm Plimmer, with a majority of 1,117 votes.

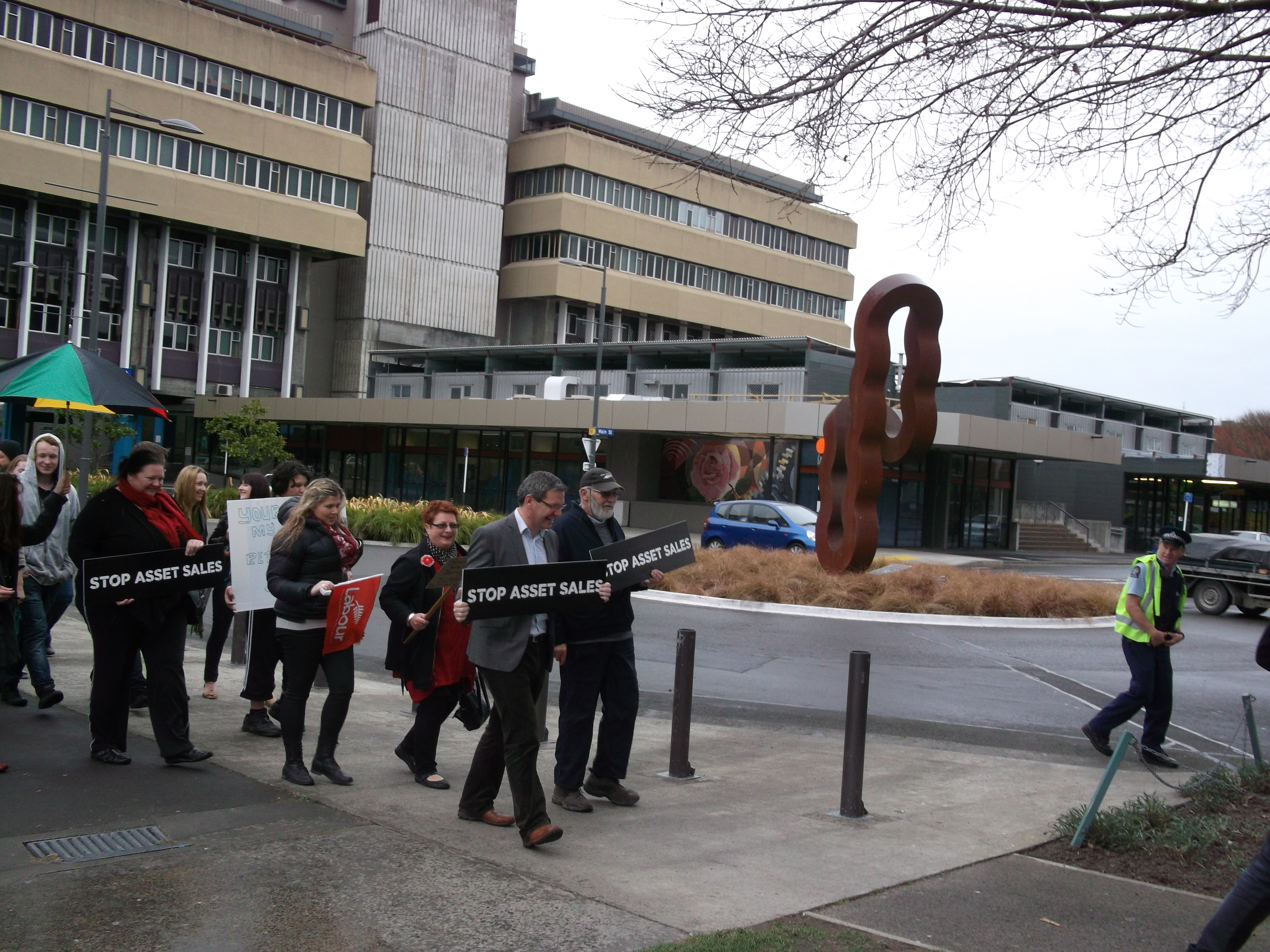
Lees-Galloway leading a protest march against privatisation in July 2012

Lees-Galloway was confirmed in the 2011 election with a majority increased from 1,117 in 2008 to 3,285 in the latest election. In the 2014 election, Lees-Galloway was challenged by the Mayor of Palmerston North, Jono Naylor, but remained successful. Lees-Galloway had a majority of 2,212 votes over Naylor.

During his tenure, Lees-Galloway has served as the Labour Party's spokesperson for Veteran's Affairs, Transport and, Land Information and has served associate spokesperson for Health. Prior to that, he was associate spokesperson on health (drugs and alcohol) and defence. He served as junior whip for the Labour Party from 2013 to 2014.

He has had three bills drawn from the member's ballot. In September 2010, his Smoke-free Environments (Removing Tobacco Displays) Amendment Bill was drawn from the member's ballot, attempting to ban the display of tobacco products and smoking accessories at points of sale. The bill's objective was subsequently adopted in a Government bill which came into force 23 July 2012. Lees-Galloway's Electoral (Adjustment of Thresholds) Amendment Bill was also drawn from the member's ballot in February 2013. It proposed amendments to the Electoral Act 1993, implementing the recommendations of the Electoral Commission with respect to the party vote threshold. In October 2013, his Land Transport (Safer Alcohol Limits for Driving) Amendment Bill, was drawn and progressed to First Reading. This bill would have lowered the allowable blood alcohol content (BAC) from 0.08g to 0.05g per 100mls of blood when driving. The Government announced their own legislation that would do the same after Lees-Galloway's bill was drawn. The legislation was passed July 2014.

As his party's spokesperson for Workplace Relations, Lees-Galloway was a leading voice alongside trade unions in the campaign to eliminate zero-hour contracts in New Zealand. In 2016, after a year and a half long campaign that involved tens of thousands of New Zealanders, industrial action by union members, parliamentary negotiations, agreements were made with the National government. Lees-Galloway submitted an amendment to the Employment Standards Legislation Bill that addressed the issue and was approved overwhelmingly. The bill unanimously passed in parliament on 11 March 2016 and took effect April 2016. The legislation is thought to be one of the first laws in the developed world to end the use of deals criticised as exploitative. Lees-Galloway has declared the reforms "a win for working people" of New Zealand.

=== Sixth Labour Government, 2017–2020 ===
During the 2017 election, Lees-Galloway was re-elected in Palmerston North, defeating the National Party's candidate Adrienne Pierce by 6,392 votes. He was designated as Minister of Immigration by the Labour Party caucus following Labour's formation of a coalition government with New Zealand First and the Greens.

Because Lees-Galloway had both Workplace Relations and Immigration, both areas where Labour and New Zealand First had great differences of opinion, he had a tough job within the coalition. One minister said that he was “at the front line of the differences between Labour and NZ First”, while a Labour source said, "Every single immigration issue was absolute torture". Tracey Martin, a NZ First MP, said that her party's relationship with Lees-Galloway was “incredibly fraught". A source from NZ First described Lees-Galloway as "arrogant", and a Labour cabinet minister said that he "was not very good at hiding the dismay on his face. Even when he was silent, you could see how pissed off he was."

On 20 July 2018, Lees-Galloway in his capacity as Immigration Minister granted visas for the Canadian alt right activists Lauren Southern and Stefan Molyneux to visit New Zealand for a speaking tour in August 2018. Mayor of Auckland Phil Goff had denied them access to Auckland Council facilities on the grounds that they were there to stir ethnic and political tensions. While Lees-Galloway described Southern and Molyneux's views as counter to the "kind and tolerant values" of the vast majority of New Zealanders, he cleared their visas on the grounds that they had fulfilled immigration character requirements including not having been convicted of a crime or previously barred from Australia and the United Kingdom.

In October and November 2018, Lees-Galloway was criticised by the opposition National Party over his decision to grant residency to the convicted Czech drug smuggler Karel Sroubek, who had a lengthy criminal record in both the Czech Republic and New Zealand. The case also attracted considerable media interest in New Zealand and led the Czech government to seek Sroubek's extradition. In December 2018, Lees-Galloway attributed his decision to Immigration New Zealand's failure to provide information on Sroubek's criminal activities in the Czech Republic.

==== Dismissal ====
On 22 July 2020 Lees-Galloway was dismissed from his immigration, workplace relations and ACC ministerial portfolios by Prime Minister Jacinda Ardern after admitting an inappropriate but consensual relationship with a person working in one of his agencies. Prime Minister Ardern dismissed Lees-Galloway after receiving information from Opposition Leader Judith Collins, stating that she had lost confidence in him for "improperly using his position of power." Additionally, there was an official probe into his spending, though this did not find anything inappropriate.

Lees-Galloway issued a statement admitting that he had acted "completely inappropriately" in his position and could not continue as a minister. He also apologised to the Prime Minister and his family "for letting them down". Lees-Galloway kept a generally low profile after the demotion, apart from going to Parliament to give his valedictory speech.

Lees-Galloway did not stand at the 2020 election. Tangi Utikere, the deputy mayor of Palmerston North, replaced Lees-Galloway as the Labour Party candidate for the Palmerston North electorate, and won the electorate.

On 29 September 2020, Lees-Galloway was granted retention of the title "The Honourable" for life, in recognition of his term as a member of the Executive Council.

== Career after Parliament ==
After leaving Parliament, Lees-Galloway took up a temporary role as lead organiser for the New Zealand Nurses Organisation. He also started a business venture called Here’s Good, which would provide information about and promotion for businesses and aid in donating to good causes. He also held positions with the Aotearoa Food Rescue Alliance and completed a Master of Business Administration. On 9 June 2024, he announced on LinkedIn that he had joined the Opportunities Party (TOP) earlier in the year, but did not plan to stand as a candidate. By 2025 he had been appointed the party's general manager. TOP has been leaderless since 2023. In August 2025 Lees-Galloway advertised the role as party leader on employment website Seek.

In February 2026, Lees-Galloway confirmed that the Opportunities Party would field about 30 candidates in the 2026 New Zealand general election with the goal of meeting the 5% threshold needed for minor parties to enter Parliament.

== Personal life ==
Lees-Galloway is married to intermediate teacher Clare; the couple have three children.

New Zealand Parliament
Preceded by Steve Maharey	Member of Parliament for Palmerston North; 2008–2020	Succeeded by Tangi Utikere
Preceded by Michael Woodhouse	Deputy Leader of the House; 2017–2020	Succeeded by Michael Wood
Political offices
Preceded by Michael Woodhouse	Minister for Workplace Relations and Safety; 2017–2020	Succeeded by Andrew Little
Preceded by Michael Woodhouse	Minister of Immigration; 2017–2020	Succeeded by Kris Faafoi
Preceded by Michael Woodhouse	Minister for ACC; 2017–2020	Succeeded by Carmel Sepuloni
