= Frederick Pirani =

New Zealand politician

The Honourable Frederick Pirani
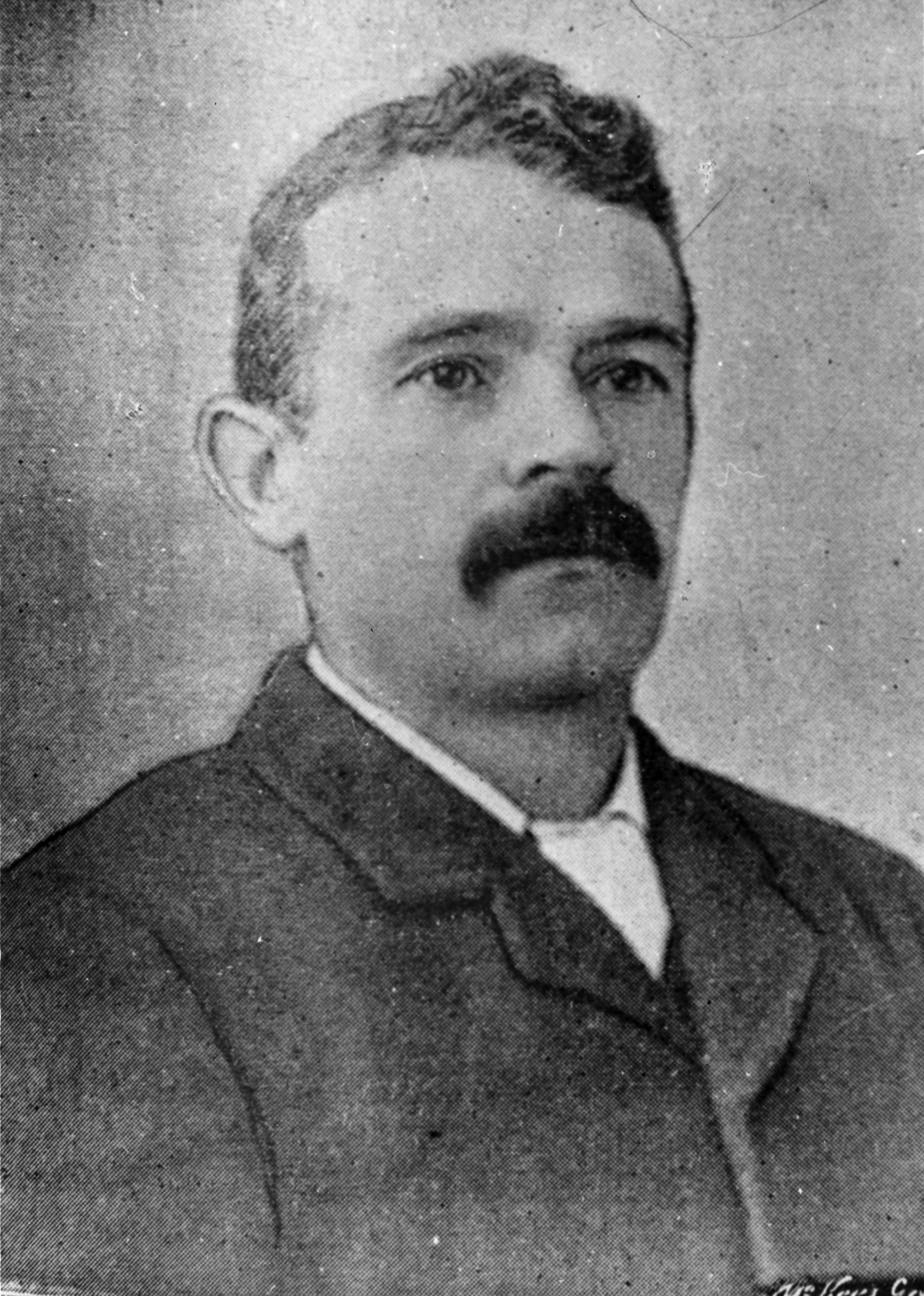
- Frederick Pirani in 1895

Member of the New Zealand Parliament for Palmerston
- In office 1893–1902
- Preceded by: James Wilson
- Succeeded by: William Thomas Wood

Personal details
- Born: 3 December 1858 Melbourne, Australia
- Died: 26 October 1926 (aged 67) Wellington, New Zealand
- Party: Liberal Party (1893–96)

Frederick Pirani (3 December 1858 – 26 October 1926) was a New Zealand politician. He was Member of the House of Representatives for Palmerston from 1893 to 1902, first as a Liberal, then as an independent. He was part of the Liberal Party's "left" (radical) wing.

== Early life ==
Pirani was born in Melbourne, Australia, and his family emigrated to New Zealand in 1864. His father was a journalist, and later owner of the Manawatu Evening Standard. Pirani served his apprenticeship as a printer under John Ballance on the Wanganui Herald in the late 1870s, and later became a journalist.

== Political career ==
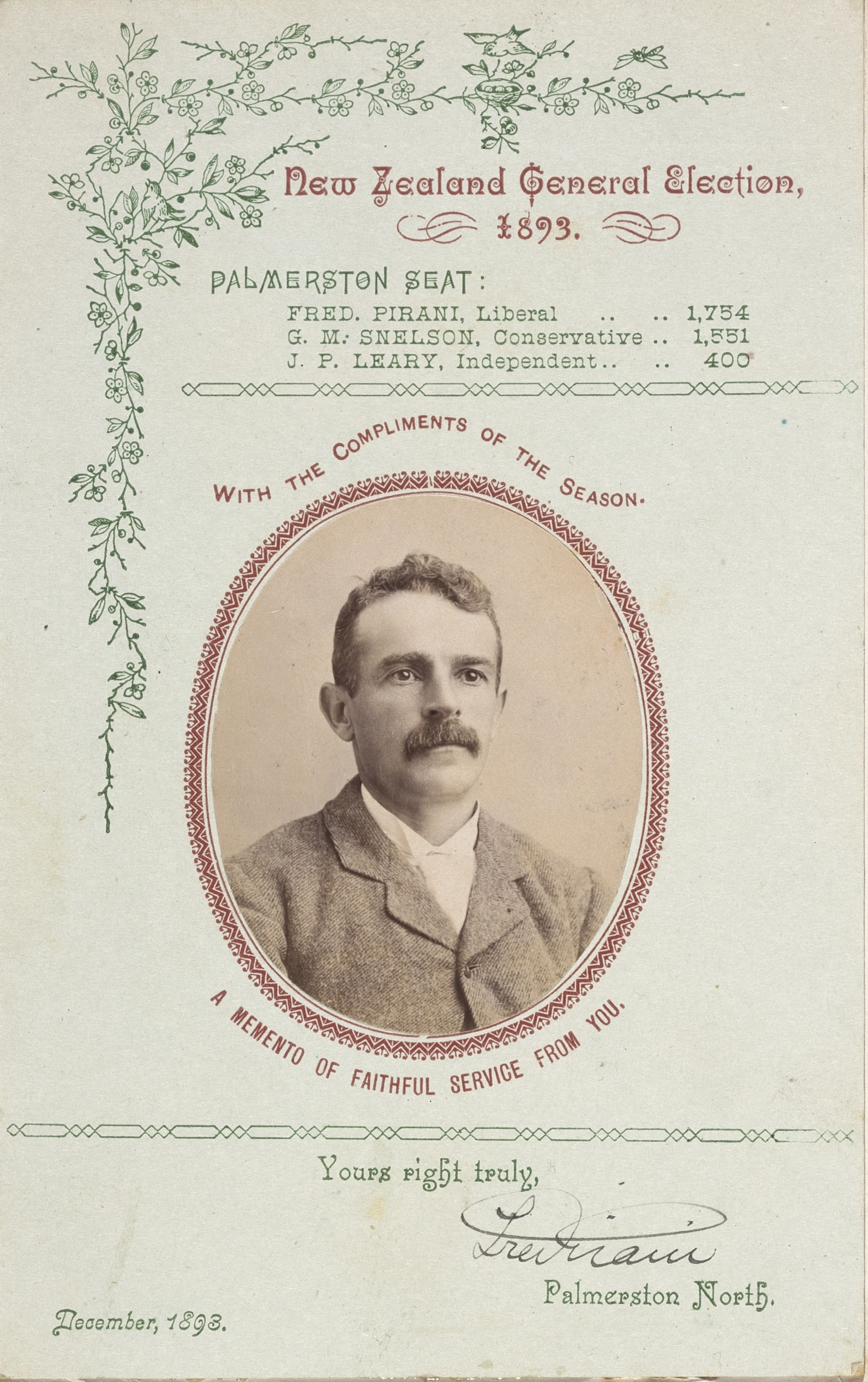
Pirani greeting card, 1893

In 1884 he moved to Palmerston North, where he became involved in politics. He was elected as councillor of Palmerston North Borough in 1888–1889, and again in 1901.

New Zealand Parliament
Years	Term	Electorate	Party
1893–1896	12th	Palmerston	Liberal
1896–1899	13th	Palmerston	Independent Liberal
1899–1902	14th	Palmerston	Independent Liberal

He established a local chapter of the Knights of Labour, and in 1890 stood for Parliament as a Labour candidate, losing by only 61 votes. He was persuaded to stand again by John Ballance, and was elected as a Liberal in 1893. He would hold the seat until 1902, but the change in the Liberal platform under Richard Seddon led him to gradually break with the party.

In 1896 he was associated with the Radical Party, and stood as an "independent liberal". In 1898 he voted against the government on a confidence motion, effectively becoming part of the opposition. He was re-elected as an independent in 1899. During the 1899 campaign, he was endorsed by William Russell, the Leader of the Opposition, as their favoured candidate despite the presence of an already declared opposition candidate David Buick. Buick and his supporters rejected Russell's decision, and ran their campaign regardless. He contested the 1902 election in the Hutt electorate, but was defeated by Thomas Wilford. While he stood again as an independent in Palmerston in 1905, Wanganui in 1914, and Wellington Central in 1919, he came second each time and never regained elected office.

Pirani died in Wellington on 26 October 1926.

New Zealand Parliament
Preceded by James Wilson	Member of Parliament for Palmerston; 1893–1902	Succeeded by William Thomas Wood
