= William Thomas Wood =

New Zealand politician (1854–1943)

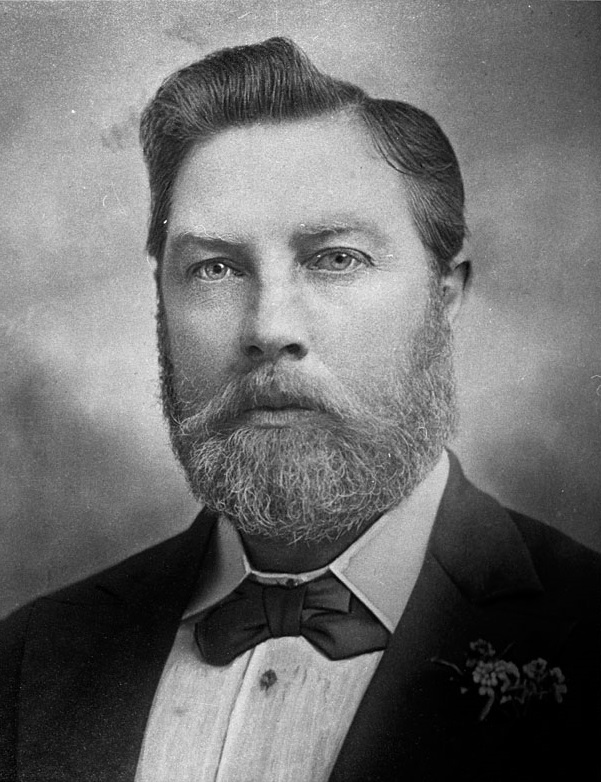

Member of the New Zealand Parliament for Palmerston
- In office 1902–1908
- Preceded by: Frederick Pirani
- Succeeded by: David Buick

9th Mayor of Palmerston North
- In office 1895–1899
- Preceded by: William Park
- Succeeded by: Henry Haydon
- In office 1901–1903
- Preceded by: George Matthew Snelson
- Succeeded by: Charles Dunk

Personal details
- Born: 10 June 1854 Hobart, Van Diemen's Land
- Died: 10 June 1943 (aged 89) Sydney, New South Wales, Australia
- Party: Liberal Party
- Spouse: Ellen Jolly (m. 1879)
- Profession: Blacksmith

William Thomas Wood (10 June 1854 – 10 June 1943) was a Liberal Party Member of Parliament in New Zealand.

== Early life and family ==
Born in Hobart, Van Diemen's Land, in June 1854, Wood was the son of Robert Wood and Charlotte Wood (née Watford). After leaving school he worked as a blacksmith for seven years, before moving to New Zealand in 1872. He lived first in Dunedin, working as a manager on the construction of the Port Chalmers–South railway. In 1875 he settled at Kumara on the West Coast, where he established a blacksmith's business. He married Ellen Jolly of Kumara in 1879, and the couple went on to have seven children. In March 1879, Wood moved to Palmerston North, setting up as a blacksmith there, and continuing in that business until it was taken over by his eldest son in 1900.

== Political career ==
=== Local politics ===
Wood was active in local body politics. He was elected councillor on the Palmerston North Borough in 1884, 1885–1887, 1892–1895 and again in 1901. He was Mayor of Palmerston North from 1895 to 1899, and again from 1901 to 1903.

From 1902 to 1904 Wood was a member of the Wellington Harbour Board representing Manawatu.

=== Member of Parliament ===
New Zealand Parliament
Years	Term	Electorate	Party
1902–1905	15th	Palmerston	Liberal
1905–1908	16th	Palmerston	Liberal

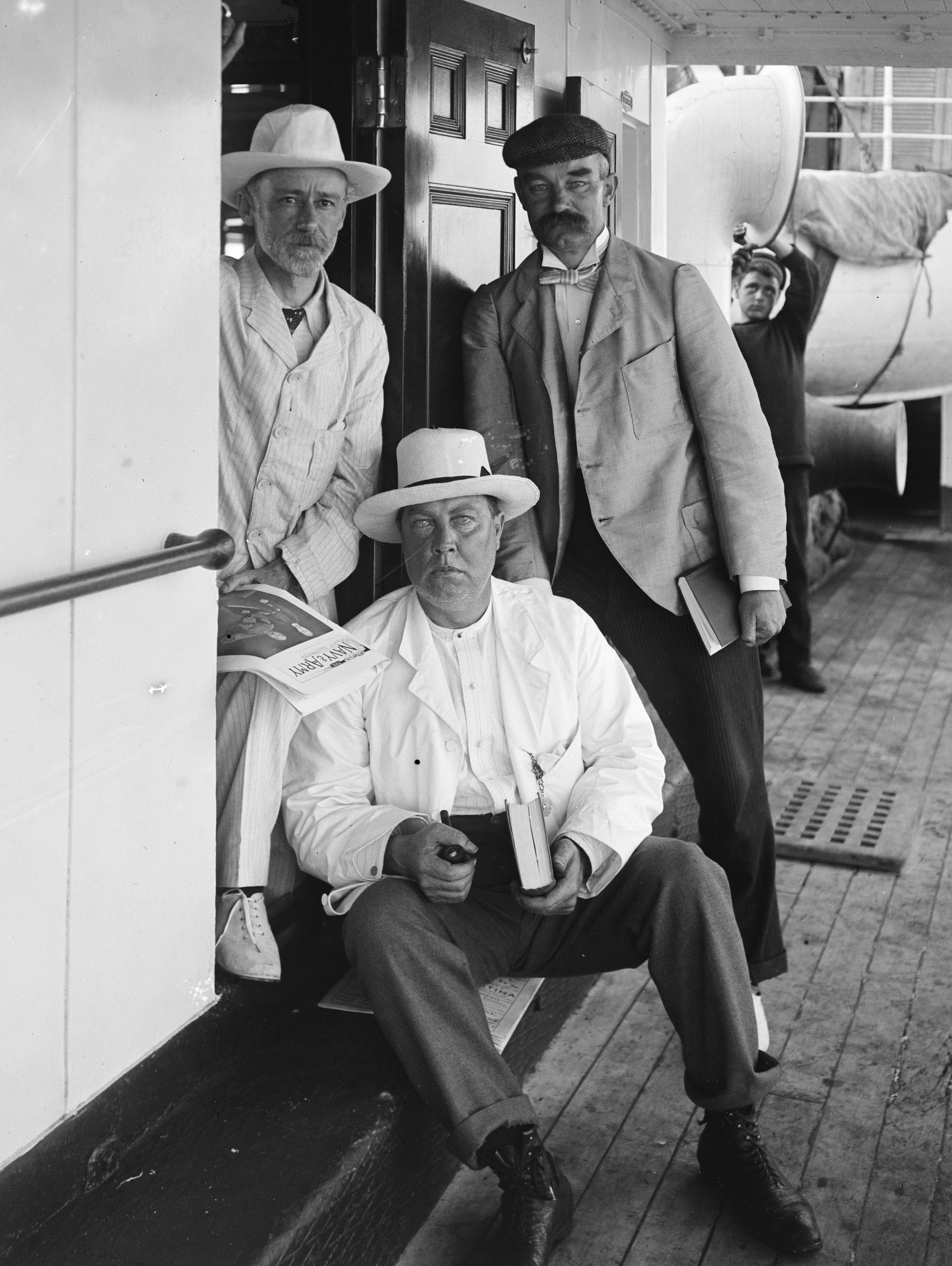
Walter Carncross, Wood (centre) and James Allen during the Parliamentary Excursion to South Sea Islands, 1903

Wood was endorsed by Prime Minister Richard Seddon as the government candidate for the Palmerston (now Palmerston North) electorate in the 1899 general election, a measure by which Seddon demonstrated his opposition to Frederick Pirani. Pirani won the Palmerston electorate that year, but unsuccessfully contested the 1902 election in the Hutt electorate.

Wood won the Palmerston electorate in the 1902 general election, was re-elected in 1905, but in 1908 he was defeated by the Reform candidate David Buick.

He later retired to Australia and died in the Sydney suburb of Bondi on 10 June 1943, his 89th birthday. The funeral service was held at St Matthew's Anglican Church, and he was cremated at Northern Suburbs Crematorium.

== Notes ==
New Zealand Parliament
Preceded by Frederick Pirani	Member of Parliament for Palmerston; 1902–1908	Succeeded by David Buick
