= David Buick (politician) =

New Zealand politician

David Buick JP
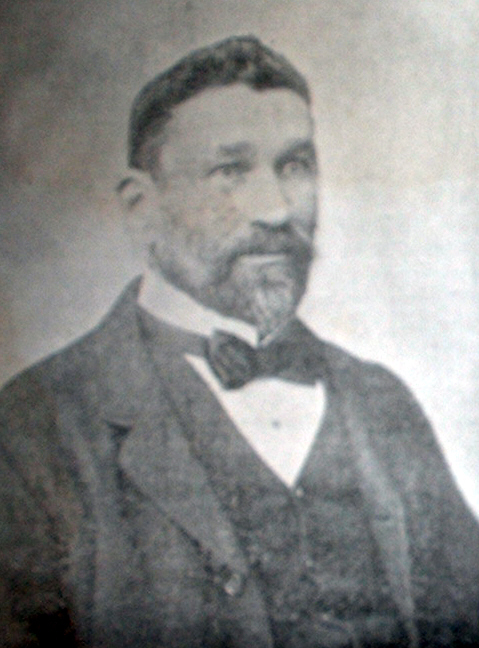
- David Buick in the 1890s

Member of the New Zealand Parliament for Palmerston
- In office 1908–1918
- Preceded by: William Wood
- Succeeded by: Jimmy Nash

Personal details
- Born: 29 April 1848 Wellington
- Died: 18 November 1918 (aged 70)
- Party: Reform Party
- Profession: Farmer, politician

David Buick (29 April 1848 – 18 November 1918) was a New Zealand politician of the Reform Party. A New Zealand-born sheep breeder, he represented farming interests in Parliament. He owned racing horses and won various high-profile races. He died in office in the 1918 influenza epidemic.

== Early life ==
Buick was born in Wellington in 1848. His father, William Buick, had come to Wellington in 1841 on the Arab from England. Buick senior farmed in the Hutt Valley, with Buick junior taking over the farm in 1867. On 5 June 1876, he married Mary Ann (Polly) Buick (née Hill), daughter of I. M. Hill from Nelson.

In 1881, Buick junior bought land in the Manawatū's Kairanga Block. Living at a time when many New Zealanders were immigrants, Buick was proud of his birth in the colony and referred to it on occasions.

== Political career ==
In 1885, he started making submissions to the Road Board over access issues. In 1887, he joined the Road Board and within months, he became its chairman. The Road Board ran into financial difficulties over a court case concerning stormwater run off, and ratepayers thus petitioned for the establishment of the Manawatu Land Drainage Board (MLDB), which was established in 1894. In December 1895, Buick became the MLDB's second chairman and held that position until 1898.

New Zealand Parliament
Years	Term	Electorate	Party
1908–1909	17th	Palmerston	Independent
1909–1911	Changed allegiance to:		Reform
1911–1914	18th	Palmerston	Reform
1914–1918	19th	Palmerston	Reform

He first stood for Parliament in the 1896 election against the incumbent Frederick Pirani in the Palmerston electorate (since 1938 called the Palmerston North electorate) and came within 50 votes of unseating him (1553 versus 1603 votes for Buick and Pirani, respectively). Pirani, who represented the Liberal Government, fell out with Premier Richard Seddon. In the 1899 election, Pirani contested the Palmerston electorate as an independent, whilst the Liberal Party put William Wood, who had been Mayor of Palmerston North since 1895, forward as their candidate. Buick, who contested the election as a conservative candidate, came a distant third.

The next election contested by Buick was the 1908 general election. William Wood had won the 1902 and 1905 elections, and Buick representing the opposition stood against the incumbent Liberal. The 1908 general election was held under the Second Ballot Act, contested by three candidates. Buick, Wood and William Milverton received 2675, 2626 and 123 votes, respectively. As Buick did not receive an absolute majority, a second ballot was required. Buick won the second ballot with a majority of 93 votes (2811 versus 2718 votes for Buick and Wood, respectively).

In 1909, the opposition started calling itself the Reform Party, and Buick contested the 1911 election under that banner. The Liberal Party put Robert McNab forward. Milverton contested the electorate again, and William Thomson was the fourth candidate. Buick won just over half the votes (3374 of 6732 votes cast, with 3367 votes required to achieve an absolute majority) and a second ballot was thus not required.

The 1914 election was again contested by four candidates. Buick stood again for the Reform Party. Jim Thorn represented the Social Democratic Party. Hugh Crabb was the official candidate for the Liberal Party and the Mayor of Palmerston North, Jimmy Nash, was also a member of the Reform Party. Buick, Thorn, Crabb and Nash received 2739, 1686, 1476 and 1077 votes, respectively. He represented the electorate until his death.

His political interests centred on farming issues. Buick had a conservative outlook, but rejected that label. During the war, he was a stern critic of conscientious objectors.

== Life outside politics and death ==
Buick was a successful breeder of Romney Marsh sheep. Buick bred race horses and they won several high-profile races, which certainly helped his political career. He played a fundamental role in establishing the freezing works in Longburn. For some time, he was the president of the Manawatu Caledonian Society.

Buick's wife died on 1 August 1917. Buick had a serious case of influenza in April 1918. He died in Wellington on 18 November 1918 during the height of the influenza epidemic of 1918. A fellow MP, Alfred Hindmarsh, had died of influenza only five days before him. After Buick's death, the Prime Minister, William Massey, adjourned the House of Representatives as 18 other members were also ill. Buick was buried in Palmerston North at the Terrace End Cemetery, survived by his six children. His parents, William Buick (d. 1880) and Agnes Buick (d. 1897), are buried in the same family plot as David Buick and his wife.

New Zealand Parliament
Preceded by William Wood	Member of Parliament for Palmerston; 1908–1918	Succeeded by Jimmy Nash
