= Minister of Education (New Zealand) =

New Zealand minister of the Crown

- Coat of arms of New Zealand

- Flag of New Zealand

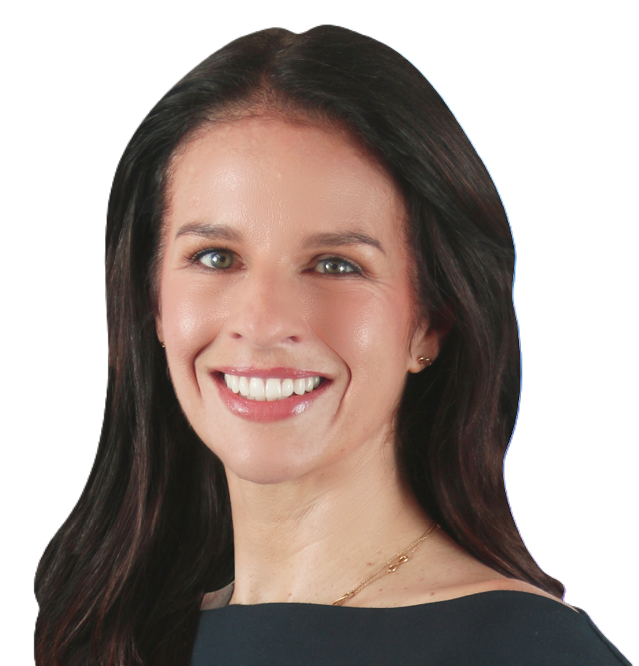
- Incumbent; Erica Stanford since 27 November 2023
- Ministry of Education
- Style: The Honourable
- Member of: Cabinet of New Zealand; Executive Council
- Reports to: Prime Minister of New Zealand
- Appointer: Governor-General of New Zealand
- Term length: At His Majesty's pleasure
- Formation: 12 January 1878
- First holder: John Ballance
- Salary: $288,900
- Website: www.beehive.govt.nz

The minister of education is a minister in the New Zealand Government with responsibility for the country's schools, and is in charge of the Ministry of Education.

The present minister is Erica Stanford, a member of the National Party.

== History ==
The first minister was appointed in 1878, shortly after the abolition of the Provinces allowed the central government to assume responsibility for education. It has existed without major interruption since then. The size of the portfolio has meant that, particularly since the Fourth Labour Government, additional associate ministers of education, and at times one or more ministers responsible for tertiary education, have been established.

== List of Education Ministers ==
Key

Independent Liberal Reform United Labour National

No.	Name	Portrait	Term of Office		Prime Minister
1	John Ballance		12 January 1878	1 July 1879	Grey
2	William Rolleston		8 October 1879	15 December 1880	Hall
3	Thomas Dick		15 December 1880	16 August 1884	Hall
3	Thomas Dick		15 December 1880	16 August 1884	Whitaker
3	Thomas Dick		15 December 1880	16 August 1884	Atkinson
4	William Montgomery		16 August 1884	28 August 1884	Stout
5	Robert Stout		8 January 1885	8 October 1887	Stout
6	George Fisher		8 October 1887	8 April 1889	Atkinson
7	Harry Atkinson		8 April 1889	9 July 1889	Atkinson
8	Thomas William Hislop		9 July 1889	24 January 1891	Atkinson
9	William Pember Reeves		24 January 1891	10 January 1896	Ballance
9	William Pember Reeves		24 January 1891	10 January 1896	Seddon
10	William Campbell Walker		11 March 1896	22 June 1903	Seddon
11	Richard Seddon		22 June 1903	10 June 1906	Seddon
12	William Hall-Jones		10 June 1906	6 August 1906	Hall-Jones
13	George Fowlds		6 August 1906	4 September 1911	Ward
14	Josiah Hanan		28 March 1912	10 July 1912	Mackenzie
15	James Allen		10 July 1912	12 August 1915	Massey
(14)	Josiah Hanan		12 August 1915	25 August 1919	Massey
16	Francis Bell		4 September 1919	3 April 1920	Massey
17	James Parr		3 April 1920	24 May 1926	Massey
17	James Parr		3 April 1920	24 May 1926	Bell
17	James Parr		3 April 1920	24 May 1926	Coates
18	Robert Wright		24 May 1926	10 December 1928	Coates
19	Harry Atmore		10 December 1928	22 September 1931	Ward
19	Harry Atmore		10 December 1928	22 September 1931	Forbes
20	Robert Masters		22 September 1931	22 November 1934	Forbes
21	Sydney Smith		22 November 1934	6 December 1935	Forbes
22	Peter Fraser		6 December 1935	30 April 1940	Savage
22	Peter Fraser		6 December 1935	30 April 1940	Fraser
23	Rex Mason		30 April 1940	18 October 1947	Fraser
24	Terry McCombs		18 October 1947	13 December 1949	Fraser
25	Ronald Algie		13 December 1949	12 December 1957	Holland
25	Ronald Algie		13 December 1949	12 December 1957	Holyoake
26	Philip Skoglund		12 December 1957	12 December 1960	Nash
27	Blair Tennent		12 December 1960	20 December 1963	Holyoake
28	Arthur Kinsella		20 December 1963	22 December 1969	Holyoake
29	Brian Talboys		22 December 1969	9 February 1972	Holyoake
30	Lorrie Pickering		9 February 1972	8 December 1972	Marshall
31	Phil Amos		8 December 1972	12 December 1975	Kirk
31	Phil Amos		8 December 1972	12 December 1975	Rowling
32	Les Gandar		12 December 1975	13 December 1978	Muldoon
33	Merv Wellington		13 December 1978	26 July 1984	Muldoon
34	Russell Marshall		26 July 1984	24 August 1987	Lange
35	David Lange		24 August 1987	8 August 1989	Lange
36	Geoffrey Palmer		8 August 1989	14 August 1989	Palmer
37	Phil Goff		14 August 1989	2 November 1990	Palmer
37	Phil Goff		14 August 1989	2 November 1990	Moore
38	Lockwood Smith		2 November 1990	1 March 1996	Bolger
39	Wyatt Creech		1 March 1996	31 January 1999	Bolger
39	Wyatt Creech		1 March 1996	31 January 1999	Shipley
40	Nick Smith		31 January 1999	10 December 1999	Shipley
41	Trevor Mallard		10 December 1999	19 October 2005	Clark
42	Steve Maharey		19 October 2005	31 October 2007	Clark
43	Chris Carter		31 October 2007	19 November 2008	Clark
44	Anne Tolley		19 November 2008	12 December 2011	Key
45	Hekia Parata		12 December 2011	2 May 2017	Key
45	Hekia Parata		12 December 2011	2 May 2017	English
46	Nikki Kaye		2 May 2017	26 October 2017	English
47	Chris Hipkins		26 October 2017	25 January 2023	Ardern
48	Jan Tinetti		1 February 2023	27 November 2023	Hipkins
49	Erica Stanford		27 November 2023	Incumbent	Luxon
