= Terrace End Cemetery =

Cemetery in Palmerston North, New Zealand

Coordinates: 40°20′35″S 175°38′31″E

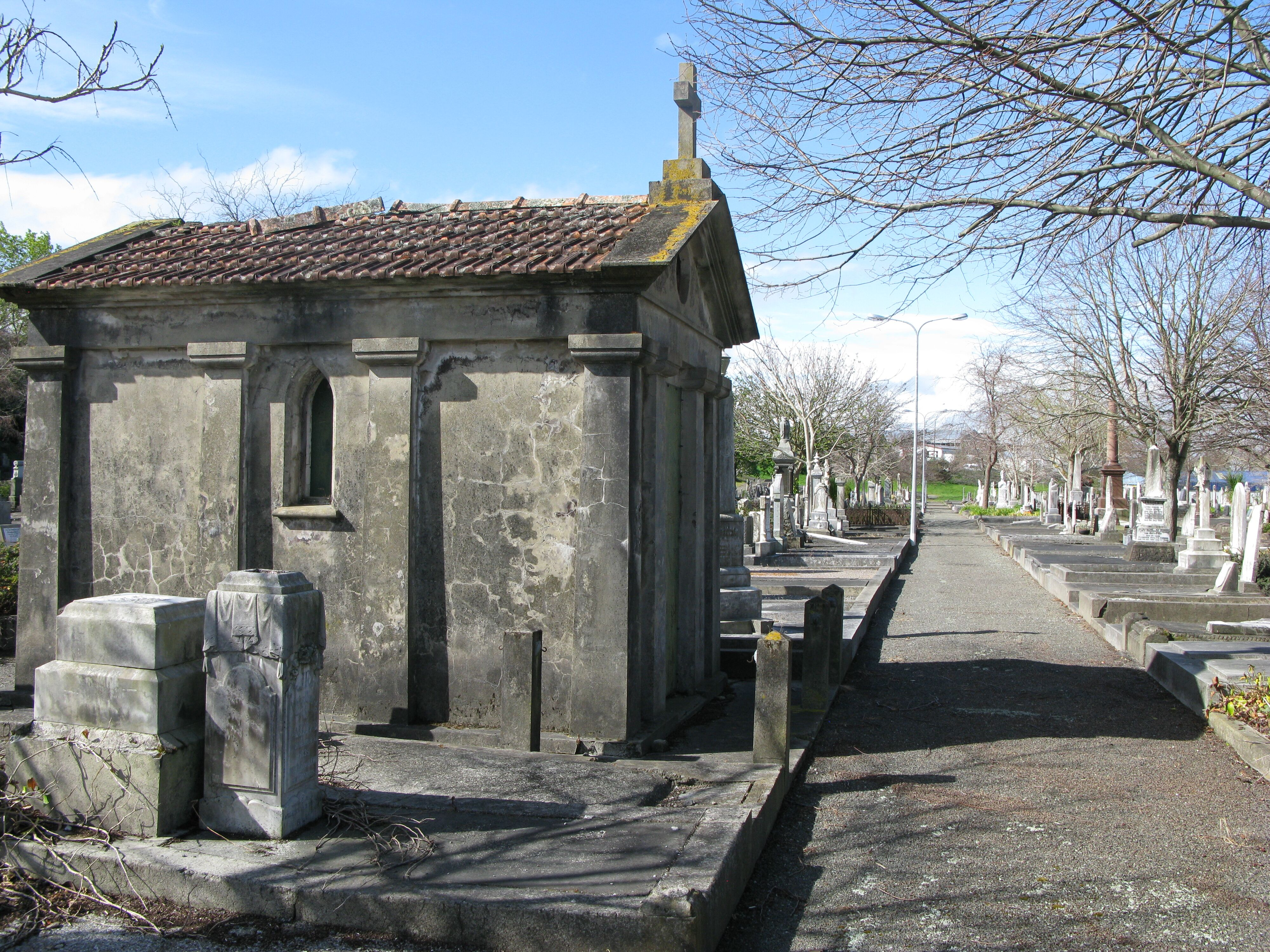
Terrace End Cemetery, Napier Road

Terrace End Cemetery is the oldest cemetery in Palmerston North, New Zealand.

Almost 10,000 people have been buried in the cemetery since Rangitāne gifted the land to the fledgling Palmerston North settlement in 1875.

Plots are now closed, but the descendants of those buried at the cemetery can be buried with their relatives. The cemetery was replaced by Kelvin Grove Cemetery in 1927.

== Burials ==
- George Snelson the first Mayor of Palmerston North and is considered Palmerston North's founding father.
- Edward McKenna a British Army soldier and a recipient of the Victoria Cross.
- Jimmy Nash a Mayor of Palmerston North.
- Joseph Hodgens a politician for the New Zealand Labour Party.
- Rangi Mawhete a land agent, interpreter and politician.
- Sarah McMurray a woodcarver and craftswoman.
