= Steve Maharey =

New Zealand politician

The Honourable Steve Maharey CNZM
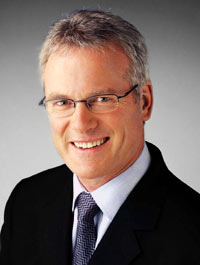
- Maharey in 2008

42nd Minister of Education
- In office 19 October 2005 – 31 October 2007
- Prime Minister: Helen Clark
- Preceded by: Trevor Mallard
- Succeeded by: Chris Carter

22nd Minister for Research, Science and Technology
- In office 21 December 2004 – 31 October 2007
- Prime Minister: Helen Clark
- Preceded by: Pete Hodgson
- Succeeded by: Pete Hodgson

22nd Minister for Social Development
- In office 10 December 1999 – 19 October 2005
- Prime Minister: Helen Clark
- Preceded by: Roger Sowry
- Succeeded by: David Benson-Pope

Member of the New Zealand Parliament for Palmerston North
- In office 27 October 1990 – 8 November 2008
- Preceded by: Trevor de Cleene
- Succeeded by: Iain Lees-Galloway

5th Vice-Chancellor of Massey University
- In office October 2008 – December 2016
- Preceded by: Judith Kinnear
- Succeeded by: Jan Thomas

Personal details
- Born: 3 February 1953 (age 73) Palmerston North, New Zealand
- Party: Labour
- Profession: Sociologist

Steven Maharey CNZM (born 3 February 1953) is a New Zealand academic and former politician of the Labour Party. Elected to Parliament for the first time in 1990, he was Minister of Social Development and Employment from 1999 to 2005 and Minister of Education from 2005 to 2007. He retired from Parliament at the 2008 general election to become the vice-chancellor at Massey University. He considered himself to be a advocater of the Third Way.

== Early life ==
Maharey was born in Palmerston North in 1953, the son of William Maharey and his wife Irene. He attended Freyberg High School in 1966–1969. After gaining an MA Hons in sociology from Palmerston North's Massey University (1972–1976), he was a lecturer at that institution from 1978, teaching both sociology and business administration. His particular specialties within sociology were social change and cultural studies.

== Political career ==
=== Palmerston North City Council ===
Maharey served one term on the Palmerston North City Council from 1986 to 1989.

=== In opposition, 1990–1999 ===
New Zealand Parliament
Years	Term	Electorate	List	Party
1990–1993	43rd	Palmerston North		Labour
1993–1996	44th	Palmerston North		Labour
1996–1999	45th	Palmerston North	none	Labour
1999–2002	46th	Palmerston North	3	Labour
2002–2005	47th	Palmerston North	4	Labour
2005–2008	48th	Palmerston North	5	Labour

In the 1990 election, Maharey stood as the Labour Party candidate for Palmerston North, replacing retiring MP Trevor de Cleene, and was elected to Parliament. After Maharey left the Labour party, Iain Lees-Galloway successfully held the seat for Labour in the 2008 election. He was a subscriber of Third Way political thinking.

Maharey immediately became Labour's spokesperson for broadcasting and communications under Mike Moore. He later gained associate responsibility for education. In 1993, he instead became spokesperson for labour and employment. In 1994 he was promoted to a seat on the frontbench to replace Peter Dunne, who had quit the party. In a 1997 reshuffle he relinquished the labour portfolio and instead became spokesperson on social welfare.

=== In Government, 1999–2008 ===
After the 1999 election, a Labour-Alliance government was formed, Maharey became Minister of Social Services and Employment, having responsibility for social welfare, youth services, and the reduction of unemployment. In 2002 the title changed to Minister for Social Development and Employment. He also became Associate Minister of Education responsible for tertiary education. After the 2002 election, in which Labour was re-elected, Maharey also became Minister of Broadcasting. In a December 2004 cabinet reshuffle, Maharey was promoted to Minister of Education, Minister for Research, Science and Technology, Minister for Crown Research Institutes, and Minister for Youth Affairs. He was officially ranked fourth in the Cabinet hierarchy.

While former colleague John Tamihere described Maharey as 'smarmy' in an Investigate magazine interview, Maharey's personality publicly surfaced during the Christine Rankin Employment Court Hearing in 2001, where Rankin (a former head of Maharey's department whose contract was not renewed) and Maharey publicly exchanged insults. The New Zealand Herald quoted several exchanges between the two verbatim that were alleged to have occurred by Rankin. The court did not uphold Rankin's claims.

In April 2007, Maharey came under criticism for saying 'fuck you' in parliamentary question time on 4 April. He apologised shortly afterwards. The outburst was elicited when Maharey was questioned by Jonathan Coleman about the appropriateness of his actions as broadcasting minister threatening to complain to the Radio New Zealand board when he was displeased by a host Sean Plunket referring to a comment Maharey had made about the need for the Cambridge exam in Botswana as 'racist.'

Maharey stood down from his ministerial roles in October 2007, pending his appointment as vice-chancellor of Massey University. In the 2009 New Year Honours, Maharey was appointed a Companion of the New Zealand Order of Merit for services as a Member of Parliament.

== Roles after Parliament ==
=== Massey University ===
From 2008 until 2016, Steve Maharey was the vice-chancellor of Massey University. During Maharey's eight years as vice-chancellor, total staff numbers (FTE) increased from 3,080 in 2009, his first full year as vice-chancellor, to 3,213 in 2016, his last year in the role. However, over the same time period academic staff numbers remained much the same. Student numbers (EFTS) decreased from 19,994 in 2009 to 18,994 in 2016 due to a reduction in domestic students, including extramural students, partly offset by an increase in international students. Māori enrolments also decreased from 3,548 to 3338 students during this period. Over the same period, the university's consolidated revenues increased from $406 million to $489 million and net assets increased from $924 million to approximately $1 billion. However, external research income decreased from $70 million in 2009 to $67 million in 2016.

In 2022, Maharey was awarded an honorary Doctor of Literature degree by Massey University.

=== Pharmac, ACC and Central Districts Water ===
In August 2018, Maharey became the chair of the Board of Pharmac. During this period Pharmac underwent a period of change following a critical review. In April 2021, he became chair of the Accident Compensation Corporation (ACC).

In March 2023, Maharey attracted media attention after the Public Service Commissioner Peter Hughes ruled that two of his op-ed columns published in the Sunday Star Times breached public servants' rules for impartiality. Since Maharey's actions were deemed to be at the "lower end of the spectrum," Prime Minister Chris Hipkins allowed Maharey to retain his positions as the chair of Pharmac, ACC, and Education New Zealand.

Maharey resigned from Pharmac and ACC on 1 December 2023 after the formation of a National-led coalition government following the 2023 New Zealand general election. He was appointed as Chair of Central Districts Water in March, 2026.

New Zealand Parliament
Preceded by Trevor de Cleene	Member of Parliament for Palmerston North; 1990–2008	Succeeded by Iain Lees-Galloway
Political offices
Preceded by Roger Sowry	Minister of Social Development; 1999–2005	Succeeded by David Benson-Pope
Preceded by Pete Hodgson	Minister for Research, Science and Technology; 2004–2007	Succeeded by Pete Hodgson
Preceded by Trevor Mallard	Minister of Education; 2005–2007	Succeeded by Chris Carter
