= Joe Hodgens =

New Zealand politician

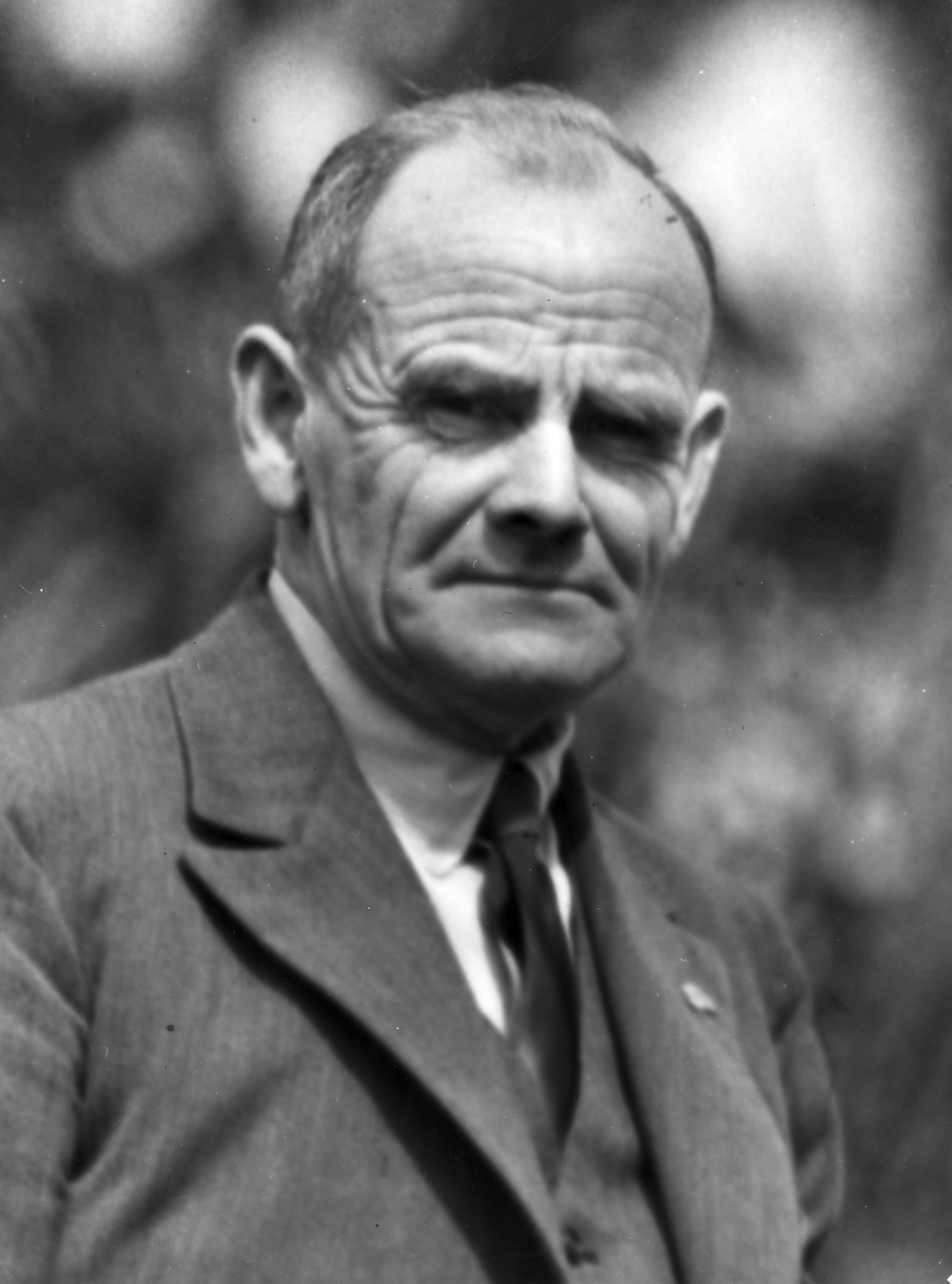
Joseph Hodgens in 1938

Joseph Hodgens (5 January 1887 – 12 January 1955) was a New Zealand politician of the Labour Party.

== Biography ==
New Zealand Parliament
Years	Term	Electorate	Party
1935–1938	25th	Palmerston	Labour
1938–1943	26th	Palmerston North	Labour
1943–1946	27th	Palmerston North	Labour

He represented the Manawatu electorate of Palmerston from 1935, and from 1938 when it was renamed Palmerston North, to 1946 when he retired due to the failing health of his wife. In 1953, Hodgens was awarded the Queen Elizabeth II Coronation Medal.

Born in Waimea South, Nelson, Hodgens was a builder, Secretary of the Carpenters Union, and served on the Palmerston North Borough Council (1919–1921; 1923–1944). He was a cousin of Pat Hickey.

Hodgens died in Palmerston North in 1955 and was buried in Terrace End Cemetery.

New Zealand Parliament
Preceded by Jimmy Nash	Member of Parliament for Palmerston; 1935–1946	Succeeded by Ormond Wilson
