= Blair Tennent =

New Zealand politician (1898–1976)

The Honourable Blair Tennent CBE
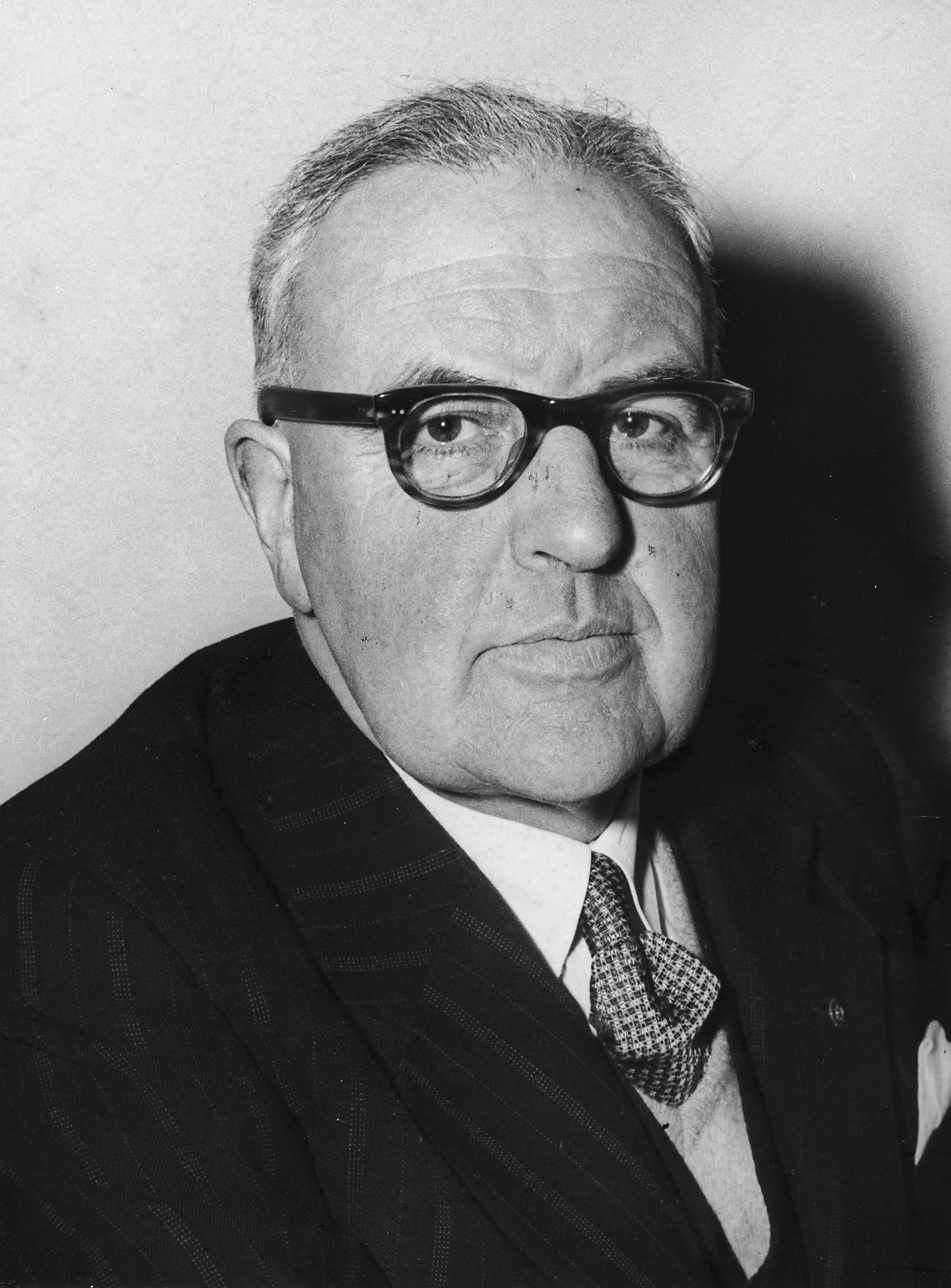
- Blair Tennent in 1954

Member of the New Zealand Parliament for Palmerston North
- In office 1949–1954
- Preceded by: Ormond Wilson
- Succeeded by: Philip Skoglund

Member of the New Zealand Parliament for Manawatu
- In office 1957–1966
- Preceded by: Matthew Oram
- Succeeded by: Les Gandar

27th Minister of Education
- In office 12 December 1960 – 20 December 1963
- Prime Minister: Keith Holyoake
- Preceded by: Philip Skoglund
- Succeeded by: Arthur Kinsella

20th Mayor of Palmerston North
- In office 1956–1959
- Preceded by: Geoffrey Tremaine
- Succeeded by: Gilbert Murray Rennie

Personal details
- Born: 4 December 1898 Greymouth
- Died: 1 May 1976 (aged 77)
- Party: National Party

William Blair Tennent CBE (4 December 1898 – 1 May 1976), known as Blair Tennent, was a New Zealand politician of the National Party and a cabinet minister. In Palmerston North he was a dentist, and a local body politician.

== Early life ==
Tennent was born at Greymouth on 4 December 1898 to Elizabeth Blair and her husband, David Tennent. He was dux at Greymouth District High School, and graduated with a Bachelor of Dental Surgery degree from the University of Otago in 1922.

== Local body politics ==
Tennent was a councillor for Palmerston North City Council from 1933 to 1941. He was Mayor of Palmerston North from 1956 to 1959.

He was on the Board of Governors for Palmerston North Boys' High School, and in 1954 led the conservative opposition to the appointment of Guthrie Wilson to head either Palmerston North Boys' High School or Freyberg High School because of the frank and sexually explicit language in his novels.

== Member of Parliament ==
New Zealand Parliament
Years	Term	Electorate	Party
1949–1951	29th	Palmerston North	National
1951–1954	30th	Palmerston North	National
1957–1960	32nd	Manawatu	National
1960–1963	33rd	Manawatu	National
1963–1966	34th	Manawatu	National

Tennent represented the Palmerston North electorate from 1949 to 1954, when he was defeated by Philip Skoglund. He then represented the Manawatu electorate from 1957 to 1966, when he retired.

He was Minister of Education in the Second National Government from 1960 to 1963.

In 1953, Tennent was awarded the Queen Elizabeth II Coronation Medal.

== Later life ==
He was appointed a Commander of the Order of the British Empire, for services in politics and education, in the 1973 New Year Honours. Tennent died at his home in Palmerston North on 1 May 1976.

New Zealand Parliament
Preceded by Ormond Wilson	Member of Parliament for Palmerston North; 1949–1954	Succeeded by Philip Skoglund
Preceded by Matthew Oram	Member of Parliament for Manawatu; 1957–1966	Succeeded by Les Gandar
Political offices
Preceded by Philip Skoglund	Minister of Education; 1960–1963	Succeeded by Arthur Kinsella
