= Robert Loughnan =

New Zealand farmer, journalist and politician

Robert Andrew Loughnan (1 September 1841 – 14 September 1934) was a New Zealand farmer, journalist and politician. He was born in Patna, India on 1 September 1841. Henry Loughnan was his younger brother. They emigrated with their father and brothers to Australia in 1868. He was a Member of the New Zealand Legislative Council from 6 May 1907 (he was originally summoned on 22 January 1907, but was found to be disqualified) until 5 May 1914, which was the end of his seven-year term. Loughnan wrote a political biography of Joseph Ward.

He died in Wellington on 14 September 1934 and is buried at Karori Cemetery.

== Bibliography ==
- Loughnan, Robert Andrew (1908). New Zealand At Home. London: G. Newnes Ltd.
- Loughnan, Robert Andrew (1929). The Remarkable Life Story of Sir Joseph Ward: 40 Years a Liberal. New Century Press.
