= Henry Loughnan =

New Zealand cricketer

Personal information
- Full name: Henry Hamilton Loughnan
- Born: c. 1849; Patna, British India
- Died: 8 June 1939 (aged 89–90); Avonside, Christchurch, New Zealand
- Relatives: Robert Loughnan (brother)
- Source: ESPNcricinfo, 17 October 2020

Henry Hamilton Loughnan (c. 1849 – 8 June 1939) was a New Zealand lawyer, prominent in Christchurch.

Loughnan was born in about 1849 in Patna, British India, where his father Robert James Loughnan was a judge. Robert Loughnan (1841–1934) was his elder brother. Henry Loughnan received his education at Stonyhurst College. The Loughnan family emigrated to Melbourne in 1868 and some short time afterwards, they settled in New Zealand. Loughan was a cricketer. He played in four first-class matches for Canterbury from 1870 to 1886.

Loughnan was then articled as a lawyer, first under Justice Henry Barnes Gresson and then under Justice Alexander James Johnston. In 1876, he was admitted as a barrister and two years later, he became a partner of William Izard.

In a by-election in May 1896, Loughnan was elected to Christchurch City Council in the Richmond ward. He was a member of the city council for 13 years.

Loughnan died on 8 June 1939 at his home in the Christchurch suburb of Avonside.
