= Jimmy Nash =

New Zealand politician (1871–1952)

James Nash CBE
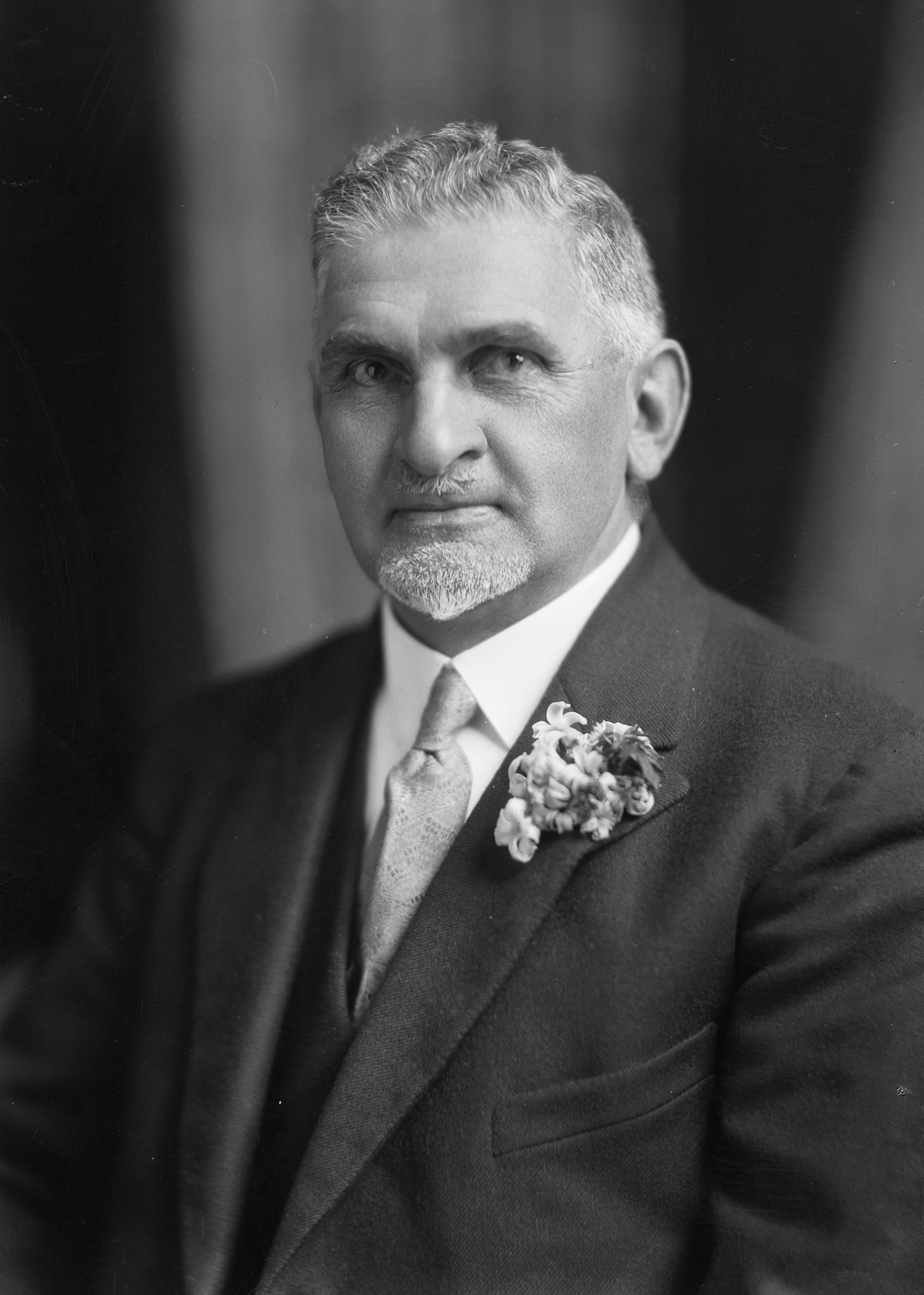
- Nash in 1928

Member of the New Zealand Parliament for Palmerston
- In office 1918 by-election – 1935
- Preceded by: David Buick
- Succeeded by: Joe Hodgens

15th Mayor of Palmerston North
- In office 1908–1923
- Preceded by: Richard Essex
- Succeeded by: Frederick Joseph Nathan

Personal details
- Born: 27 July 1871 Foxton, New Zealand
- Died: 24 July 1952 (aged 80) Palmerston North, New Zealand
- Party: Reform Party (until 1936); National

James Alfred Nash CBE (27 July 1871 – 24 July 1952), known as Jimmy Nash, was a Reform Party Member of Parliament in New Zealand and a Mayor of Palmerston North.

== Biography ==
New Zealand Parliament
Years	Term	Electorate	Party
1918–1919	19th	Palmerston	Reform
1919–1922	20th	Palmerston	Reform
1922–1925	21st	Palmerston	Reform
1925–1928	22nd	Palmerston	Reform
1928–1931	23rd	Palmerston	Reform
1931–1935	24th	Palmerston	Reform

Nash was born in 1871 in Foxton to Ann Ellen Webster and Norman Nash.

He won the Palmerston electorate (since renamed the Palmerston North electorate) in the 1918 Palmerston by-election after the death of David Buick, and held it to 1935, when he was defeated by the Labour candidate, Joe Hodgens in a three-person contest involving the town's mayor, Gus Mansford. He was Chairman of Committees in 1935. He contested the 1938 election in the Palmerston North for the National Party, but was again defeated by Hodgens.

In 1935, Nash was awarded the King George V Silver Jubilee Medal. He was appointed a Commander of the Order of the British Empire for public and municipal services in the 1951 New Year Honours. Nash was a prominent Freemason and was appointed past grand master of Lodge Kilwinning, Manawatu, in 1946.

He died at his home in Palmerston North on 24 July 1952, and was buried in Terrace End Cemetery.

Political offices
Preceded by Sydney George Smith	Chairman of Committees of the House of Representatives; 1935	Succeeded by Ted Howard
New Zealand Parliament
Preceded by David Buick	Member of Parliament for Palmerston; 1918–1935	Succeeded by Joe Hodgens
