= 1953 New Year Honours (New Zealand) =

Annual awards for New Zealanders

The 1953 New Year Honours in New Zealand were appointments by Queen Elizabeth II on the advice of the New Zealand government to various orders and honours to reward and highlight good works by New Zealanders. The awards celebrated the passing of 1952 and the beginning of 1953, and were announced on 1 January 1953.

The recipients of honours are displayed here as they were styled before their new honour.

== Order of Saint Michael and Saint George ==
=== Knight Commander (KCMG) ===
- His Excellency Frederick Widdowson Doidge – high commissioner in London for New Zealand.
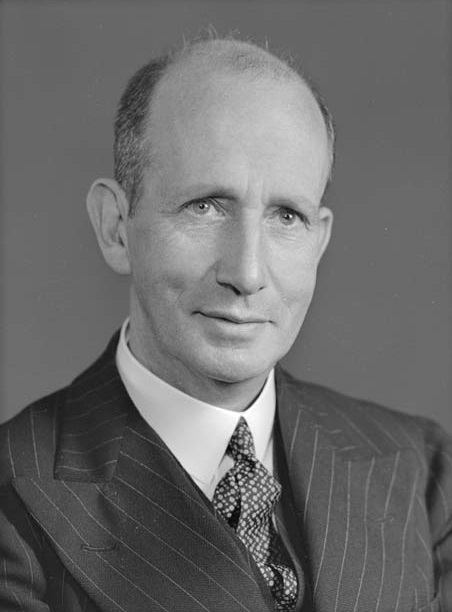
Sir Frederick Doidge

=== Companion (CMG) ===
- Henry Ralph Hervey Chalmers – of Wadestown. For services to banking and sport.
- John Hector Luxford – principal stipendiary magistrate in Auckland.
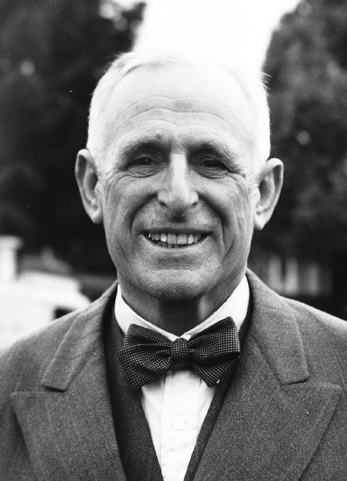
John Luxford

== Order of the British Empire ==
=== Dame Grand Cross (GBE) ===
Civil division

- The Right Honourable Barbara, Baroness Freyberg OBE. In recognition of her services to New Zealand.

=== Commander (CBE) ===
Civil division

- Philip Norton Cryer – director-general of the Post and Telegraph Department.
- Jane Robertson McKenzie – New Zealand chargé d'affaires in Paris.
- Geoffrey Sylvester Peren – principal of the Massey Agricultural College. For services to agriculture.
- William Henry Price – of Wellington. For services to shipping and local government.
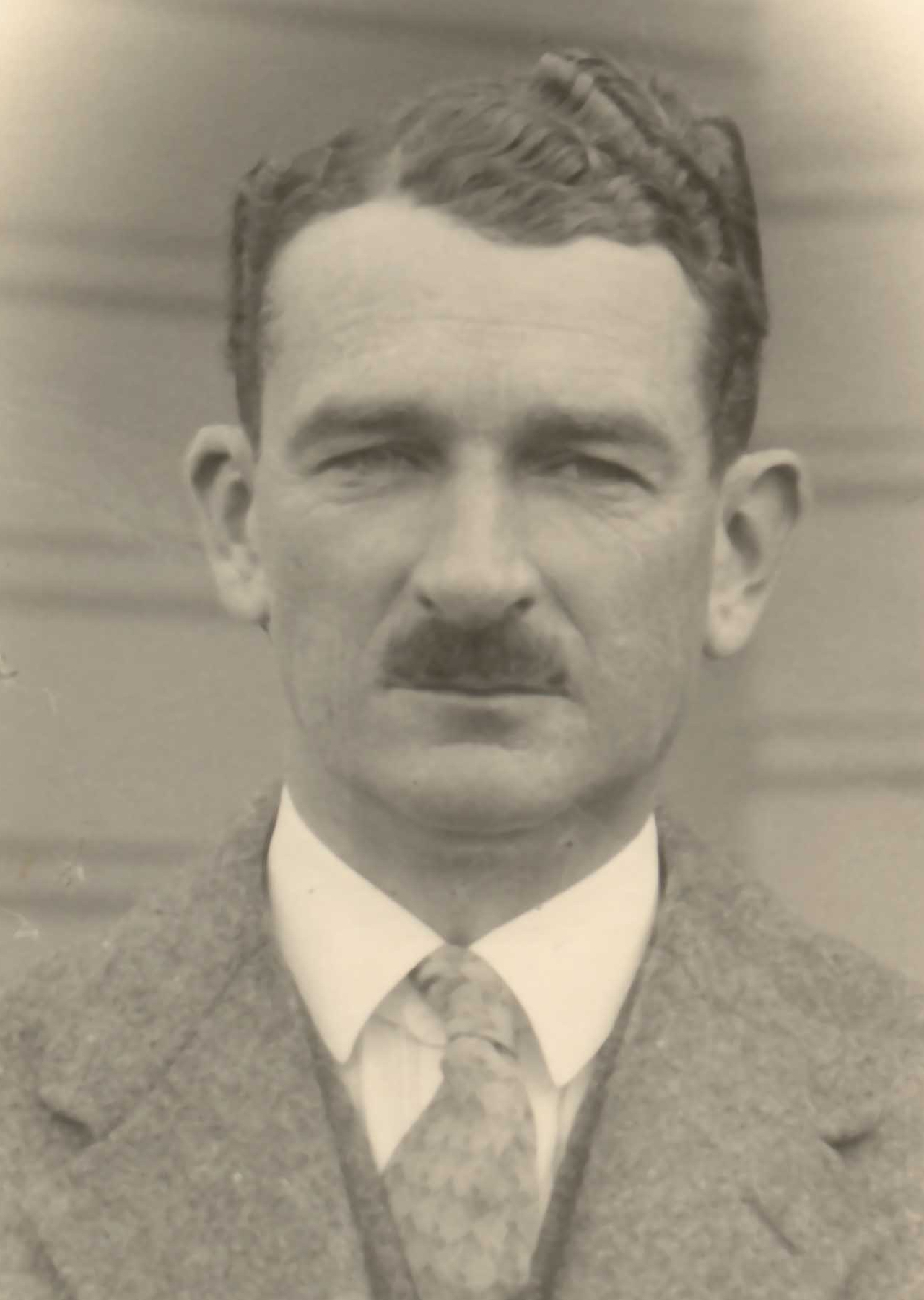
Geoffrey Peren

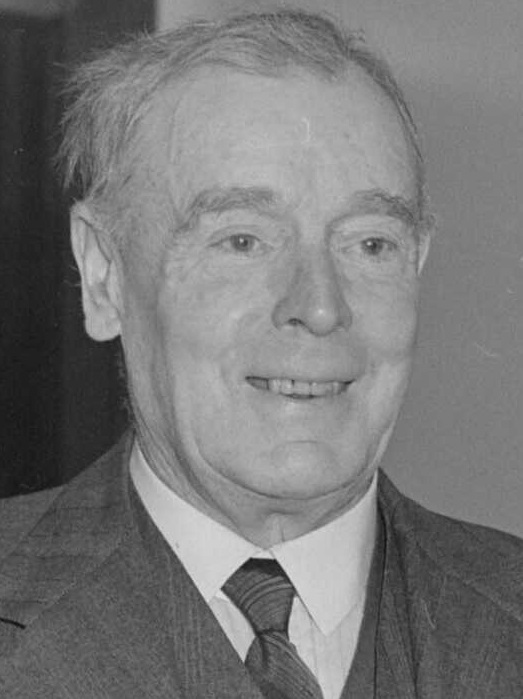
William Henry Price

=== Officer (OBE) ===
Civil division

- Harold Galt Dickie – of Rotorua. For public and local government services.
- Frederick James Earle – of Nelson. For services to journalism.
- Joseph William Hadfield – of Christchurch. For services to agriculture, and especially in connection with the development of the linen flax industry.
- Arthur Kidd MB ChB – a medical practitioner at Waipiata Sanatorium.
- Herbert Seton Stewart Kyle – of Riccarton. For public and local government services.
- Albert Edward Lawrence – of Timaru. For services to the community, especially in the fields of sport, journalism and education.
- Tohuroa Hira Parata – of Wellington. For services to the Māori people, especially in the field of athletics.
- Stanley Rice – of Southland. For services to education and local government.
- Thomas Leonard Seddon – of Feilding. For services to the community.
- William Burgoyne Taverner – of Dunedin. For services to the community.
- Harold Temple White – of Wellington. For services to the community as a musician, especially in the training of school choirs.

Military division

- Commander Ralph Eric Harding VRD – Royal New Zealand Navy.
- Lieutenant-Colonel Edwjn Ernest Richards DSO – New Zealand Territorial Force.
- Wing Commander John William Henry Bray – Royal New Zealand Air Force.
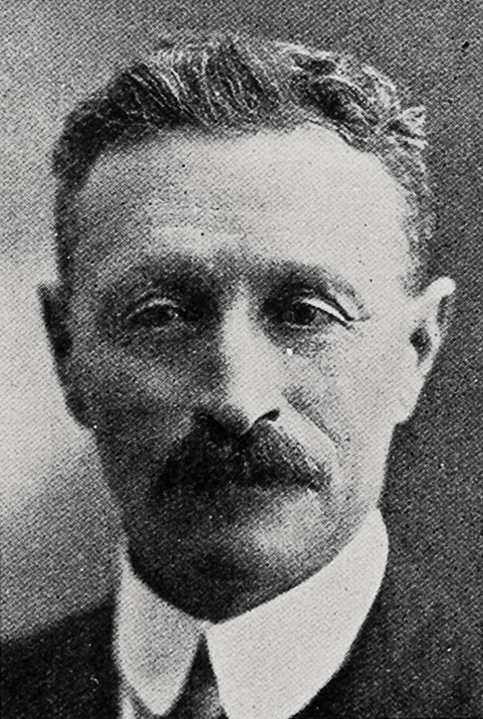
Harold Dickie

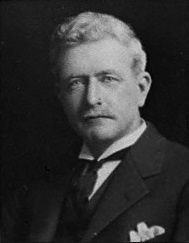
Bert Kyle

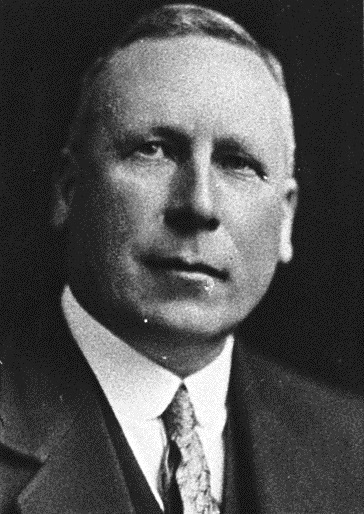
William Taverner

=== Member (MBE) ===
Civil division

- William Prentice Black – engineer of the Waimate County Council.
- Olive Mary Brown – of Invercargill. For patriotic and social welfare services.
- Rose Cadness – of Auckland. For services, to the community, especially in connection with social welfare and local government.
- Ivy Marion Cuthbert – of Auckland. For patriotic and social welfare services.
- Ethel Maude Field – of Palmerston North. For services to the community especially in connection with women's organisations.
- Elizabeth May Gillespie – district nurse at Ōpōtiki.
- Helen Dorothy Grant – formerly matron of Masterton Public Hospital.
- Charles Adolph Kitto – of Wellington. For services to sport.
- Irene Florence Land – honorary secretary–treasurer of the New Zealand War Amputees' Association.
- Lydia Rachel Livingstone – of Christchurch. For social welfare services, especially in the interests of servicemen.
- Vida Alice Milroy – of New Plymouth; a district nurse and nurse inspector for many years.
- The Reverend Albert Everil Orr – a Methodist city missioner in Auckland.
- Florence Amelia Pritchard – a voluntary aid at the Mowai Red Cross Hospital for many years.
- Caroline Ada Seville – of Morrinsville. For patriotic and social welfare services.
- Takurua Tamarau – a leading chief of the Bay of Plenty. For services to the Māori people.
- Yvette Winifred Williams – of Dunedin. For services in women's athletics.

Military division

- Lieutenant-Commander Ian Barclay Campbell VRD – Royal New Zealand Naval Volunteer Reserve.
- Warrant Officer Second Class Leonard Arthur Hobbs – New Zealand Territorial Force.
- Captain (temporary Major) Edward George Taylor – New Zealand Regiment.
- Warrant Officer First Class (temporary) Edward James Trappitt – Royal New Zealand Electrical and Mechanical Engineers.
- Flight Lieutenant Raymond John Maltby Haggett – Air Training Corps, Royal New Zealand Air Force.
- Warrant Officer Ernest Wallace Bolton – Royal New Zealand Air Force.
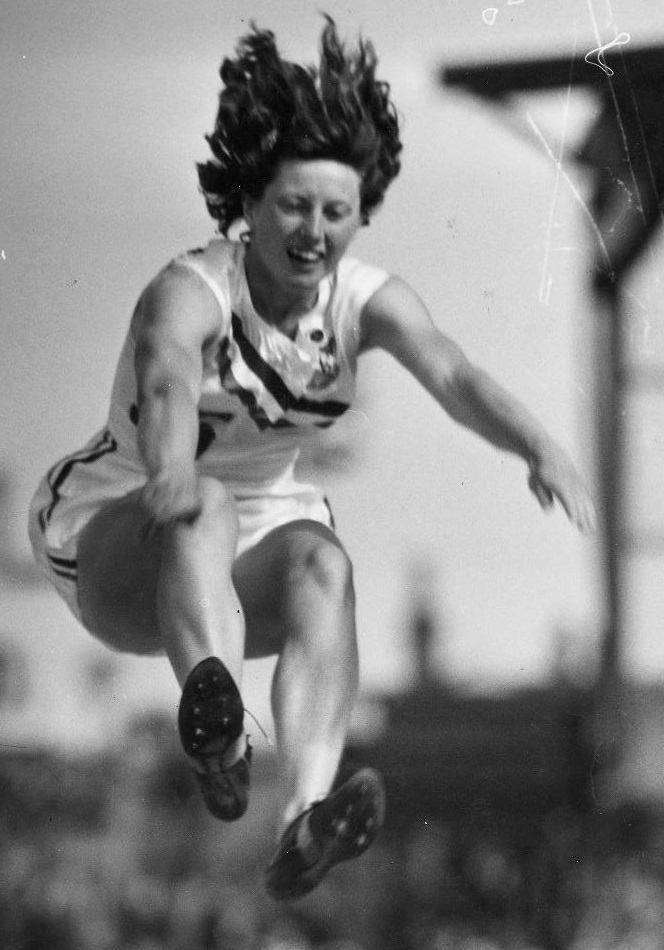
Yvette Williams

== British Empire Medal (BEM) ==
Civil division

- William George Mence – chauffeur, Public Service Garage, Wellington.
- Thomas Elliott Reid – station officer, New Zealand Fire Service, Wellington.

Military division

- Master-at-Arms Keith Frederick Connew – Royal New Zealand Navy.
- Temporary Chief Petty Officer Telegraphist Eric Andrew Sorenson – Royal New Zealand Navy.
- Staff-Sergeant (temporary Warrant Officer First Class) William Raymond Sutherland – Royal New Zealand Engineers.
- Flight Sergeant Harold Budd Dalton – Royal New Zealand Air Force.

== Air Force Cross (AFC) ==
- Squadron Leader Sidney Maxwell Hope MBE – Royal New Zealand Air Force.
