= Massey University Archives =

University archives in New Zealand

Coordinates: 40.3896°S 175.6191°E

Massey University Archives (Māori: Ā Te Kunenga tukunga kōrero) is an academic archive and the official repository for the records of Massey University and its predecessor institutions, including Massey Agricultural College, Wellington Polytechnic, Palmerston North University College, and Palmerston North College of Education. The archives also house collections from university-affiliated institutions and include records relating to New Zealand individuals, businesses, and community, cultural, and professional organisations. Together, the collections comprise more than 2,300 linear metres of material dating from the 1840s to the present. Digital collections are made available through Tāmiro, the archives' online discovery platform.

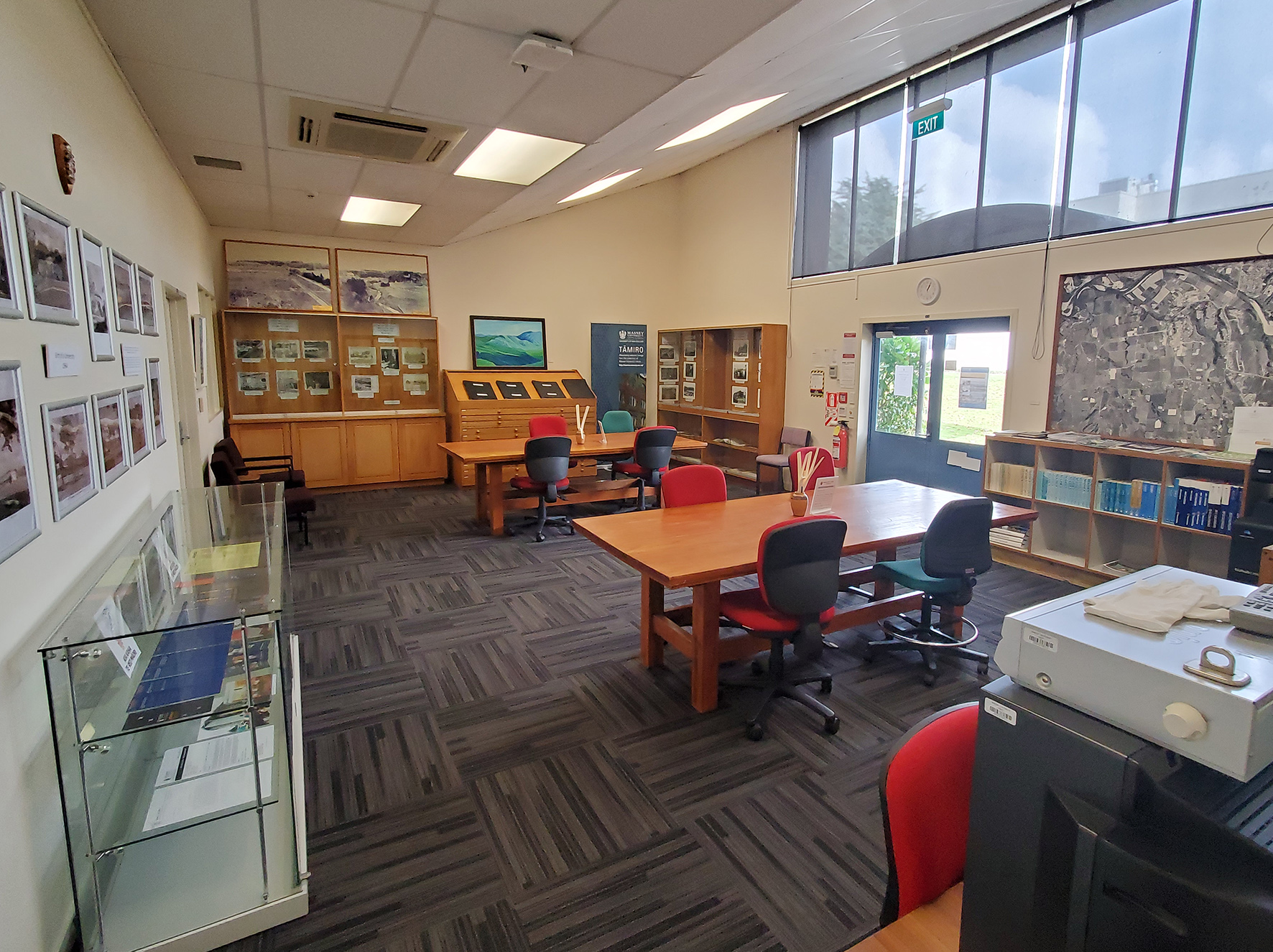
The reading room at Massey University Archives in 2024.

== History ==
The establishment of the Massey University Archives dates to 1984 when a committee was appointed to establish a university archive by finding a suitable space, assembling and organising archival material and appointing an archivist. At the start of 1986 the university archives opened its doors to researchers.

Discussions regarding the creation of a formal archival repository had taken place within the university library and the Academic board for several decades before the archives were established. The university's golden jubilee in 1977 prompted efforts to consolidate historical materials, improve access, and reduce the risk of loss. As the jubilee approached, it became increasingly clear that an archive repository was essential for this purpose.

During its first couple of decades the archives was served by part-time and contract staff. The first full-time university archivist was appointed in 2006. In 2013 the first permanent archives assistant was appointed. A dairy records archivist was added to the staff of the university archives after the Dairy Records Archives became part of the university archives. In 2018 the first assistant archivist joined the staff. The university archives is administered by the Massey University Library.

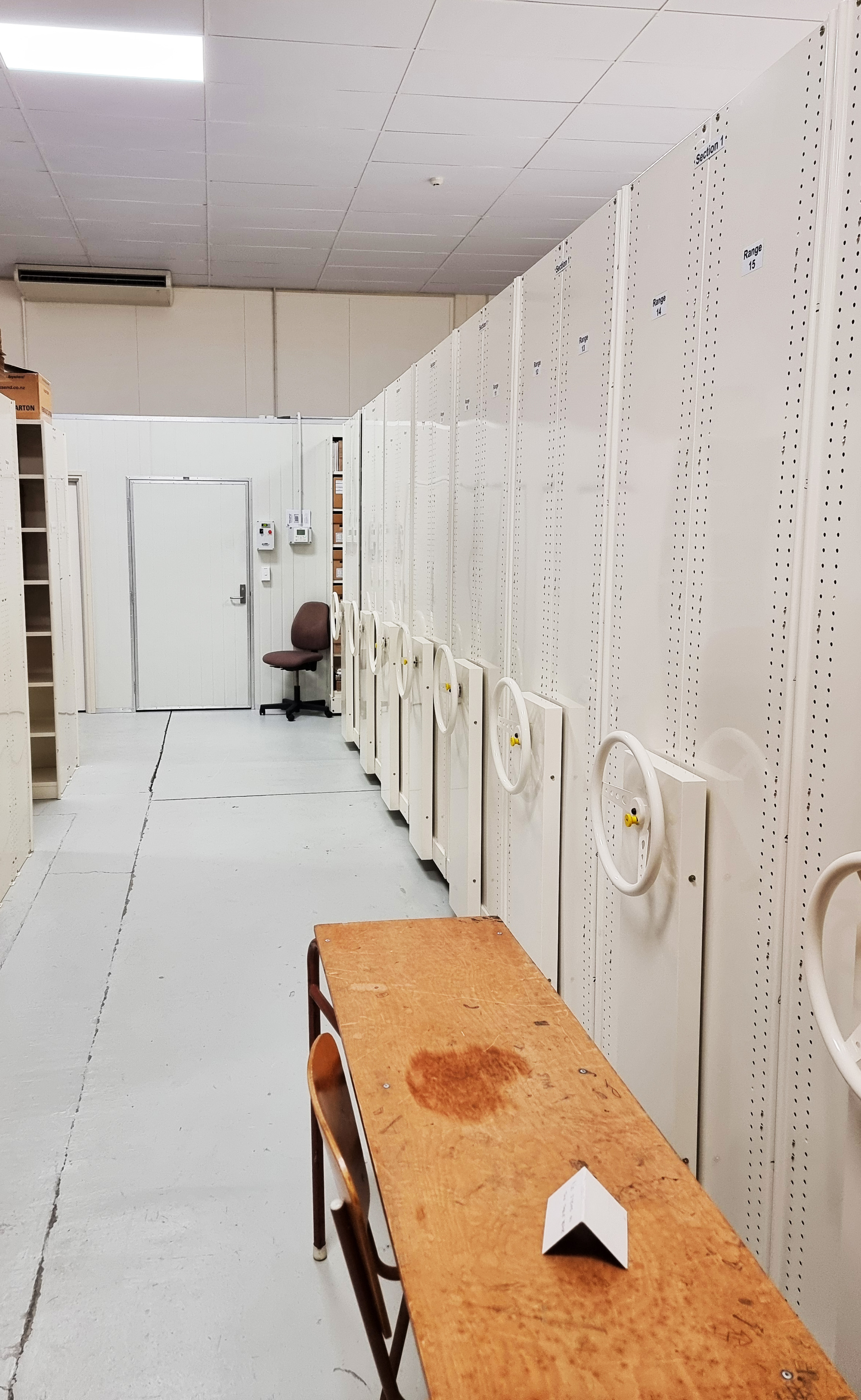
View of the archival storerooms at Massey University Archives in 2025, showing some shelving units used to house archival collections.

The University Archives’ first home was a room in the basement of the Old Main Building, now known as the Sir Geoffrey Peren Building. Adjacent rooms were added to the archives over time. In August 2012 the University Archives was moved to purpose-built archival accommodation in the Practical Teaching Complex. This space was officially opened by the university's Vice-Chancellor Steve Maharey on 18 February 2013. The University Archives includes a reading room, staff offices, processing rooms, and secure archival storage areas.

=== List of University Archivists ===
- Keith Carwell-Cooke, 1986–1989
- Julie Miller, 1989–1999
- Lucy E. Marsden, 2000–2005
- Jhr. Louis A. Changuion, 2006–present

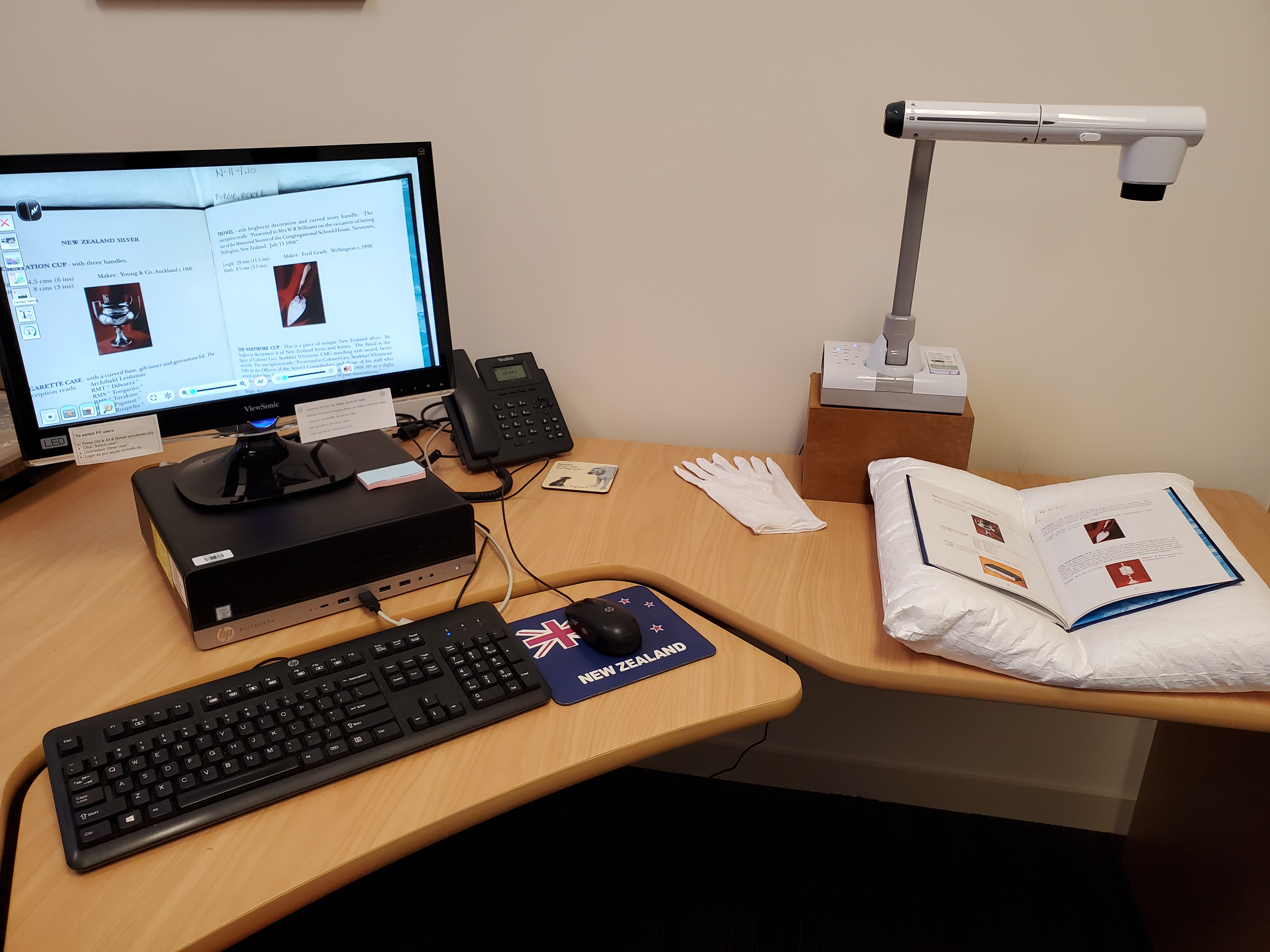
The virtual reading room at Massey University Archives, 2023.

== Collections ==
The collections of the University Archives comprise more than 2,300 linear metres and are grouped into two parts: the institutional archive of the university and the collecting archive. Together, these collections cover the period from the 1840s to the present and include records, photographs, publications, films and other audiovisual formats, artworks relating to the history and development of the university, architectural drawings and site plans, and museum objects.

The institutional archives contain the records of Massey University and its antecedent institutions, encompassing the period from the 1880s to the present. These collections cover:

- Massey University (1964–present)
- Massey University College of Manawatu (1963)
- Massey Agricultural College (1926–1962)
- Palmerston North University College (1960–1962)
- Palmerston North College of Education (1956–1996), and
- Wellington Polytechnic (1886–1999)

In addition, the institutional archives contain archival material of affiliated bodies, such as students’ associations and clubs, and records relating to staff, students, alumni and benefactors of the university.

The collecting archive, called the New Zealand Institutions (NZI) Collection, covers the period from the 1840s to the present. It consists of archival material acquired from New Zealand individuals, businesses, and professional, cultural and community organisations. These collections generally have connections with Massey University and the subject areas it teaches and researches. The largest component of the NZI collection is the Dairy Records Archive, which is New Zealand's most extensive collection of records relating to the dairy industry and farming sector.

Among the many and varied collections held by Massey University Archives are:

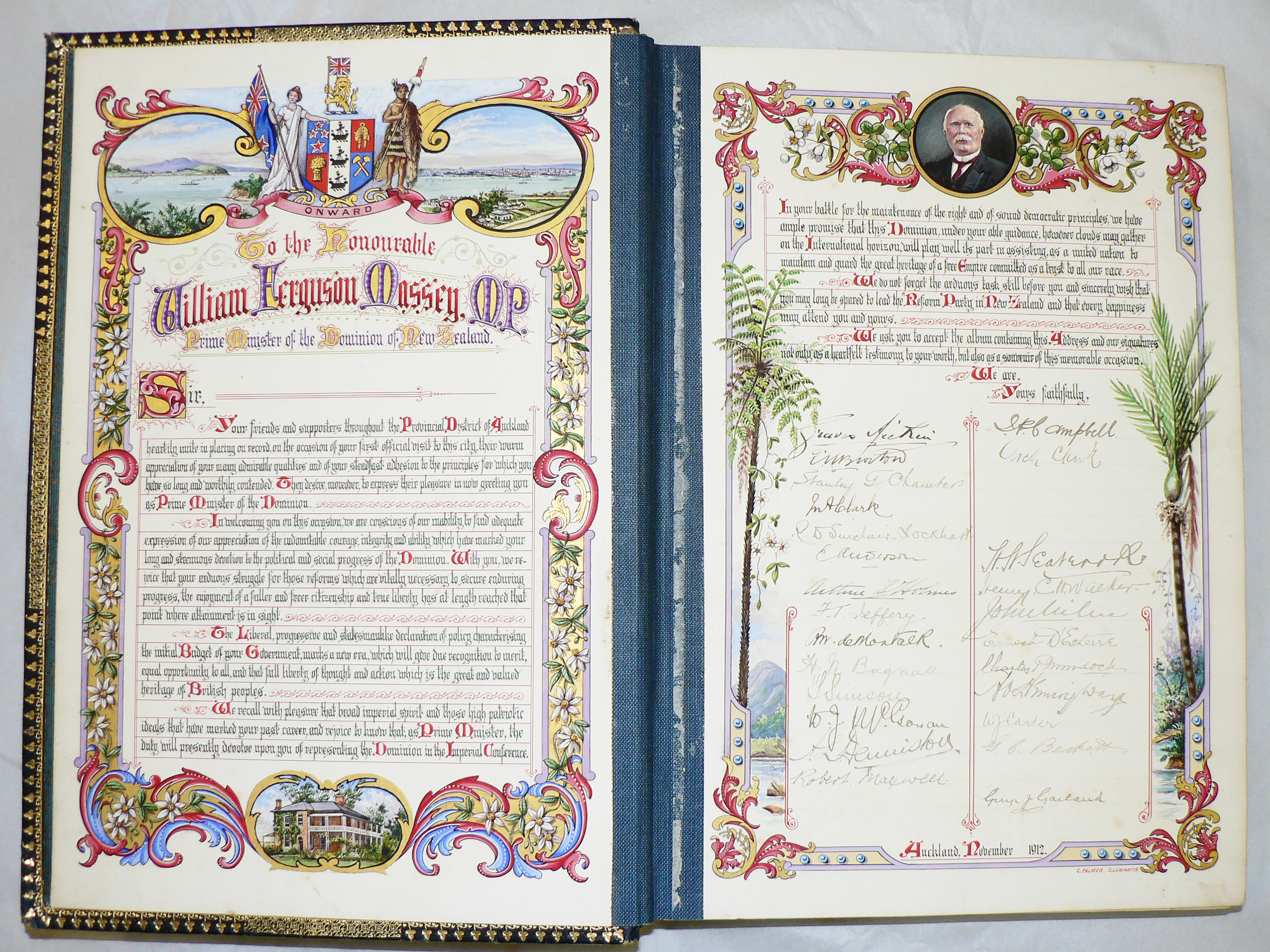
Illuminated address dedicated to Prime Minister William Massey, November 1912. (W.F. Massey Collection)

- W.F. Massey Collection
- Charles Alma Baker Trust Archive
- Donkey and Mule Society of New Zealand
- Dr. Sir Alan Stewart Collection
- Federation des Alliances Françaises de Nouvelle-Zélande Incorporated
- Eric Warr Collection
- James Skerman Collection
- John Whitelock Collection
- L.C. (Len) Bayliss Collection
- Manawatu Co-operative Dairy Company Limited
- Massey University Drama Society
- Massey University Football Club
- Massey University Students’ Association (MUSA)
- Massey University Students’ Association Federation
- Mosen Dairy Farm Diaries
- New Zealand Rhododendron Association
- New Zealand Wheatgrowers’ Co-operative Association Limited
- New Zealand Wool Board
- Prof. Glynnis M. Cropp Collection
- Prof. Michael Roche Collection
- Prof. Sir Geoffrey S. Peren Collection
- Te Rehunga (place & district)
- Veterinary Services Council

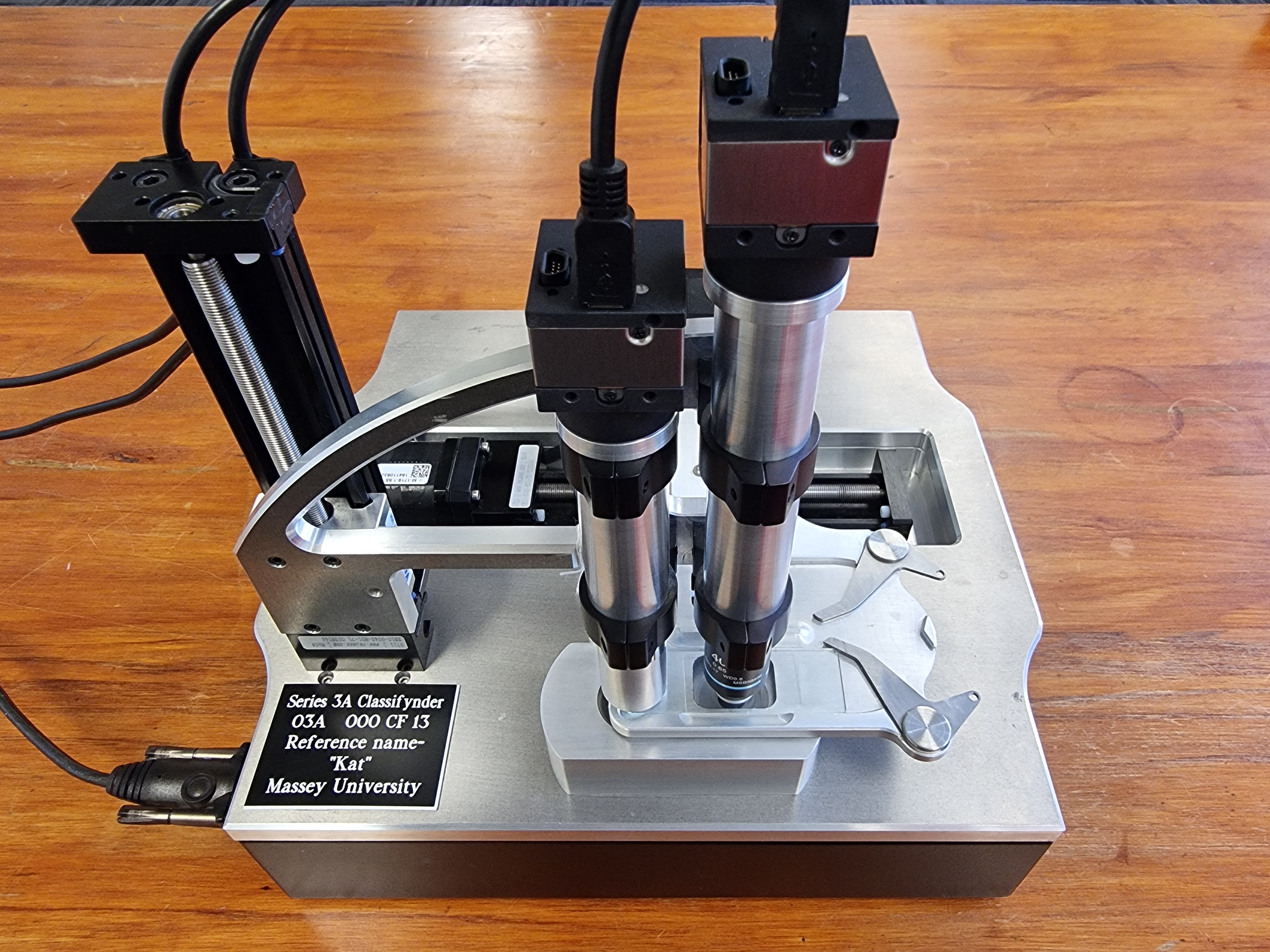
Classifynder Series 3A automated digital microscope, developed at Massey University in 2013 for palynological analysis. This example is held at the University Archives.

In 2016, the University Archives, together with Massey University Library’s Special Collections, implemented the Recollect platform to make their collections available in digital format to researchers. Their instance of the platform is known as Tāmiro.
