= Fitzherbert =

Suburb of Palmerston North, New Zealand

- Suburb
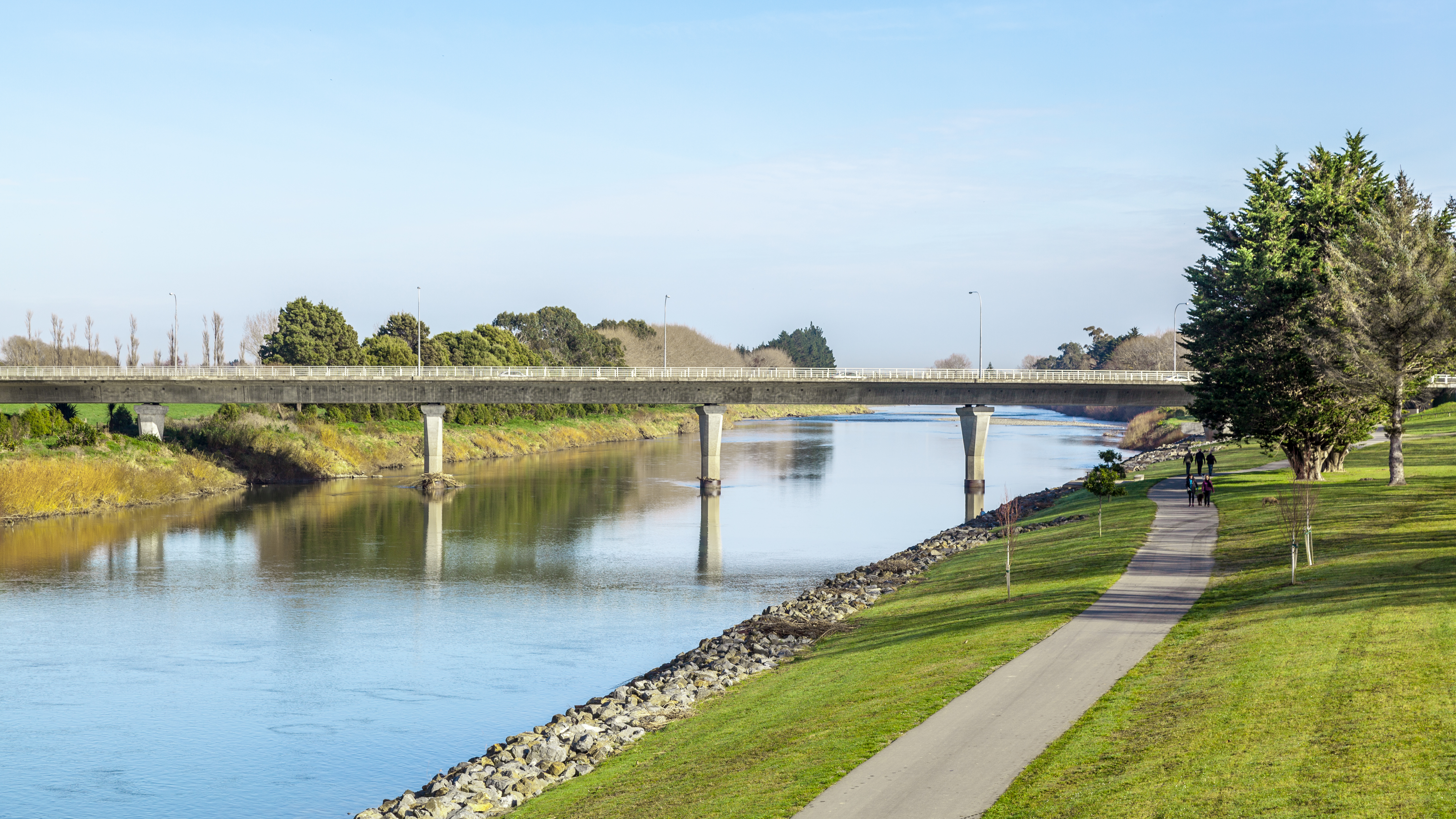
- Fitzherbert Bridge Over Manawatū River
- Interactive map of Fitzherbert
- Coordinates: 40.388°S 175.636°E
- Country: New Zealand
- City: Palmerston North
- Local authority: Palmerston North City Council
- Electoral ward: Te Hirawanui General Ward; Te Pūao Māori Ward

Area
  - Land: 701 ha (1,730 acres)

Population (June 2025)
  - Total: 4,700
  - Density: 670/km^{2} (1,700/sq mi)
- Postcode: 4410

	(Manawatū River)	Aokautere
Massey University	Fitzherbert
		Turitea

Fitzherbert (also known as Summerhill) is a suburb of Palmerston North, Manawatū-Whanganui, New Zealand.

The Massey University Manawatu Campus is west and northwest of Fitzherbert.

The Food HQ was established north of the Massey University campus in 1971, and includes Plant & Food Research, Fonterra and Massey University research facilities.

== History ==
Fitzherbert developed from James Prendergast's Tiritea Estate in 1871. In 1926 John Batchelar sold his adjacent estate to the Palmerston North Borough Council for the establishment of an agricultural college. The Massey Agricultural College was established and later became Massey University.

== Demographics ==
Fitzherbert covers 7.01 km^{2} (2.71 sq mi) and had an estimated population of 4,700 as of June 2025, with a population density of 670 people per km^{2}.

Historical population
Year	Pop.	±% p.a.
2006	2,700	—
2013	2,907	+1.06%
2018	3,315	+2.66%
2023	4,317	+5.42%

Fiztherbert had a population of 4,317 in the 2023 New Zealand census, an increase of 1,002 people (30.2%) since the 2018 census, and an increase of 1,410 people (48.5%) since the 2013 census. There were 2,043 males, 2,253 females, and 21 people of other genders in 1,467 dwellings. 3.6% of people identified as LGBTIQ+. There were 777 people (18.0%) aged under 15 years, 852 (19.7%) aged 15 to 29, 1,971 (45.7%) aged 30 to 64, and 717 (16.6%) aged 65 or older.

People could identify as more than one ethnicity. The results were 70.1% European (Pākehā); 9.1% Māori; 2.0% Pasifika; 24.6% Asian; 3.4% Middle Eastern, Latin American and African New Zealanders (MELAA); and 2.6% other, which includes people giving their ethnicity as "New Zealander". English was spoken by 95.6%, Māori by 2.6%, Samoan by 0.1%, and other languages by 25.1%. No language could be spoken by 2.0% (e.g. too young to talk). New Zealand Sign Language was known by 0.8%. The percentage of people born overseas was 35.0, compared with 28.8% nationally.

Religious affiliations were 32.1% Christian, 4.4% Hindu, 4.0% Islam, 0.4% Māori religious beliefs, 2.4% Buddhist, 0.1% New Age, 0.3% Jewish, and 2.0% other religions. People who answered that they had no religion were 48.0%, and 6.0% of people did not answer the census question.

Of those at least 15 years old, 1,431 (40.4%) people had a bachelor's or higher degree, 1,575 (44.5%) had a post-high school certificate or diploma, and 537 (15.2%) people exclusively held high school qualifications. 675 people (19.1%) earned over $100,000 compared to 12.1% nationally. The employment status of those at least 15 was 1,830 (51.7%) full-time, 510 (14.4%) part-time, and 78 (2.2%) unemployed.

Individual statistical areas
Name	Area (km^{2})	Population	Density (per km^{2})	Dwellings	Median age	Median income
Poutoa	2.72	2,385	877	855	45.7 years	$42,900
Fitzherbert	4.29	1,932	450	612	35.1 years	$57,900
New Zealand					38.1 years	$41,500
