= Massey University Library =

Library system in New Zealand

Coordinates: 36.7333°S 174.7006°E

Massey University Library (Māori: Te Putanga ki te ao Mātauranga) is the library system of Massey University, serving the teaching, research, and study needs of staff, on-campus, and distance students. The library operates campus libraries at the university's three locations: Auckland, Palmerston North, and Wellington. In addition to the campus libraries, the library system includes an offsite storage facility and the University Archives, both located at the Manawatū campus.

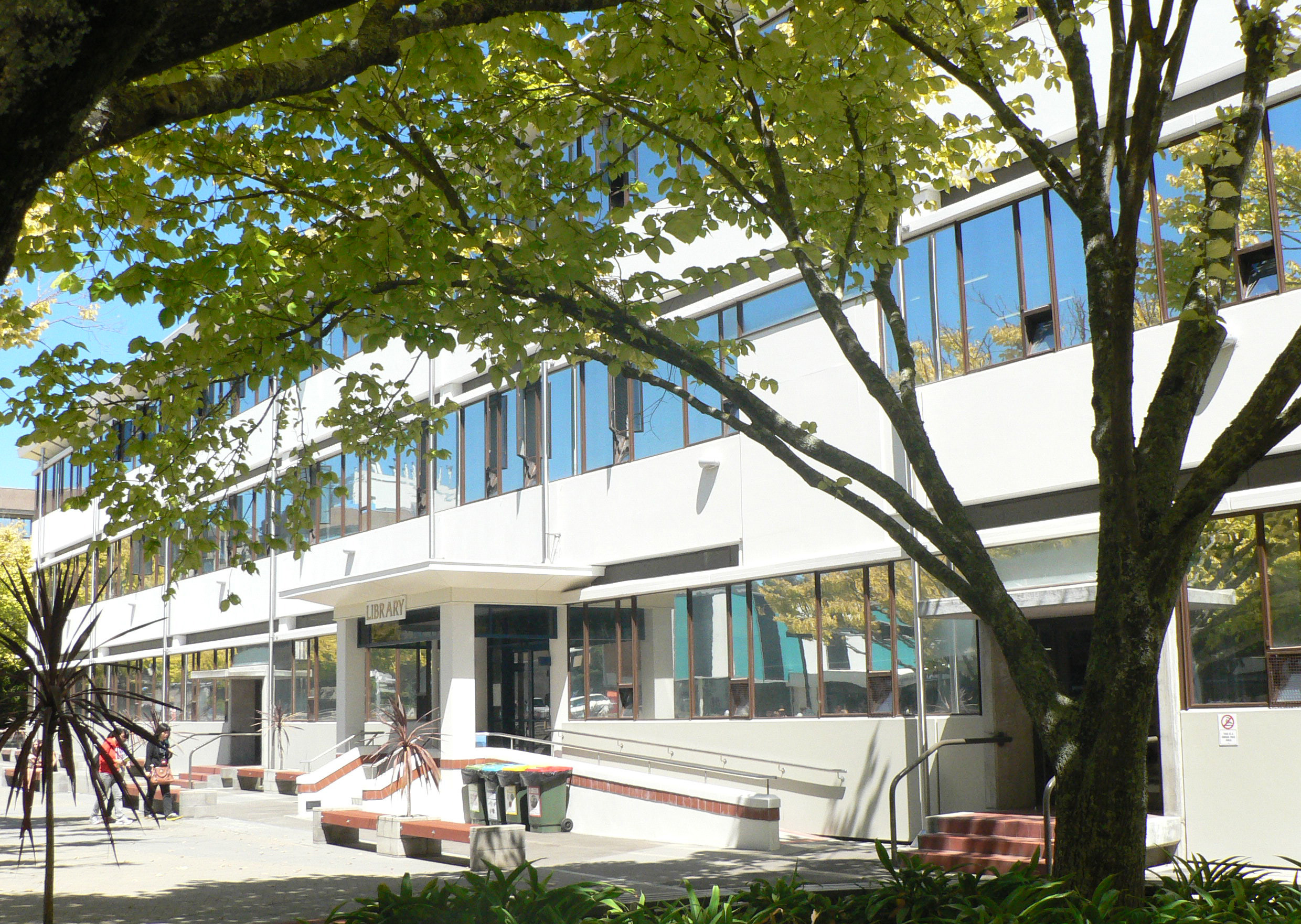
Massey University Library Manawatū campus, 2013

== History ==
Massey Agricultural College, New Zealand's second agricultural college, opened in 1928 and appointed its first part-time librarian in 1930. Early years were marked by limited resources due to the Great Depression. Some relief was received in the form of a grant from the Carnegie Corporation in 1937.

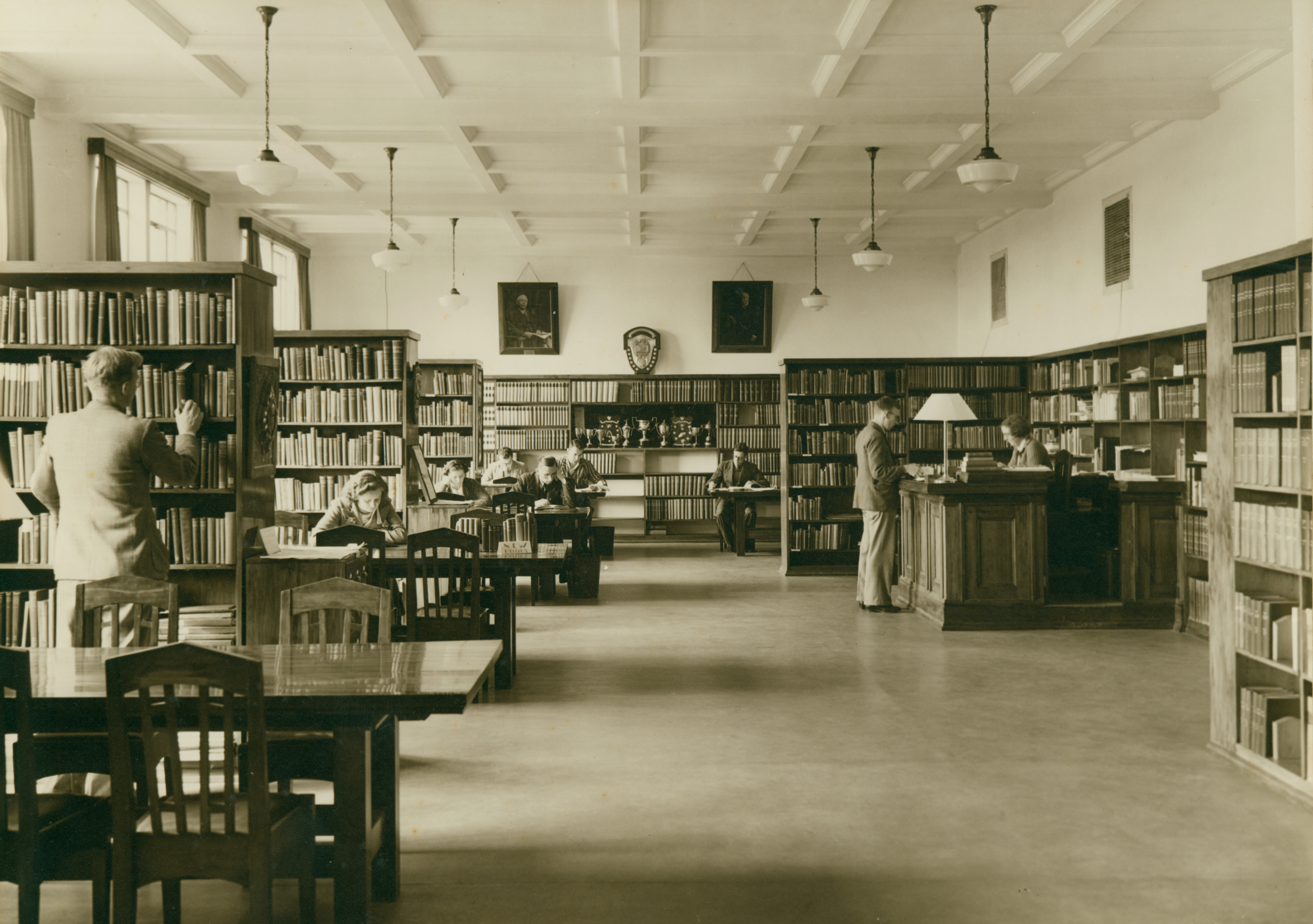
Massey Agricultural College Library, 1948

In 1938, the college appointed its first full-time librarian. By 1946, the library had expanded to more than 10,000 volumes and the continuous upkeep of journal collections was prioritised. During the 1950s, the library began developing its archives. In addition to college staff and students, the library serve surrounding research institutions, including the Dairy Research Institute and parts of the Department of Scientific and Industrial Research. By 1963, the collection had grown to over 34,000 volumes.

In 1963, Massey College merged with Palmerston North University College (PNUC), combining their libraries. Lloyd Jenkins was appointed head librarian in 1965 and worked to integrate the libraries, standardise cataloguing systems, and improve the collection. A new dual-purpose Library/Arts Building opened in 1968 but quickly became overcrowded. As student numbers and academic programs grew, the library faced mounting pressure. To relieve pressure, an extension request was approved in 1984.

A feature of Massey University Library since the 1960s has been its service to not only on-campus students but also a large network of distance students nationwide and globally. Through its postal lending service, students could request and receive books and journal articles.

During the 1980s, the library embraced computer technology under Jenkins, who initiated computerised systems for cataloguing and circulation. His successor, Bill Blackwood, continued these efforts, increasing staff and services. In 1984, Massey's library became the first university library in New Zealand to fully automate its cataloguing and circulation systems.

The 1990s saw the library expanding as the university grew through the establishment of new campuses and mergers with other institutions. Significant events include the opening of a campus library at the university's Albany campus on Auckland's North Shore in 1993 and the acquisition of satellite libraries through mergers with the Palmerston North College of Education (1996) and Wellington Polytechnic (1999). These mergers led to the integration of additional libraries and an expansion of the library's collection to 1.3 million volumes. The University Archives became part of the library during this period.

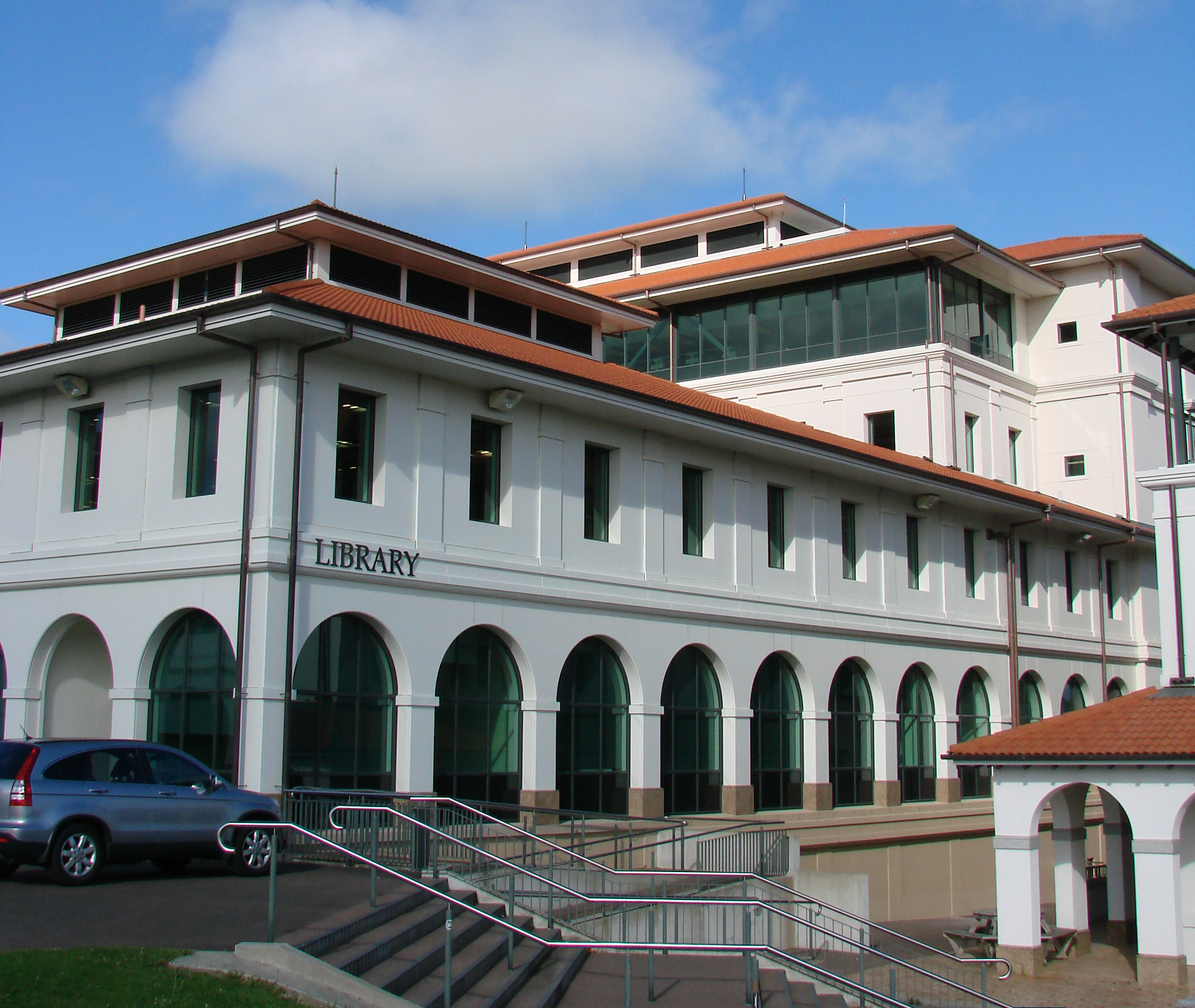
Massey University Library, Auckland campus, 2009

Under John Redmayne, who served as University Librarian from 2002, the library integrated technology further, enhancing its online services. Despite financial challenges in the 2000s, service levels were maintained by improving its physical and digital infrastructure and collections, acquiring significant resources like the Māori Land Court Records. To lead the development of Māori services, a Kaihautū Māori position was established in 2004, and in 2007 the library implemented the Millennium management system.

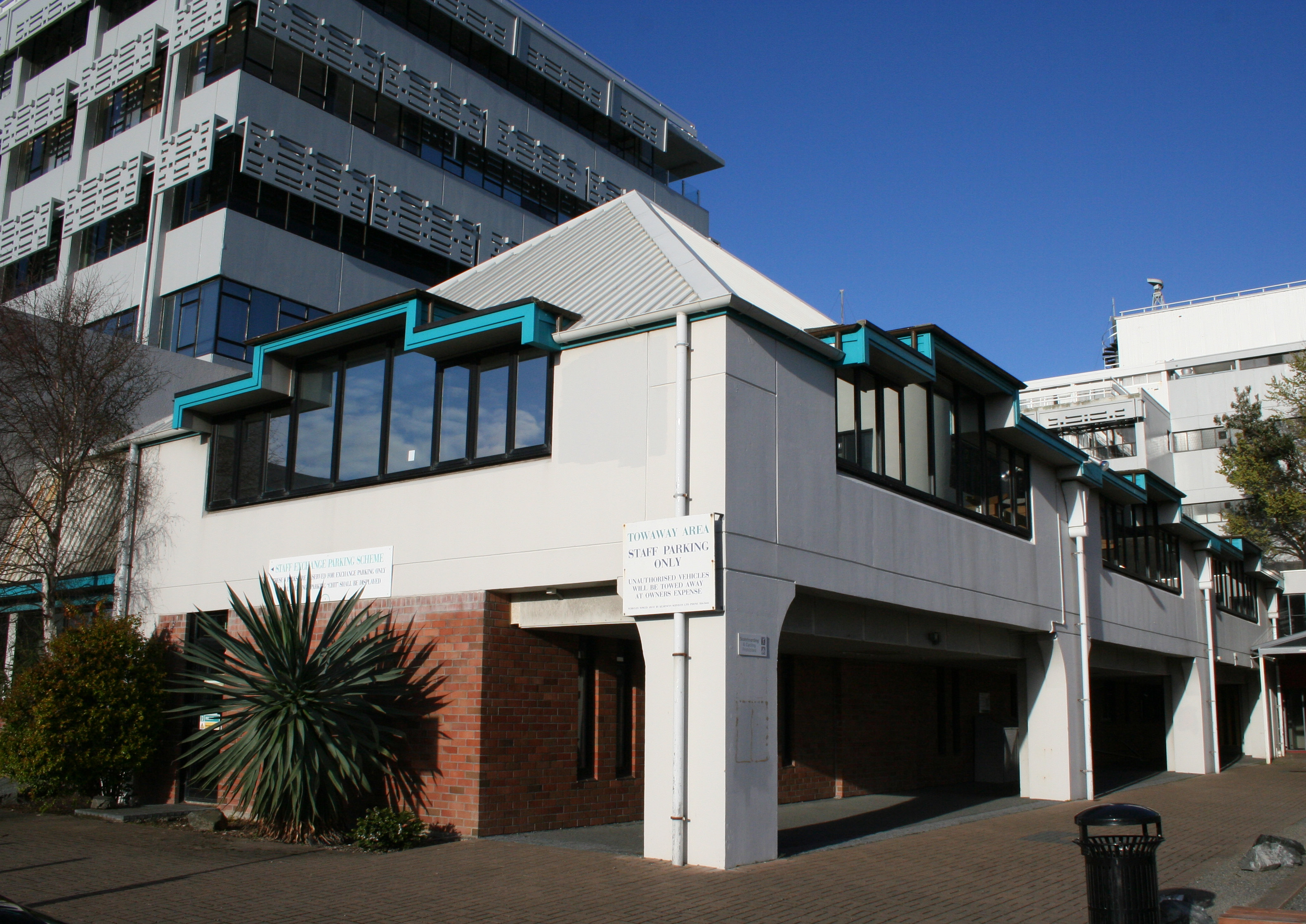
Massey University Library, Wellington campus, 2008

During the 2010s, the library expanded its physical spaces and collections, benefiting from a favourable economic climate. Customer satisfaction remained high, and the library continued to enhance its digital offerings. Linda Palmer's tenure, starting in 2014, saw further transformation with a focus on digital resources, dynamic learning environments, and online education. The Tāmiro platform was launched in 2016, improving research support and digital engagement.

During the COVID-19 pandemic, the library adapted to the challenges, continuing to provide services through enhanced electronic resources and innovative services. In recent years, the library adopted the Folio library system platform, becoming the first in Oceania to do so, and emphasised its commitment to Te Tiriti o Waitangi, ensuring inclusivity and cultural engagement.

== Structure ==
Massey University Library is part of the academic support services of the university. The University Librarian reports to the Provost and is supported by a Library Advisory Committee. The library is organised into two main divisions: client services and resources and technology, each managed by an Associate University Librarian. The campus libraries are managed by campus librarians, each with a focus tailored to the specific needs of their campus.

The Auckland campus library specialises in business, health sciences, social sciences, and the sciences. The Manawatū campus library has a comprehensive collection covering the humanities, social sciences, business, and sciences, particularly in agriculture, horticulture, and veterinary science. The Wellington campus library's collection strengths include fine arts, photography, design, screen arts, music, and communications.

Across all campuses, the library provides a range of shared and campus-specific services. Centralised services based at the Manawatū campus include Collection Services, Māori and Pacific Services, and Digital Services. Client Services and Information and Research Services are offered at each campus library, with the latter including information literacy education, where library staff teach students and staff how to effectively locate, evaluate, and use information resources for academic success.

== Systems ==
The library’s operations rely on the digital services and systems, which are essential to delivering comprehensive library support. It maintains various computing resources, including information commons computers, public-access terminals, staff workstations, and generic workstations. Users access these services through various platforms, including the library’s online portal and mobile apps, which provide access to resources, library accounts, and search tools. The library’s main platform, FOLIO, supports core functions such as the management of library resources, user accounts, and circulation, which streamlines workflows and enhances service delivery.

Significant technological services include the library’s automated management system, mobile access solutions, and access to e-journals and databases through special licensing agreements. A key feature is the discovery layer, which enables users to search both the library catalogue and journal databases from a single interface, improving access to resources. Over recent decades, the library has made substantial investments in digitising its collections, including the retrospective digitisation of theses and materials from special collections. The library’s repository, Massey Research Online (MRO), houses digitised research outputs, including theses, research papers, and reports, and is integrated with research databases to enhance accessibility.

== Collections and holdings ==
The library's physical and digital collections serve the university community's teaching and research needs. Shaped by user preferences and technological advances, the character of the collections has changed during the twenty-first century. By 2023, the library held more than 400,000 print titles, nearly 700,000 electronic titles, and nearly 140,000 serial titles of which most are available online.

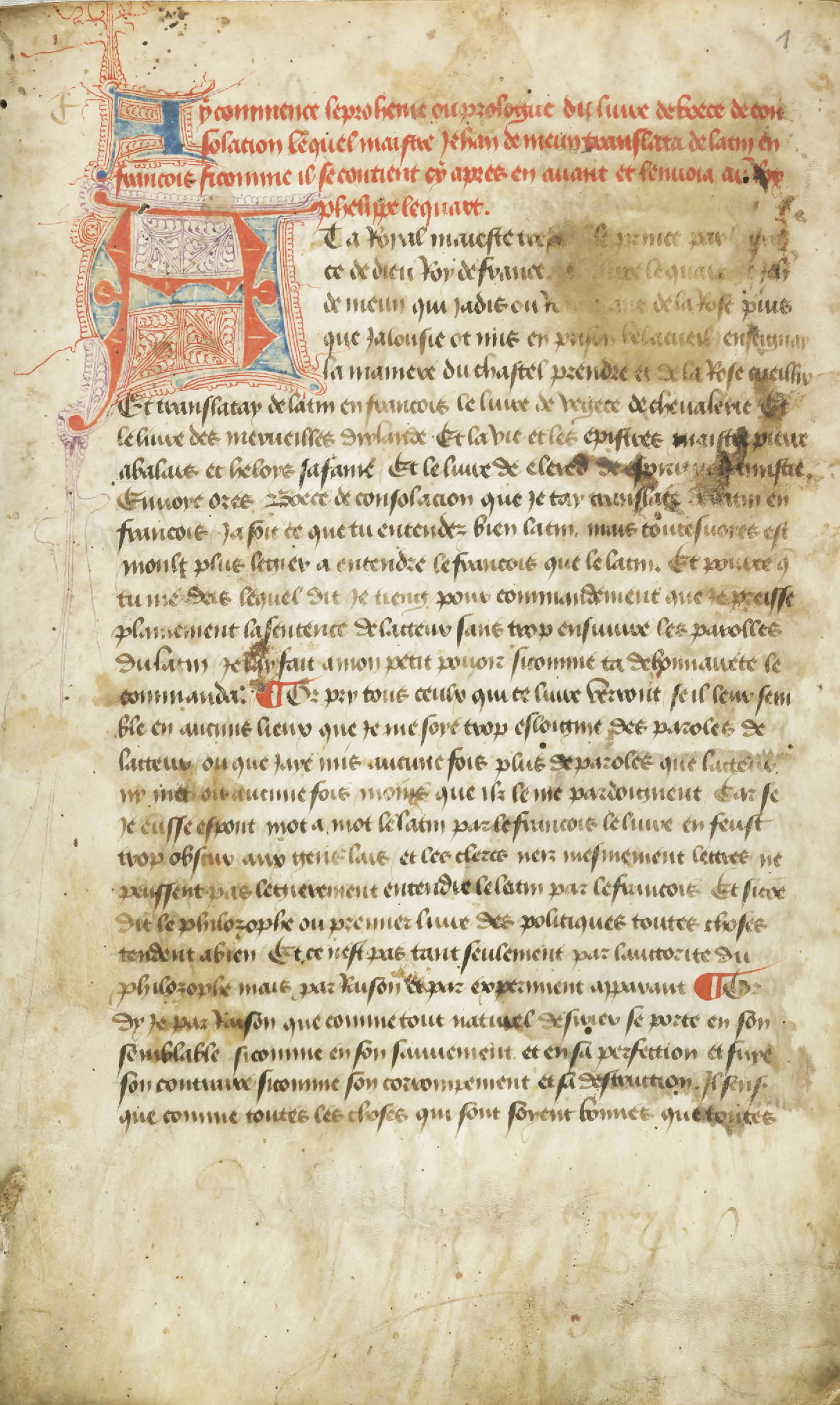
A page from Le Livre de Boece de Consolacion, a 15th-century French translation of Boethius’s Consolatio Philosophiae, held in Massey University Library Special Collections.

Special Collections include rare manuscripts, such as a fifteenth-century copy of the Le Livre de Boece de Consolacion, Pictures of the Old and New Testaments (seventeenth century), Stubb’s Anatomy of the Horse (1815 reprint), and The Art Album of New Zealand Flora (1889). Some of its other notable collections include the Bagnall collection, comprising items from the personal holdings of bibliographic scholar Austin Graham Bagnall, and the Glyn Harper Military collection, which contains materials which consists of materials related to military history.

The University Archives, administered by the library, serve as the official archives and a collecting archive for the university.

== College and University Librarians ==
Massey Agricultural College Librarians:

- Erica Baillie (part-time), 1930–1932
- Miss M.B. Hainsworth, 1932–1935
- Louisa C. Sheppard (part-time), 1936–1937
- F. Arthur Sandall, 1938–1944
- Joan A. Swinbourn (acting), 1944–1946
- Harry D. Erlam, 1947–1951
- Mary G. Campbell, 1951–1963

Massey University Librarians

- Mary G. Campbell (acting), 1964
- D. Lloyd Jenkins, 1965–1983
- J.W. (Bill) Blackwood, 1983–1991
- Helen Renwick, 1991–2001
- John Redmayne, 2002–2014
- Linda Palmer, 2014–present
