= Massey University, Palmerston North =

University campus and surrounds in Palmerston North

Massey University
- Suburb
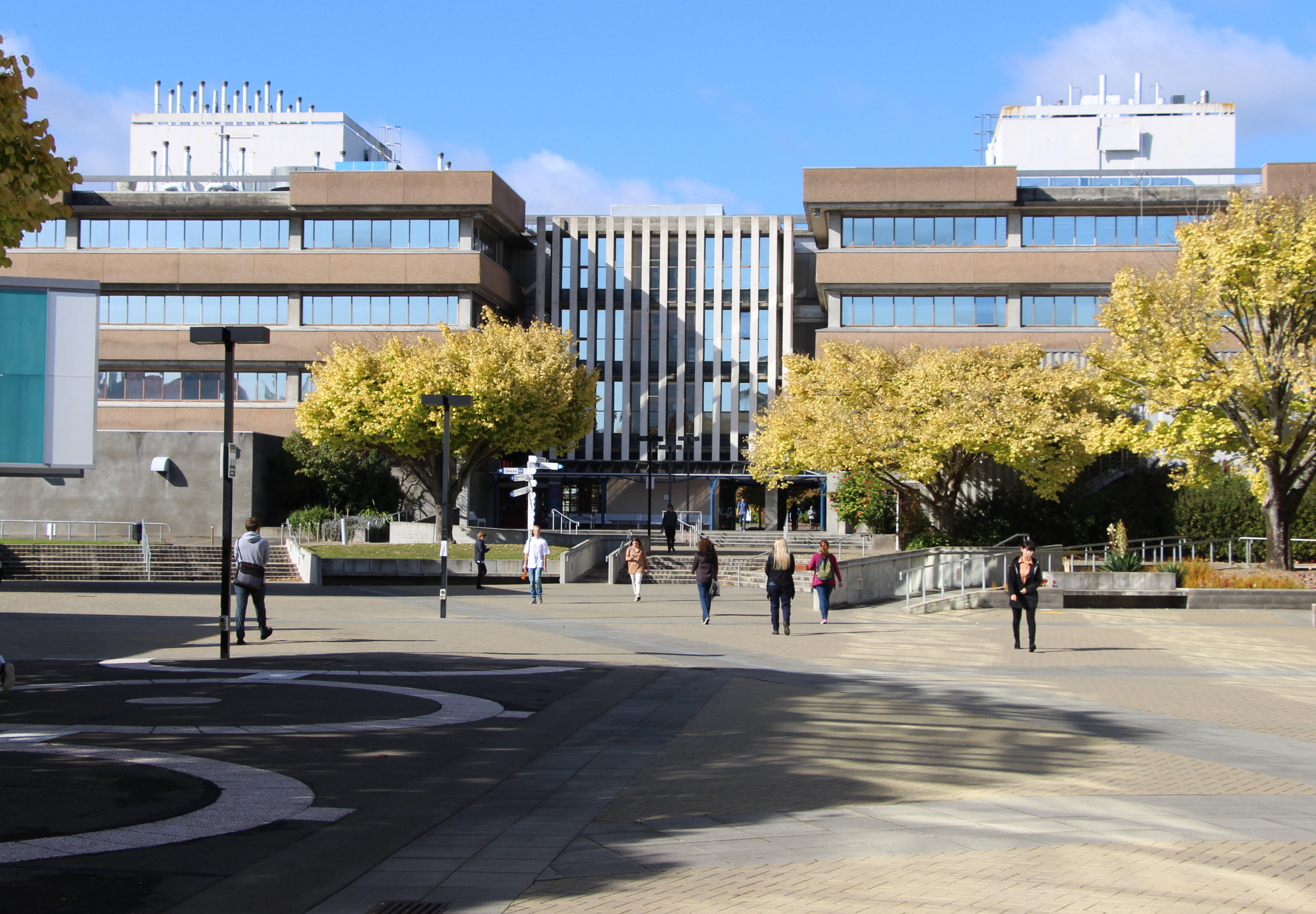
- Massey University Palmerston North campus
- Interactive map of Massey University
- Coordinates: 40.386°S 175.618°E
- Country: New Zealand
- City: Palmerston North
- Local authority: Palmerston North City Council
- Electoral ward: Te Hirawanui General Ward; Te Pūao Māori Ward

Area
  - Land: 972 ha (2,400 acres)

Population (June 2025)
  - Total: 350
  - Density: 36/km^{2} (93/sq mi)
- Postcode: 4472

	(Manawatū River)
	Massey University	Fitzherbert
Linton Military Camp	Pihauatua	Turitea

The Palmerston North campus is the original campus of Massey University, founded in 1927 as Massey Agricultural College. Located south of the city of Palmerston North, the campus covers approximately 40 hectares and is surrounded by university-owned farmland, much of which is used for agricultural training. The campus accommodates a range of academic and administrative units, including teaching and research in sciences, humanities and social sciences, business, and health, as well as the office of the Vice-Chancellor. Massey University owns more than 2,000 hectares (4,900 acres) of farmland across eight farms, most of which are situated near the Manawatū campus.

== Description ==
The Turitea area is the historic part of the campus and has multiple historic buildings from the original agricultural college including: Tiritea House, the Old Registry, the Refectory, the Sir Geoffrey Peren Building, McHardy Hall, the Student Centre, and the business studies buildings.

== History ==
The Palmerston North campus is the site of Massey Agricultural College, in 1926 a farm in Fitzherbert known as the Turitea Estate was purchased in 1926 by the Palmerston North Borough Council for the site of the national agricultural college. The McHardy Homestead was also purchased by the council to be used by the college. The McHardy building was divided in two to become the principal's residence (Tiritea House) and the Old Registry. The college required more than this building however, and hired Roy Lippincott to design new buildings for the college. a Spanish Mission style was chosen for the buildings and this style was applied to later buildings to give consistency across the campus.

During the Second World War with the Army Staff College being established on the campus in 1941. Most of the buildings were taken over by the army during this time and new ones such as McHardy Hall were constructed. The college regained control of the campus in 1944. In 1968 a new student centre was constructed and two business study buildings were constructed in from 1987 to 1988.

In 2024 the historic part of the campus was registered as the Turitea Historic Area by Heritage New Zealand.

== Demographics ==
The Turitea statistical area, which includes Massey University’s Manawatū campus but does not include the Turitea suburb to the southeast, covers 9.72 km^{2} (3.75 sq mi). It had an estimated population of 350 as of June 2025, giving a population density of 36 people per km^{2}.

Historical population
Year	Pop.	±% p.a.
2006	696	—
2013	696	+0.00%
2018	444	−8.60%
2023	339	−5.25%

Turitea had a population of 339 in the 2023 New Zealand census, a decrease of 105 people (−23.6%) since the 2018 census, and a decrease of 357 people (−51.3%) since the 2013 census. There were 138 males, 201 females, and 3 people of other genders in 36 dwellings. 13.3% of people identified as LGBTIQ+. The median age was 21.0 years (compared with 38.1 years nationally). There were 6 people (1.8%) aged under 15 years, 255 (75.2%) aged 15 to 29, 75 (22.1%) aged 30 to 64, and 6 (1.8%) aged 65 or older.

People could identify as more than one ethnicity. The results were 59.3% European (Pākehā); 10.6% Māori; 2.7% Pasifika; 30.1% Asian; 6.2% Middle Eastern, Latin American and African New Zealanders (MELAA); and 1.8% other, which includes people giving their ethnicity as "New Zealander". English was spoken by 98.2%, Māori by 3.5%, and other languages by 31.9%. New Zealand Sign Language was known by 0.9%. The percentage of people born overseas was 41.6, compared with 28.8% nationally.

Religious affiliations were 22.1% Christian, 3.5% Hindu, 3.5% Islam, 2.7% Buddhist, and 1.8% other religions. People who answered that they had no religion were 61.1%, and 6.2% of people did not answer the census question.

Of those at least 15 years old, 90 (27.0%) people had a bachelor's or higher degree, 204 (61.3%) had a post-high school certificate or diploma, and 42 (12.6%) people exclusively held high school qualifications. The median income was $11,400, compared with $41,500 nationally. 9 people (2.7%) earned over $100,000 compared to 12.1% nationally. The employment status of those at least 15 was 57 (17.1%) full-time, 63 (18.9%) part-time, and 24 (7.2%) unemployed.
