= Aokautere =

Suburb of Palmerston North

Coordinates: 40°22′S 175°40′E

- Suburb
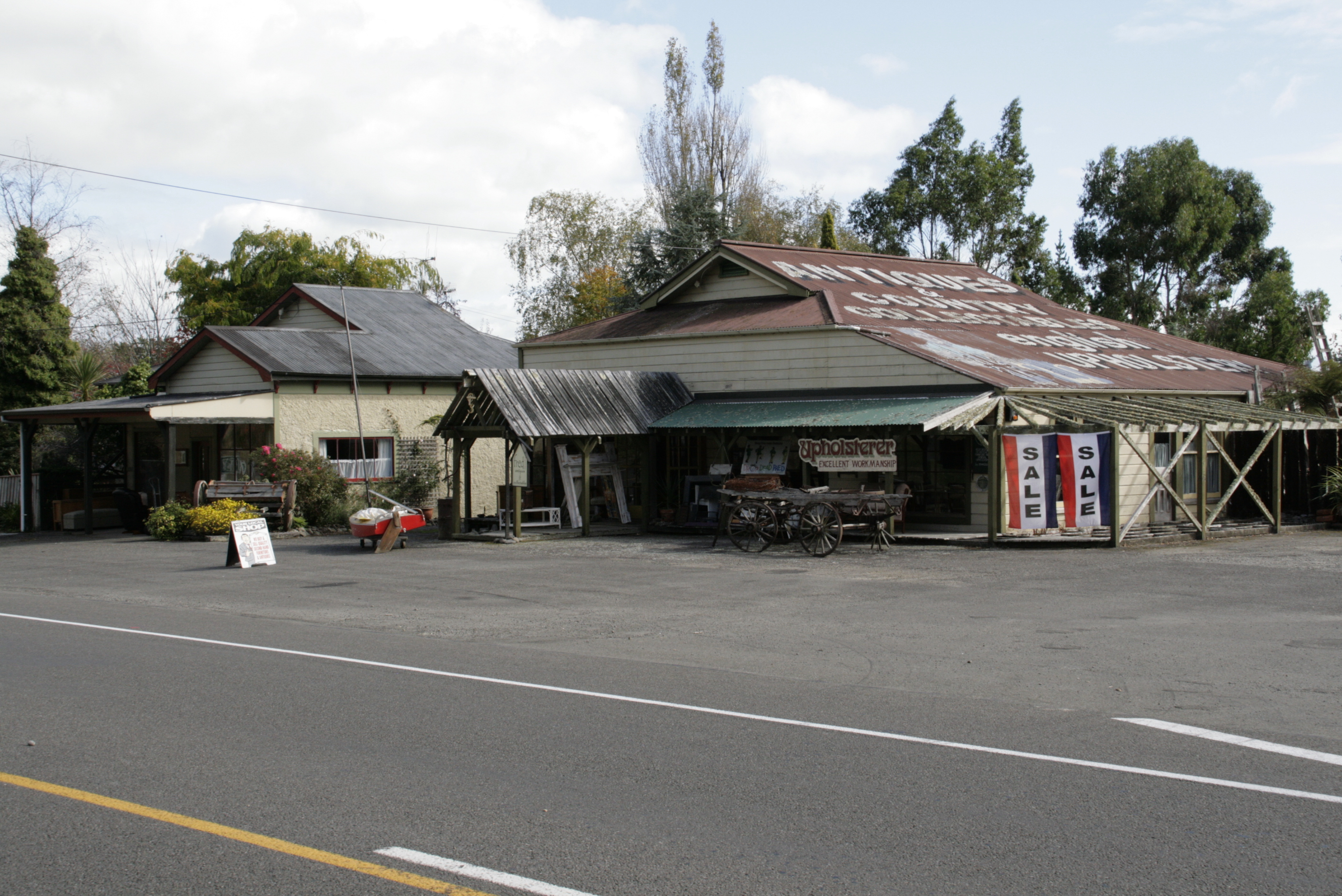
- Historic building
- Interactive map of Aokautere
- Country: New Zealand
- City: Palmerston North
- Local authority: Palmerston North City Council
- Electoral ward: Te Hirawanui General Ward; Te Pūao Māori Ward

Area
  - Land: 712 ha (1,760 acres)

Population (June 2025)
  - Total: 850
  - Density: 120/km^{2} (310/sq mi)
- Postcode: 4471

| | (Manawatū River) |
| | Aokautere | Ballance |
| Fitzherbert | Turitea | Pahiatua |

Aokautere is a suburb of the New Zealand city of Palmerston North. It is situated in the cliffs on the south banks of the Manawatū River.

Aokautere is named after Te Aokautere, a great Rangitāne chief during the late 18th century. In the 19th century, it was known as Fitzherbert, after the politician William Fitzherbert who promoted settlement of the Manawatu. The Fitzherbert East Dairy Factory building still carries the name these days.

Aokautere has views of the Ruahine and Tararua Ranges (with the Wind Turbine Farms) and on a clear day it is possible to see Ruapehu.

Anzac Park (Te Motu-o-Poutoa), a clifftop reserve colloquially known as Pork Chop Hill, has views across the city, through to the southern Ruahine and northern Tararua ranges. It is also possible to see distant Taranaki and Ruapehu. There is also access to the Stairway of Tāne (Te Arapiki-a-Tāne), steps cut into the former Anzac Cliffs, now collapsed into a slope.

Prior to 1996, Aokautere was part of the Manawatu electorate. However, due to the reformation of the electoral system from FPP to MMP, the electorate of Palmerston North's boundaries were redrawn to include Aokautere. Palmerston North's electorate boundaries were redrawn in 2007 and Aokautere was shifted to the Rangitikei electorate. Rangitikei as of 2020 is represented by National MP Ian McKelvie, who was elected in 2011.

== Demographics ==
Aokautere statistical area covers 7.12 km^{2} (2.75 sq mi) and had an estimated population of 850 as of June 2025, with a population density of 119 people per km^{2}.

Historical population for Aokautere
| Year | Pop. | ±% p.a. |
|---|---|---|
| 2006 | 567 | — |
| 2013 | 666 | +2.33% |
| 2018 | 765 | +2.81% |
| 2023 | 822 | +1.45% |

Aokautere had a population of 822 in the 2023 New Zealand census, an increase of 57 people (7.5%) since the 2018 census, and an increase of 156 people (23.4%) since the 2013 census. There were 417 males and 402 females in 258 dwellings. 2.6% of people identified as LGBTIQ+. The median age was 42.8 years (compared with 38.1 years nationally). There were 168 people (20.4%) aged under 15 years, 141 (17.2%) aged 15 to 29, 393 (47.8%) aged 30 to 64, and 117 (14.2%) aged 65 or older.

People could identify as more than one ethnicity. The results were 88.0% European (Pākehā); 11.3% Māori; 1.1% Pasifika; 8.4% Asian; 0.4% Middle Eastern, Latin American and African New Zealanders (MELAA); and 1.5% other, which includes people giving their ethnicity as "New Zealander". English was spoken by 97.8%, Māori by 4.4%, and other languages by 9.5%. No language could be spoken by 1.1% (e.g. too young to talk). New Zealand Sign Language was known by 1.1%. The percentage of people born overseas was 24.5, compared with 28.8% nationally.

Religious affiliations were 32.1% Christian, 1.5% Hindu, and 1.8% other religions. People who answered that they had no religion were 58.4%, and 5.8% of people did not answer the census question.

Of those at least 15 years old, 237 (36.2%) people had a bachelor's or higher degree, 327 (50.0%) had a post-high school certificate or diploma, and 87 (13.3%) people exclusively held high school qualifications. The median income was $57,400, compared with $41,500 nationally. 177 people (27.1%) earned over $100,000 compared to 12.1% nationally. The employment status of those at least 15 was 348 (53.2%) full-time, 105 (16.1%) part-time, and 6 (0.9%) unemployed.

=== Aokautere Rural ===
Aokautere Rural is a statistical area east and southeast of Aokautere, which covers 85.71 km^{2} (33.09 sq mi) and had an estimated population of 1,080 as of June 2025, with a population density of 12.6 people per km^{2}.

Historical population for Aokautere Rural
| Year | Pop. | ±% p.a. |
|---|---|---|
| 2006 | 537 | — |
| 2013 | 819 | +6.22% |
| 2018 | 888 | +1.63% |
| 2023 | 1,050 | +3.41% |
The 2006 population is for a smaller area of 83.31 km^{2}. Source:

Aokautere Rural had a population of 1,050 in the 2023 New Zealand census, an increase of 162 people (18.2%) since the 2018 census, and an increase of 231 people (28.2%) since the 2013 census. There were 525 males and 522 females in 354 dwellings. 2.0% of people identified as LGBTIQ+. The median age was 41.8 years (compared with 38.1 years nationally). There were 222 people (21.1%) aged under 15 years, 162 (15.4%) aged 15 to 29, 513 (48.9%) aged 30 to 64, and 150 (14.3%) aged 65 or older.

People could identify as more than one ethnicity. The results were 88.3% European (Pākehā); 10.0% Māori; 0.9% Pasifika; 6.3% Asian; 2.9% Middle Eastern, Latin American and African New Zealanders (MELAA); and 4.0% other, which includes people giving their ethnicity as "New Zealander". English was spoken by 96.3%, Māori by 1.7%, and other languages by 9.7%. No language could be spoken by 2.9% (e.g. too young to talk). New Zealand Sign Language was known by 0.3%. The percentage of people born overseas was 20.0, compared with 28.8% nationally.

Religious affiliations were 28.6% Christian, 2.0% Islam, 0.3% Māori religious beliefs, 1.4% Buddhist, 1.1% Jewish, and 1.7% other religions. People who answered that they had no religion were 59.4%, and 6.0% of people did not answer the census question.

Of those at least 15 years old, 300 (36.2%) people had a bachelor's or higher degree, 426 (51.4%) had a post-high school certificate or diploma, and 102 (12.3%) people exclusively held high school qualifications. The median income was $58,600, compared with $41,500 nationally. 213 people (25.7%) earned over $100,000 compared to 12.1% nationally. The employment status of those at least 15 was 516 (62.3%) full-time, 126 (15.2%) part-time, and 12 (1.4%) unemployed.

== Education ==
Aokautere School is a co-educational state primary school for Year 1 to 6 students, with a roll of 139 as of March 2026. It opened in 1889 as Fitzherbert East School and was renamed Aokautere School in 1968.

The Institute of the Pacific United (IPU, formerly International Pacific College) is located in Aokautere.
