= Mary Greig Campbell =

New Zealand librarian and Quaker

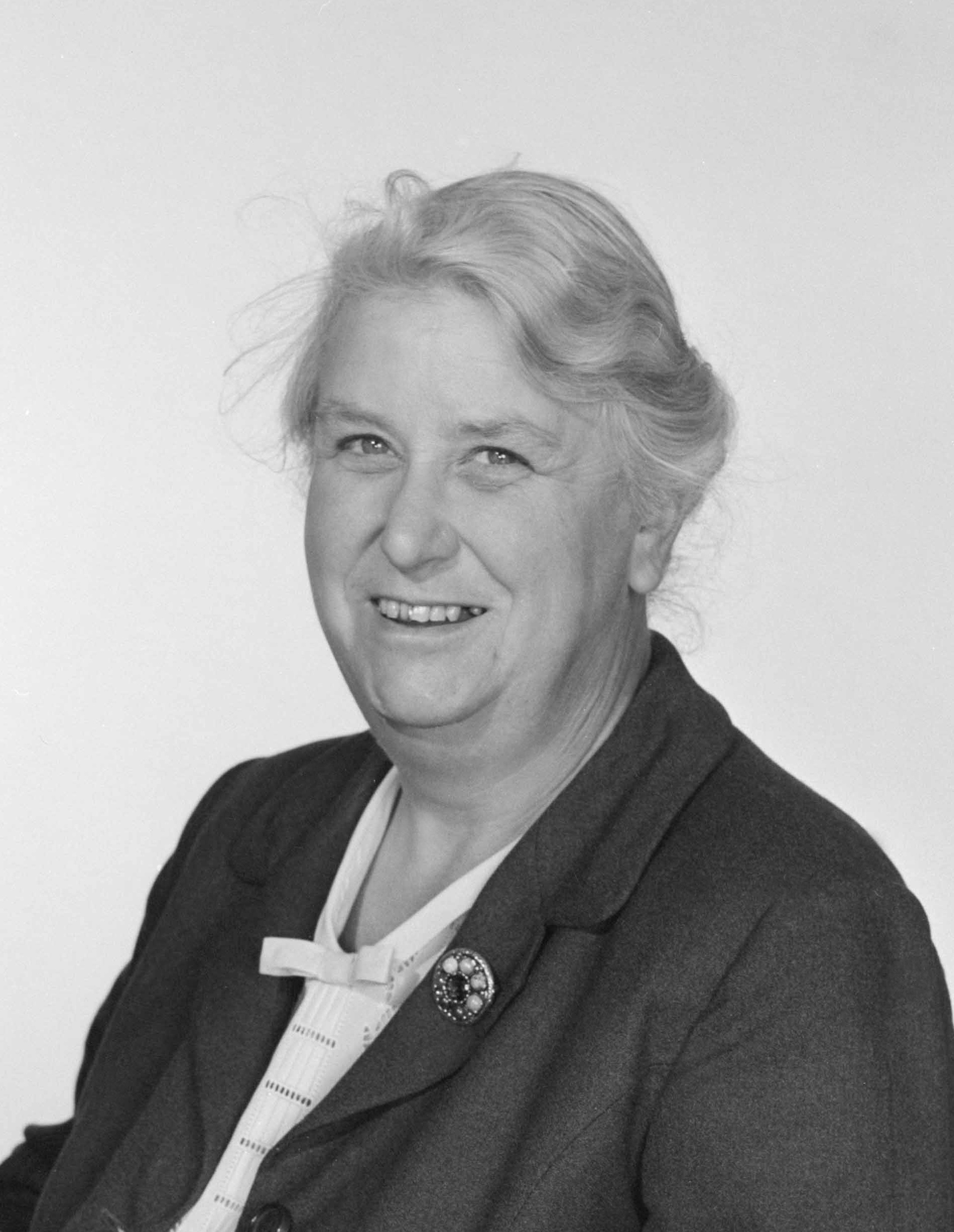
- Born: 17 November 1907; Duns, Berwickshire, Scotland
- Died: 22 April 1989 (aged 81); Foxton, New Zealand
- Education: University of Edinburgh
- Occupation: Librarian
- Parents: Alexander John Campbell (father); Joanna Alexander Greig (mother)

Mary Greig Campbell (1907–1989) was a New Zealand librarian, Quaker and relief worker in Shanghai, China, after World War II.

== Biography ==
Campbell was born in Duns, Berwickshire, Scotland, on 17 November 1907. Her father was a doctor, Alexander John Campbell, and her mother was a nurse, Joanna Alexander Greig. She attended Berwickshire high school from 1918 to 1924 and graduated from University of Edinburgh in 1928. The following year, she passed her diploma examination at the School of Librarianship, University College, London.

Over the next four years she worked at the National Library of Scotland in Edinburgh. She then returned to London to work as a registry clerk in the head office of the British Broadcasting Corporation, later moving on to supervise the establishment of central filing system in the BBC's Scottish offices in Edinburgh, Glasgow and Aberdeen. It was while she was living in Edinburgh that Mary, and her widowed mother, joined the Society of Friends (Quakers).

=== Emigration ===
To take an available position at the Wellington Library, Campbell emigrated to New Zealand in 1939. She soon joined the local Quaker meeting in Wellington and in May 1940 she attended the Society's 32nd General Meeting. There, during a time of impending world war, Campbell confirmed that she "supported conscientious objectors at Armed Forces Appeal Board hearings and during detention, assisted interned aliens and their families, and, reflecting her concern for the needs of a post-war world, was an active member of the Quaker Relief and Reconstruction Committee."

=== Shanghai years ===
In 1945, with the end of World War II, New Zealand Quakers were recruited to form the Friends Ambulance Unit (China) Reinforcements Committee. Campbell was named secretary of the group and "became the driving force in the venture for the next two years." In 1947, she was named secretary at the Friends' Centre, Shanghai, where she worked among desperate refugees. She labored there for more than three years, providing shelter, food and clothing as well as looking after the children who arrived at the Centre lost and destitute.

By 1950, however, the atmosphere in China had become much more hostile, forcing the Quakers to withdraw from Shanghai. Campbell travelled to Britain in May 1950 to report on conditions in China, but her side trip to Europe caused her to lose a year before she could arrange to travel home. Eventually, she was able to return to New Zealand and take the position of head librarian at Massey Agricultural College later in 1951.

Over the following years, Campbell continued to make significant contributions to the Society of Friends and in 1965 she joined two Australian Quakers on a new mission to South East Asia.

=== Later years ===
Campbell served Massey Agricultural College and later Massey University for a total of 21 years, retiring from her role as Associate Librarian in 1972. She did not marry and remained closely connected to the Quaker community throughout her life. She died on 22 April 1989 in Lonsdale Hospital, Foxton, New Zealand.

== Externals sources ==
- Brodie, J. & A. Brodie, eds. Seeking a new land: Quakers in New Zealand: a volume of biographical sketches P.161-170, Wellington; Beechtree Press. 1993
- Mary Greig Campbell archival papers, Alexander Turnbull Library, Wellington, New Zealand
