= Jean McKenzie =

New Zealand diplomat

Jean Robertson McKenzie, CBE (19 January 1901 – 1 or 2 July 1964), was a New Zealand diplomat. She was the first woman to head a New Zealand diplomatic post.

== Biography ==
Born in Edendale, Southland, and originally named Jane, McKenzie attended Edendale School and Southland Technical College. She worked for a time as a secretary and administrator for the Post Office in Invercargill, and later for the Public Works Department. She was eventually transferred to Wellington, and when the Prime Minister's Department was founded in 1926, she took up a position with the nascent New Zealand diplomatic service.

Initially, McKenzie was secretary to Carl Berendsen, head of the Imperial Affairs Section. The IAS was responsible for relations with the rest of the British Empire — other diplomatic activity was handled by Britain at the time. She was part of New Zealand's delegation to an economic conference in Ottawa, and in 1936, she was posted to London, serving under High Commissioner Bill Jordan. In 1941, when New Zealand decided to establish a diplomatic post in Washington, McKenzie was transferred, becoming the post's Second Secretary soon after it opened. She then held positions in New Zealand's representation to Australia and the United Nations before finally being assigned to the new legation in Paris. After serving as chargé d'affaires during its establishment, she was promoted to Minister in 1955. She was the first woman to reach that level in the New Zealand diplomatic service.

The French government made her a Commander of the Légion d'honneur in 1956, and she was also made a Commander of the Order of the British Empire in the 1953 New Year Honours. In 1953, she was awarded the Queen Elizabeth II Coronation Medal.

McKenzie retired back to New Zealand in 1956, living in Christchurch. She died eight years later. She never married, and did not have children.
