= Ethel Maude Field =

New Zealand community leader

Ethel Maude Field MBE (née Bryant, 20 December 1882 – 5 July 1967) was a New Zealand community leader. She was born in Wellington, New Zealand on 20 December 1882.

In the 1953 New Year Honours Field was appointed a Member of the Order of the British Empire for services to the community, especially in connection with women's organisations.
