= Geoffrey Peren =

New Zealand soldier, agricultural scientist (1892–1980)

Sir Geoffrey Peren
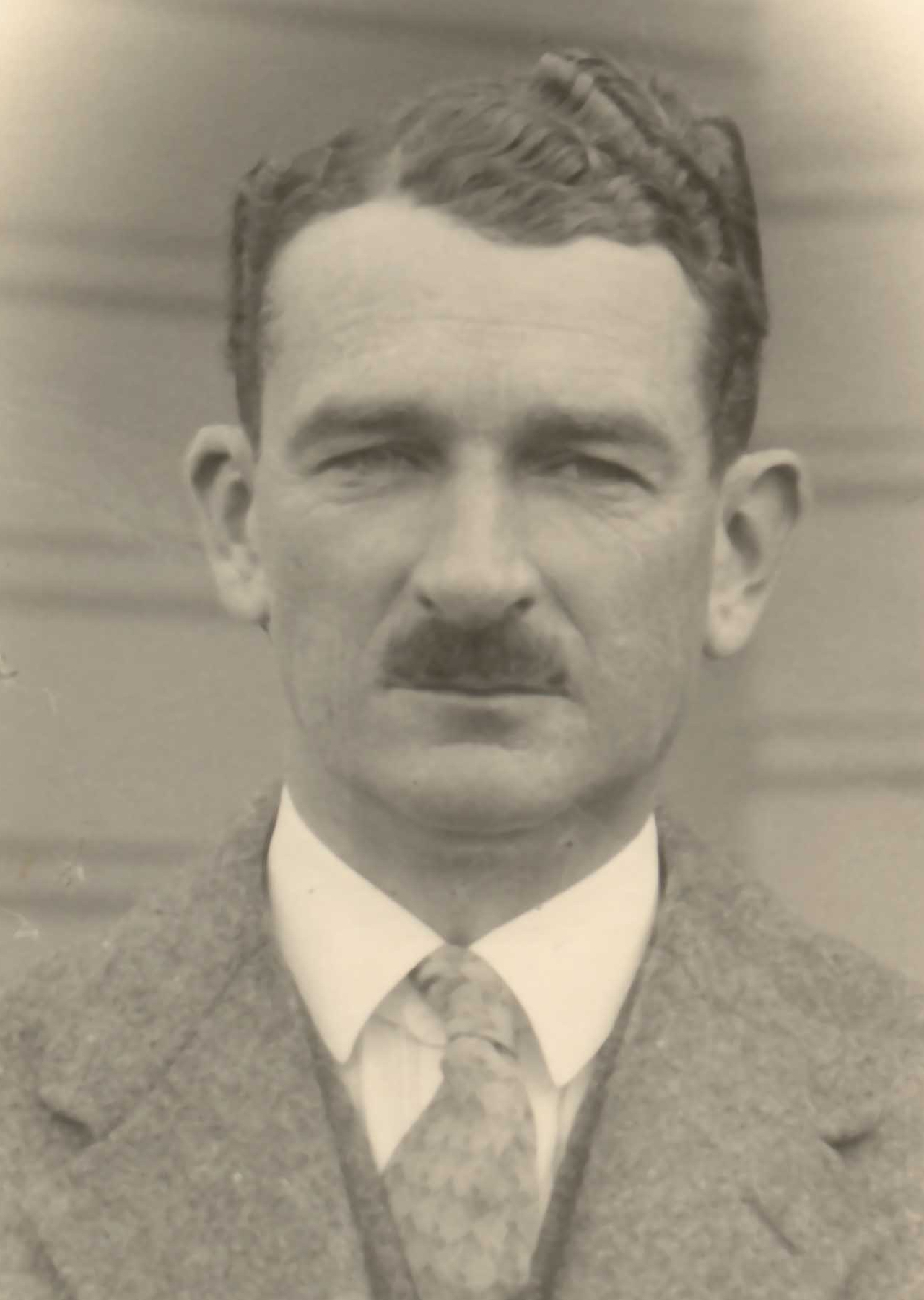
- Peren in 1929
- Born: 30 November 1892; Streatham, England
- Died: 19 July 1980 (aged 87); Palmerston North, New Zealand
- Military career
- Allegiance: New Zealand
- Branch: Canadian Army; British Army; New Zealand Military Forces
- Rank: Brigadier
- Commands: 2nd Infantry Brigade; 4th Division
- Conflicts: First World War; Western Front; Second World War
- Awards: Knight Commander of the Order of the British Empire; Mentioned in Despatches; Croix de guerre (France)

Brigadier Sir Geoffrey Sylvester Peren KBE (30 November 1892 – 19 July 1980) was an agricultural scientist, university professor, and agricultural college principal, as well as a soldier in the two world wars, serving in the Canadian, British, and New Zealand armies.

== Biography ==
Peren was born in Streatham, Surrey, England, on 30 November 1892. While still a teenager, he emigrated to Canada, working on farms and orchards in Ontario and British Columbia. He was subsequently awarded a scholarship to attend the Ontario Agricultural College.

After completing his studies, Peren worked in an orchard for a short time and then enlisted in the Canadian Expeditionary Force in March 1915. He was a sergeant in the ammunition column of the 4th Field Artillery Brigade, which was part of the 2nd Canadian Division. After arriving in England in May 1915, he applied for a transfer to the British Army, and was commissioned in the Royal Field Artillery. From late 1915, he served on the Western Front as an artillery officer in the 49th Field Artillery Brigade, which was part of the 14th (Light) Division, seeing service on the Somme and at Arras. He was later posted to the division's headquarters as an artillery staff officer. He received the French Croix de guerre with Star and was also mentioned in despatches for his service.

After his discharge in 1919, Peren secured a position at the East Malling Fruit Research Station, and then an inspector's role with the Ministry of Agriculture and Fisheries. In 1920, he was appointed to the University of Bristol as a lecturer in pomology (fruit research). Peren married in 1923, and the following year he was appointed Chair of Agriculture at Victoria University College (now Victoria University of Wellington). He left to be foundation principal of Massey Agricultural College (now Massey University) in 1927. During World War II he commanded the 2nd Brigade for part of 1941 and 1942, and the 4th Division for parts of 1942 and 1943 and eventually reached the rank of brigadier. Following the war he played a major role in the development of the Perendale breed of sheep and also continued to serve in various Army and defence roles.

In 1935, Peren was awarded the King George V Silver Jubilee Medal. In the 1953 New Year Honours, he was made a Commander of the Order of the British Empire, for services to agriculture, and later that year he was awarded the Queen Elizabeth II Coronation Medal. Six years later, in the 1959 New Year Honours, he was promoted to Knight Commander of the Order of the British Empire, for services to agriculture, especially as head of Massey Agricultural College.

Massey University named the main building on its Manawatū campus the Sir Geoffrey Peren Building in honour of Peren in 2010.

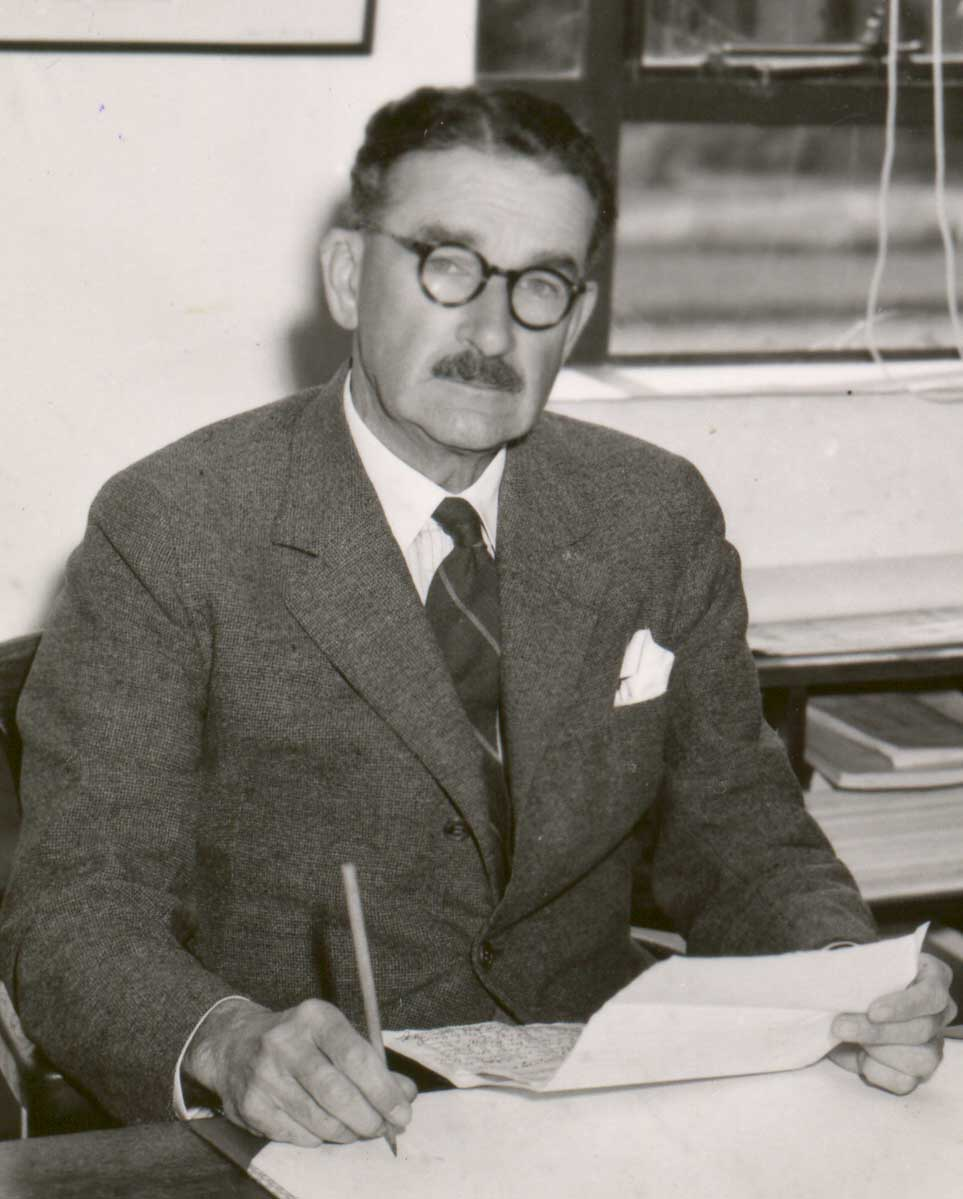
Peren, Principal of Massey Agricultural College, in his office in the 1940s/1950s
