= Sir Geoffrey Peren Building =

Building in Massey University, New Zealand

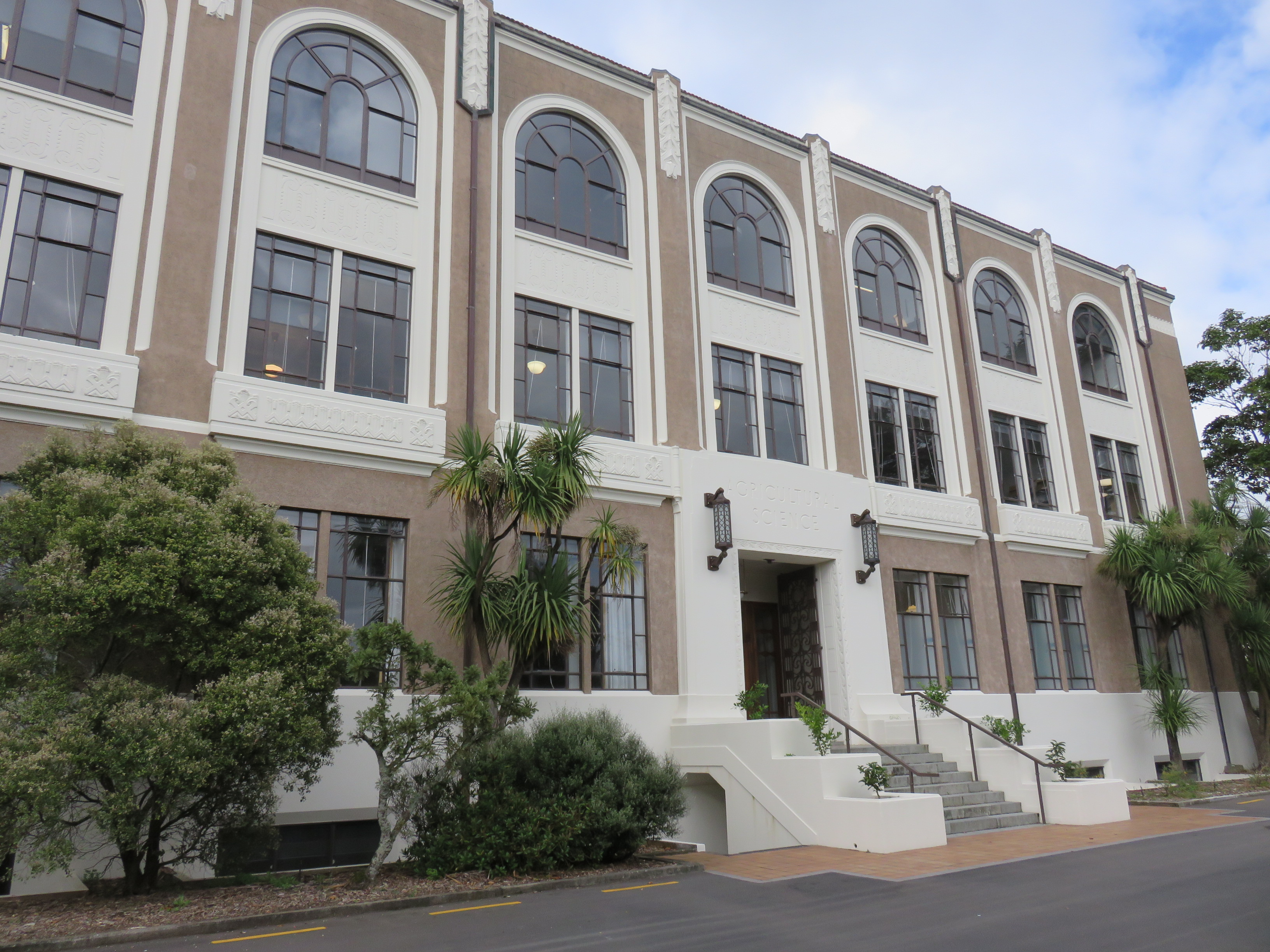
- Sir Geoffrey Peren Building in 2017
- Interactive map of the Sir Geoffrey Peren Building area
- Former names: Agricultural Science Building; Main Building; Old Main Building

General information
- Architectural style: Spanish Mission; Art Deco
- Location: Palmerston North, New Zealand
- Coordinates: 40.3840°S 175.6179°E
- Named for: Sir Geoffrey Peren
- Year built: 1929–1931
- Opened: April 1931, 31; 95 years ago
- Renovated: 2012–2015

Design and construction
- Architect: Roy Alstan Lippincott

Renovating team
- Awards and prizes: NZIA's Western Architecture Award for Heritage

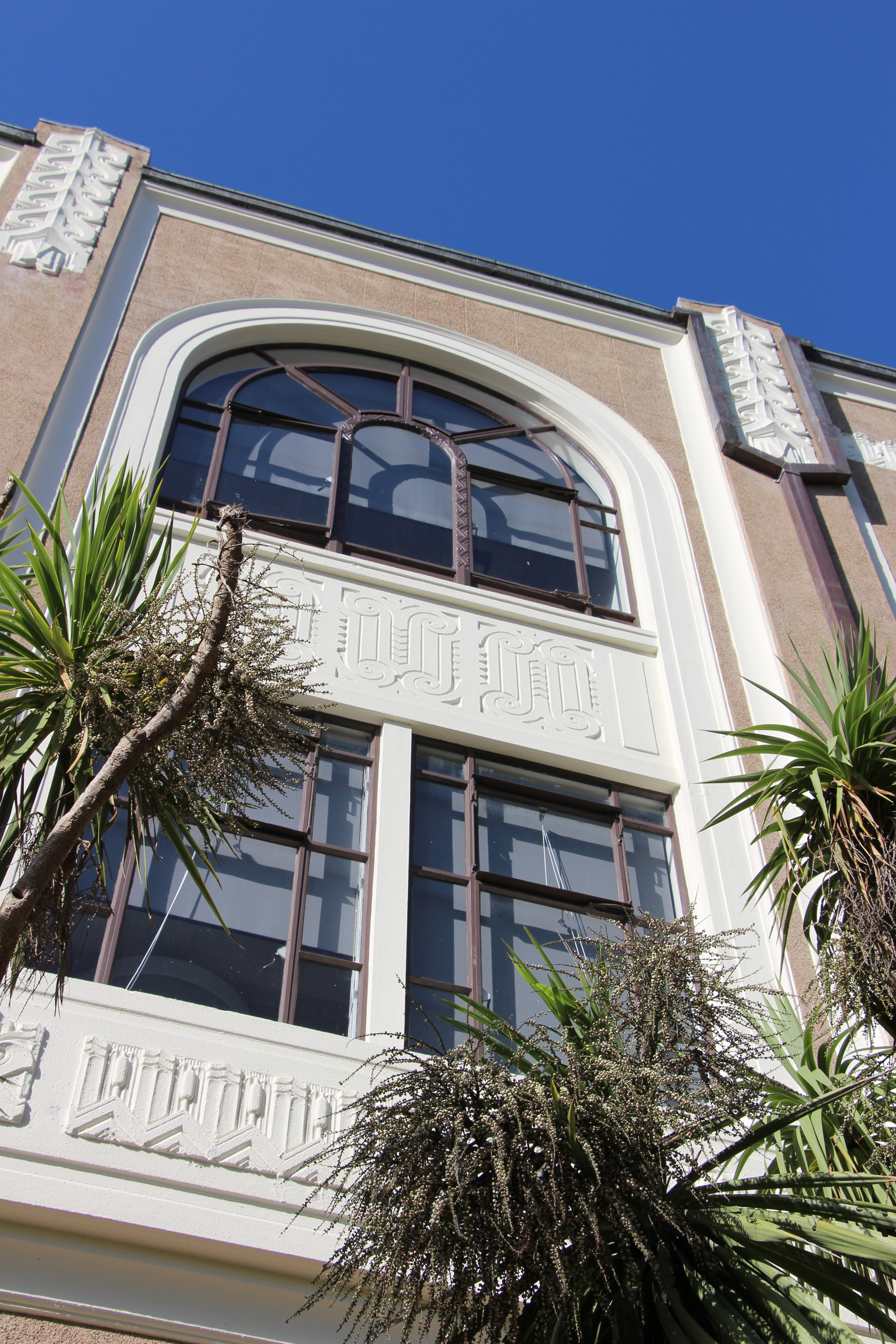
A close-up view of some of the motifs on the Sir Geoffrey Peren Building, 2016

Massey University's Sir Geoffrey Peren Building, or Old Main Building as it was previously known, is located on the Manawatū campus of the university.

At the time of its completion the building was known as the Agricultural Science Building, often shortened to Science Building. It was also referred to as the Main Building, and later as the Old Main Building. In 2010, it was renamed in honour of Sir Geoffrey Peren, the first principal of the university's forerunner, Massey Agricultural College.

== History ==
Constructed from 1929 to 1931, the building was designed to serve as the administration and teaching building of Massey Agricultural College by American architect Roy Alstan Lippincott, who had settled in Auckland. Lippincott was the brother-in-law of Walter Burley Griffin and had earlier been involved, along with Griffin, with the planning of Canberra.

On 4 December 1929 the foundation stone of the Science Building was laid by the Governor-General Sir Charles Fergusson. The official opening of the building by then Governor-General Lord Bledisloe, took place on 31 April 1931.

Designed primarily in the Spanish Mission style, the building contains a mix of features from several architectural styles. In addition to Art Deco features, the building is an early example in New Zealand of indigenous cultural and natural design elements being incorporated into modernist architecture - some design motifs mimic Māori carvings and natural elements such as plants and animals of New Zealand. The building was constructed of reinforced concrete and the roof was covered with red Marseilles tiles. It is protected as a 'Category I' historic place by Heritage New Zealand Pouhere Taonga.

For most of its history the building served as a teaching, research and administrative space for the college and later the university. During World War II its served for a few years as the New Zealand Army Staff College.

The initial layout of the building included offices for staff, lecture rooms, a library and twelve laboratories for agriculture and science. Since those early days, several modifications have been made to the building to suit the needs of its occupants. In 1962 the auditorium, which had a level floor, was converted into a lecture theater with a sloping floor. The laboratories and research spaces used by agriculture and science staff made way for seminar rooms and studies between 1978 and 1980 when humanities staff and the Centre for Extramural Studies moved in. A top story was also added then to the side wings.

From 2012 to 2015 the building underwent a major upgrade when it was refurbished and seismically strengthened. This refurbishment saw the building restored to its original condition and the project won the New Zealand Institute of Architects' Western Architecture Award for Heritage in 2016. Since this refurbishment, the building has been used by staff of the university's College of Humanities and Social Sciences.

In 2021 a process was started to award heritage status to the area encompassing the Sir Geoffrey Peren Building, the Refectory, McHardy Hall, the Old Registry Building, Tiritea House and the Oval. This area is now known as the Turitea Historic Area.
