= Turitea =

Suburb of Palmerston North, New Zealand

- Suburb
- Interactive map of Turitea
- Coordinates: 40.408°S 175.655°E
- Country: New Zealand
- City: Palmerston North
- Local authority: Palmerston North City Council
- Electoral ward: Te Hirawanui General Ward; Te Pūao Māori Ward

Area
  - Land: 2,358 ha (5,830 acres)

Population (2023 Census)
  - Total: 153
  - Density: 6.49/km^{2} (16.8/sq mi)

Turitea is a suburb of Palmerston North in the Manawatū-Whanganui region of New Zealand. It is located on the southern side of the Manawatū River, south of Massey University.

Turitea is the home to Palmerston North's water supply and location of a planned wind farm.

Most of Turitea is in the Fitzherbert Ward in the Palmerston North City Council, alongside the neighbouring suburbs of Aokautere and Linton.

Prior to 1996, Turitea was part of the Manawatu electorate. However, due to the reformation of the electoral system from FPP to MMP, the electorate of Palmerston North's boundaries were redrawn to include Turitea. In 2007, the boundaries were redrawn and Turitea was transferred to the Rangitikei electorate, thus making Palmerston North completely surrounded by Rangitikei.

== Demographics ==
Turitea locality covers 23.58 km^{2} (9.10 sq mi). It It is part of the larger Pihauatua statistical area.

Historical population
Year	Pop.	±% p.a.
2006	87	—
2013	84	−0.50%
2018	117	+6.85%
2023	153	+5.51%
The 2006 population is for a larger area of 24.30 km^{2}. Source:

Turitea had a population of 153 in the 2023 New Zealand census, an increase of 36 people (30.8%) since the 2018 census, and an increase of 69 people (82.1%) since the 2013 census. There were 75 males and 78 females in 48 dwellings. 2.0% of people identified as LGBTIQ+. The median age was 36.8 years (compared with 38.1 years nationally). There were 45 people (29.4%) aged under 15 years, 15 (9.8%) aged 15 to 29, 69 (45.1%) aged 30 to 64, and 21 (13.7%) aged 65 or older.

People could identify as more than one ethnicity. The results were 88.2% European (Pākehā); 7.8% Māori; 3.9% Asian; 3.9% Middle Eastern, Latin American and African New Zealanders (MELAA); and 7.8% other, which includes people giving their ethnicity as "New Zealander". English was spoken by 98.0%, Māori by 3.9%, and other languages by 13.7%. No language could be spoken by 3.9% (e.g. too young to talk). The percentage of people born overseas was 19.6, compared with 28.8% nationally.

Religious affiliations were 27.5% Christian, and 2.0% other religions. People who answered that they had no religion were 64.7%, and 5.9% of people did not answer the census question.

Of those at least 15 years old, 54 (50.0%) people had a bachelor's or higher degree, 48 (44.4%) had a post-high school certificate or diploma, and 3 (2.8%) people exclusively held high school qualifications. The median income was $60,100, compared with $41,500 nationally. 33 people (30.6%) earned over $100,000 compared to 12.1% nationally. The employment status of those at least 15 was 72 (66.7%) full-time and 12 (11.1%) part-time.

== Education ==
Turitea School is a co-educational state primary school for Year 1 to 6 students, with a roll of 122 as of March 2026. It opened in 1895.
