= Hollander =

Hollander is a surname, usually of Ashkenazi Jewish origin. "Hollander" is a Dutch term for people from the Netherlands, or specifically Holland proper. Variants of Germanic origin include Hollaender and Holländer.

People with the surname include:

- Alexander Hollaender, American radiation biologist
- Anne Hollander (1930–2014), American fashion historian, writer, critic and reviewer
- Anthony Hollander (born c. 1960), British academic
- Audrey Hollander (born 1979), American pornographic actress
- Christian Hollander (c. 1510–15 – 1589), Dutch composer
- Bernard Hollander (1864–1934), London psychiatrist
- David Hollander (born 1968), American television writer, producer and director
- Edith Frank (1900–1945), née Holländer, mother of diarist Anne Frank
- Edmund Hollander (born 1954), American landscape architect and educator
- Felix Hollaender (1867–1931), German writer
- Friedrich Hollaender (1896–1976), German composer
- Gustav Hollaender (1855–1915), German composer
- Han Hollander (1886–1943), Dutch journalist
- Jacob Hollander (1871–1940), American economist and historian of economic thought
- John Hollander (1929–2013), American poet, critic and English professor
- Karl Holländer or Hollander (1868–?), German chess master
- Lorin Hollander (born 1944), American classical concert pianist
- Matthias Holländer (born 1954), German painter
- Myles Hollander (1941–2025), American academic statistician
- Nancy Hollander (born 1944), American criminal defense lawyer
- Neil Hollander (1939–2021), American filmmaker and writer
- Nicole Hollander (born 1939), American cartoonist, author of the syndicated comic strip Sylvia
- Paul Hollander (1932–2019), Hungarian-born American political sociologist, communist-studies scholar and non-fiction author
- Robert Hollander (1933–2021), American academic and translator
- Sam Hollander, American songwriter
- Samuel Hollander (born 1937), British/Canadian/Israeli economist
- Sean Hollander (born 2000), American luger
- Tom Hollander (born 1967), British actor
- Walther von Hollander (1892–1973), German writer
- Xaviera Hollander (born 1943), Dutch call girl, madam, and writer
- Ya'akov Hollaender (1928–2014) Israeli composer, music arranger and conductor
- Zander Hollander (1923–2014), American sports writer, journalist, editor and archivist

== See also ==
- Den Hollander, a surname
