= Den Hollander =

Den Hollander or Denhollander is a surname. Notable people with the surname include:

- Frank den Hollander (born 1956), Dutch mathematician
- Jane den Hollander, Australian academic administrator
- Jazmyne Denhollander (born 1994), Canadian slalom canoeist
- Rachael Denhollander (born 1984), American lawyer and gymnast
- Renate den Hollander (born 1977), Dutch politician
- Roy Den Hollander (1948–2020), American lawyer and men's right activist
- Stien den Hollander

== See also ==
- Hollander
