= History of rugby union in New Zealand =

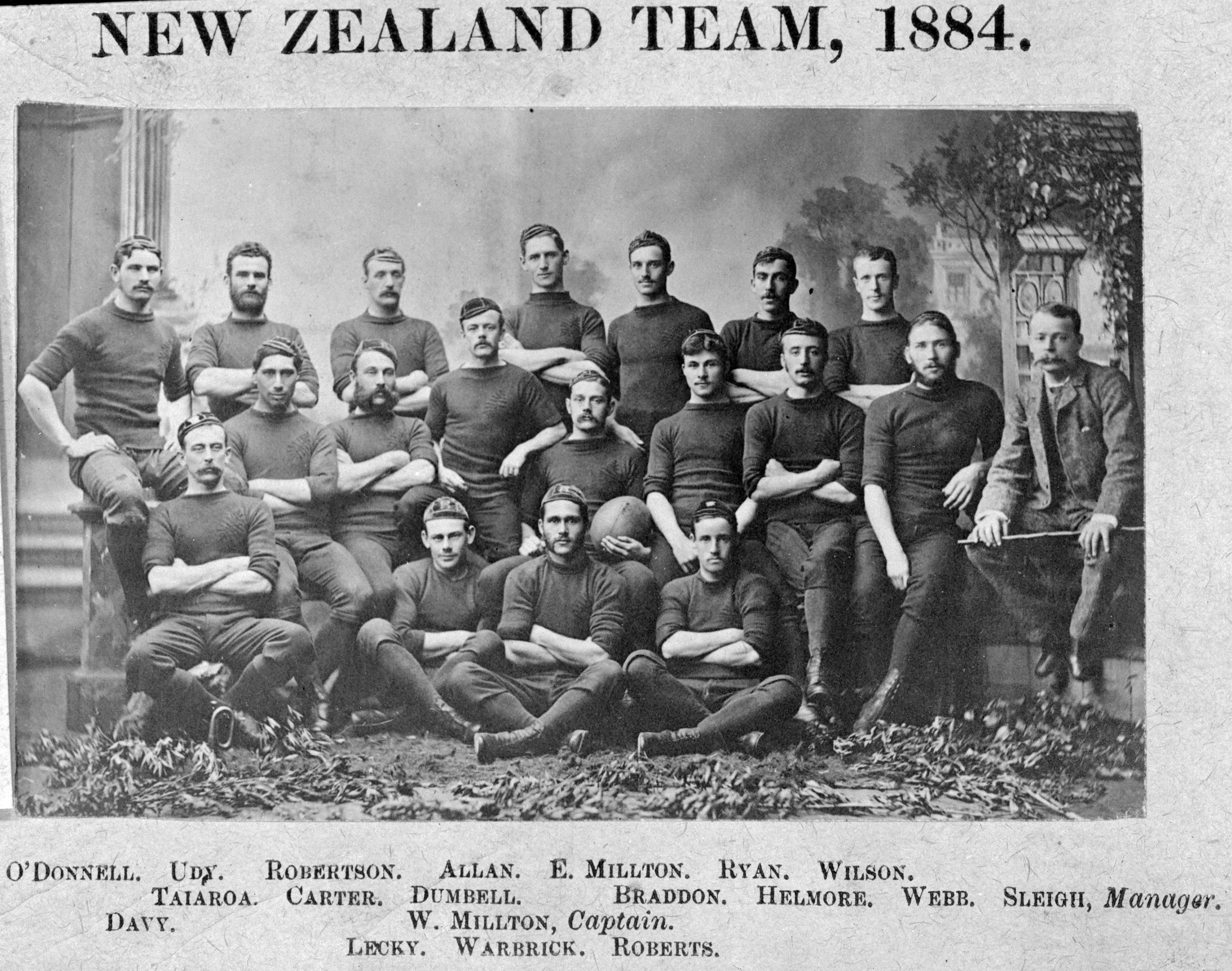
The 1884 team that toured New South Wales, Australia.

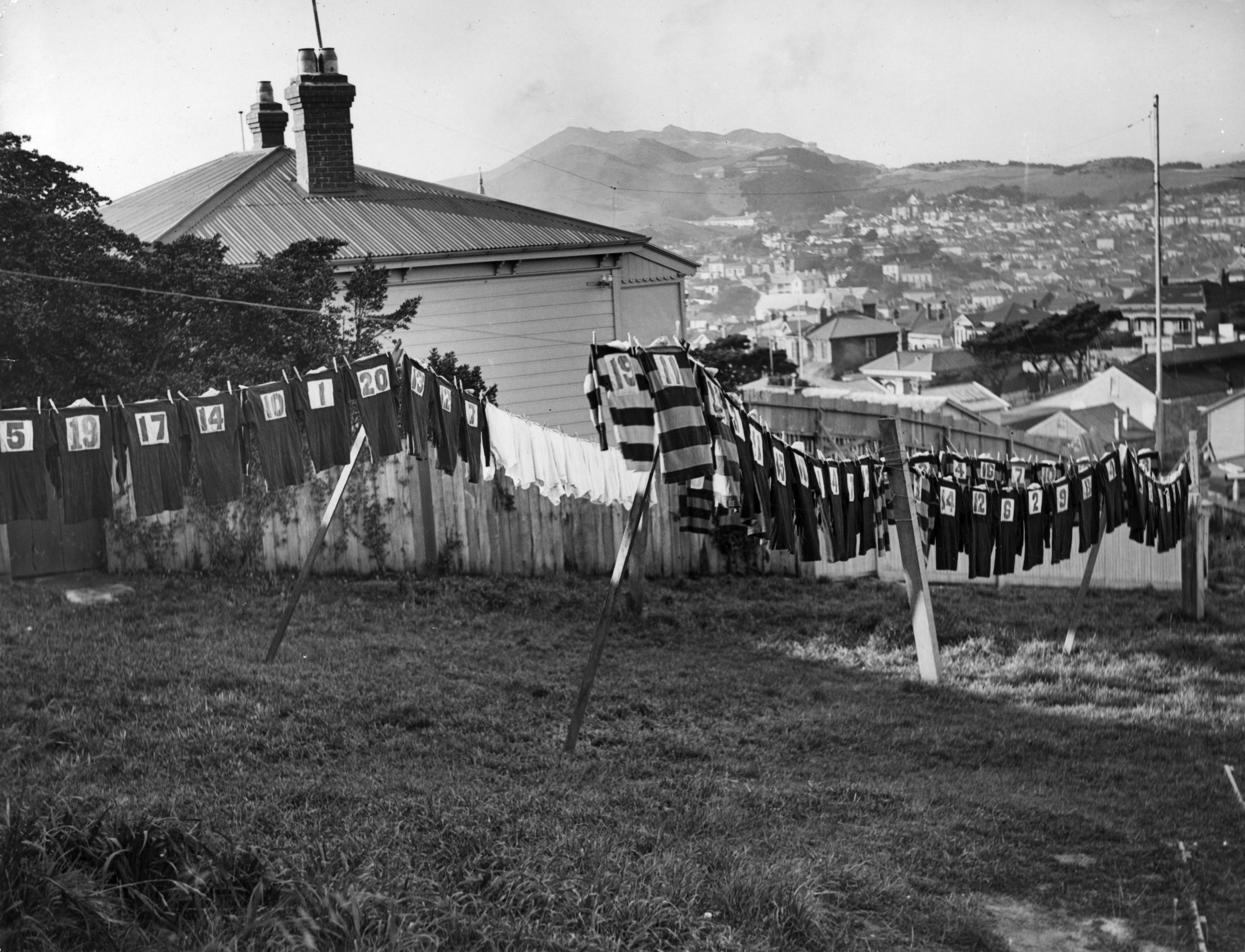
Rugby jerseys drying, Wellington c. 1930s

Rugby union has a long history in New Zealand. Today, New Zealand holds tier one status with World Rugby.

== Early history and 19th century ==
=== Pre-Codification Football ===
Before Europeans arrived in New Zealand, the Māori were playing a ball game called Kī-o-rahi which greatly resembled Australian Rules Football and rugby football. It has been suggested that this may have influenced New Zealand playing styles, especially amongst the indigenous population.

Various codes of football were played in New Zealand in the years following white settlement. Christchurch Football Club, which is now the oldest rugby club in the country, was founded in 1863. It played by its own rules for many years.

=== Early rugby football ===
Rugby football was first introduced to New Zealand in 1870 by Charles John Monro, son of the then-Speaker of the House of Representatives, David Monro. He encountered the game while studying at Christ's College Finchley, in East Finchley, London, England, and on his return introduced the game to Nelson College, who played the first rugby union match against Nelson football club on 14 May. A visit to Wellington by Munro later that same year resulted in an organised match between Nelson and Wellington. By the following year, the game had been formalised in Wellington, and subsequently rugby was taken up in Wanganui and Auckland in 1873 and Hamilton in 1874. In 1875, the first representative team was formed, being a combined-clubs Auckland team which toured the South. It is thought that by the mid-1870s, the game had been taken up by the majority of the colony.

The latter stages of the 1870s saw the emergence of a more formal structure, with Unions being formed in both Canterbury and Wellington during 1879. In 1882, the first international rugby side toured New Zealand, a New South Wales side that visited both islands during the latter part of the year. Two years later, a New Zealand team visited New South Wales, wearing blue jerseys with a golden fern. The team won all their games. In 1888, the first ever British Isles rugby team tour took place, visiting New Zealand and Australia. The visitors won all their New Zealand games except for one, losing to Auckland. During 1888-89, the New Zealand Native team became the first from a colony to visit Britain. In 1892 the New Zealand Rugby Football Union (NZRFU) was established, to act as the national governing body of the sport. Following the establishment of the national governing body, the first NZRFU national sanctioned tour was undertaken in 1893, when a ten-game tour of Australia was played. The team was captained by Thomas Ellison.

== Twentieth century ==
=== Arrival of Rugby League ===
In 1905, as New Zealand's rugby union team, the All Blacks, toured Britain, they witnessed first-hand Northern Union games. In 1906, All Black George William Smith, while on his way home, met an Australian entrepreneur, James J. Giltinan to discuss the potential of professional rugby in Australasia.

In the meantime, a less-well known New Zealand rugby union player, Albert Henry Baskerville (or Baskiville), was about to recruit a group of players for a professional tour of Great Britain. It is believed that Baskerville first became aware of the profits to be made from such a venture while he was working at the Wellington Post Office in 1906: a colleague had a coughing fit and dropped a British newspaper. Baskerville picked it up and noticed a report about a Northern Union match that over 40,000 people had attended. Baskerville wrote to the NRFU asking if they would host a New Zealand touring party. George Smith learned of Baskerville's activities and they joined forces to recruit a team.

A rugby league team, the All Golds was set up, named facetiously after the players' payment. When the All Golds stopped off in Australia, three games were played at the Sydney Showground, against a professional NSW rugby team. These games were played under rugby union laws, as no copies of the Northern Union laws were available. Baskerville was greatly impressed by Dally Messenger, and persuaded him to join the touring party. For this reason, the All Golds are sometimes known as Australasia, rather than New Zealand. Although Messenger was the only Australian in the touring team. The All Golds arrived in Britain late in 1907 having never even seen a match played under the new Northern Union laws.

=== The Originals ===
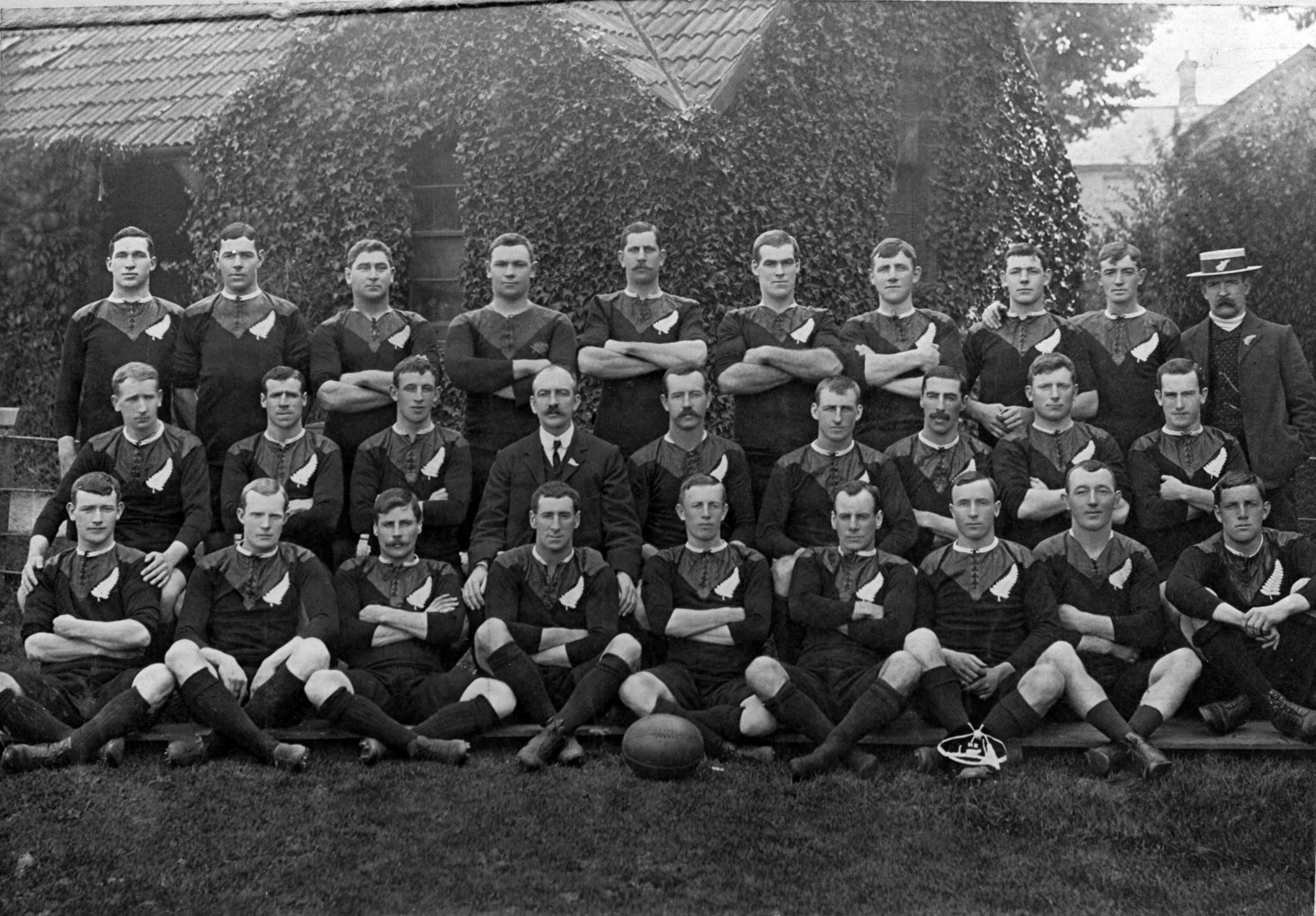
The 1905 All Blacks, named The Originals.

In 1902, the governor of New Zealand, the fifth Earl of Ranfurly presented a trophy shield to the Auckland side, who were undefeated in provincial competition that year. The shield became known as the Ranfurly Shield. Three years later, a 1905 New Zealand team, who became known as the "Originals", toured the British Isles and France winning all of their games apart from losing the test against Wales. As the team swept through Britain, some of the players took note of how rugby (league) was being played in the North of England. One player, Aucklander George Smith met with Sydney entrepreneur James J. Giltinan on his way home, and discussed the opportunities of such a game. Meanwhile, New Zealander Albert Henry Baskervill had contacted the Northern Union to arrange a New Zealand tour, as he had just read about the game in the Wellington Post. The NZRU discouraged any involvement from its players and officials, nonetheless, a team departed a travelled to Sydney first, and were there labelled the All Golds, a play on All Blacks in reference to the player payments. The team went on to tour England. They played an import role in rugby league.

=== 1930s ===
The 1930s saw a period of skill development for rugby in New Zealand. The 1940 All Black tour of South Africa was one of the first sporting events cancelled due to the Second World War. Rugby was however played in services sport, with games being played with South African allies during the North African desert campaign, also, most domestic competitions were suspended during this time. In 1976, the first ever season of the National Provincial Championship (succeeded in 2006 by the Air New Zealand Cup and Heartland Championship) went underway. In its inaugural format, Division One was made up of seven North Island teams and four South Island. The remaining provinces contested a split second division, though South and North teams did not meet each other, instead played their respective Island clubs. There was a separate relegation system in place for each the North and South, ensuring the number of teams from each island.

=== 1980s to present ===
The 1981 Springbok Tour, or The Tour, went down as one of the most controversial rugby tours ever. From July to September, the Springboks toured New Zealand. Rugby fans filled the stadiums, yet equal numbers of fans protested the games outside the stadiums. Police were divided into Red and Blue riot squads for the tour, and in preparation for possible trouble, all spectators were told to assemble in sports grounds at least an hour before kickoff. At a game at Rugby Park in Hamilton, around 350 protesters pulled down a fence and invaded the pitch. Police, already very worried, pulled the match when they found out a light plane piloted by a protester was headed to fly around the stadium. A protest turned violent in Wellington the following week, escalating the situation. During the final test match at Eden Park, a low flying plane dropped flour bombs over the pitch. These images were beamed around the world, and looked as though a civil crisis had engulfed New Zealand. A subsequent 1985 All Black tour was prevented by the High Court, but an unofficial tour took place the following year.

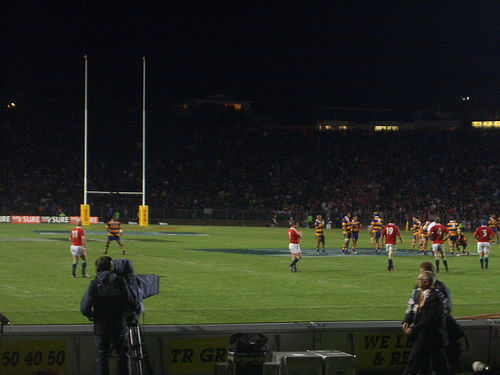
The 2005 British & Irish Lions tour to New Zealand.

In 1987, the NZRFU wrote to the International Rugby Football Board, now known as the International Rugby Board (IRB), requesting the possibility of hosting an inaugural Rugby World Cup. The 1987 World Cup was eventually given to both New Zealand and Australia. The All Blacks made it to the final, where they would meet France. The All Blacks won and were crowned the first ever World Champions. In the 1980s, New Zealand provincial sides participated in the South Pacific Championship, along with teams from Australia and Fiji. In 1992 this type of competition was relaunched as the Super Sixes, and was expanded to the Super 10 later. As rugby entered the professional era in the mid-1990s, along with South Africa and Australia, New Zealand formed SANZAR, which would see them start a trans-national competition, known as the Super 12. The 1996 Super 12 season saw the Auckland Blues finished as champions, whilst the Waikato Chiefs 6th, the Otago Highlanders 8th, the Wellington Hurricanes 9th, and the Canterbury Crusaders 12th. The SANZAR agreement also saw the formation of the Tri Nations Series, a contest between the respective national sides, the All Blacks, Springboks and Wallabies. The All Blacks won the first series. Beginning in 2012 the series will be Joined with the Argentina Pumas to create The Rugby Championship. New Zealand was supposed to jointly host the 2003 World Cup with Australia, but a disagreement with the IRB saw the tournament given to Australia in its entirety. In 2006, New Zealand won the right to host the 2011 World Cup.

==== South Africa tour of 1981 ====
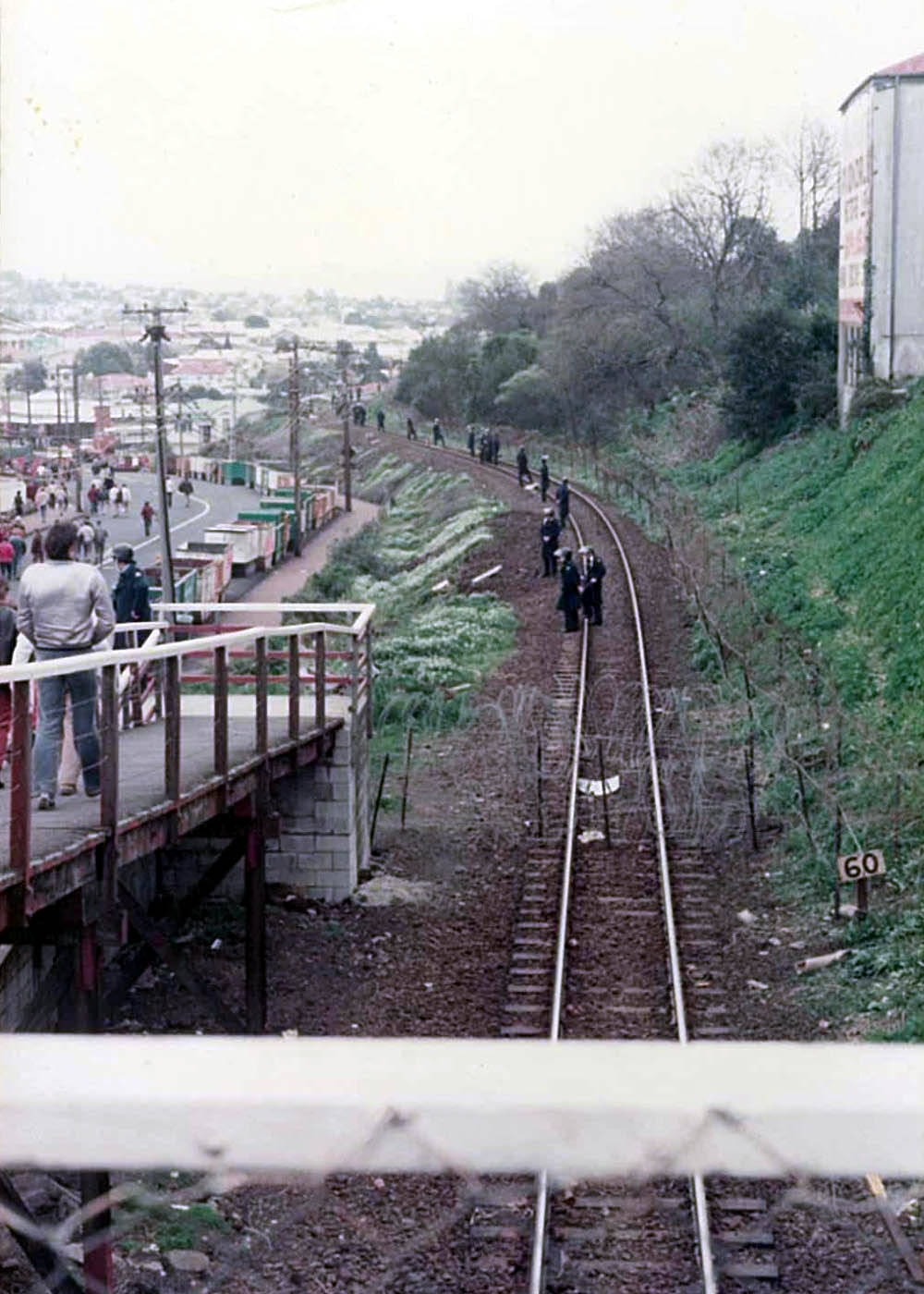
Police officers guarding a barbed wire perimeter around Eden Park near Kingsland railway station in New Zealand.

The 1981 Springboks tour of New Zealand was compromised by demonstrations, and the tourists had to be kept under strict security throughout their visit.

Two games had to be cancelled. The game at Hamilton in the first week of the tour saw 200 protestors rip down a chain fence, sprinkle tacks all over the pitch and then staged a sit-in on the half way line. At the time, a crowd of 25,000 was watching them playing Waikato. Subsequent matches saw the arrival of barbed wire, and police with batons. The match against South Canterbury at Timaru was cancelled because the authorities thought that they would not be able to control the demonstrations there.

The final test of the tour was buzzed by a Cessna aircraft - some in fact nicknamed it the "Crazy Biggles Test". The plane continually strafed the pitch, and dropped flour bombs, flares and leaflets. All-Black prop Gary Knight was temporarily stunned by a flour bomb.

Musician Bruce Russell received two police convictions as a student leader of protests against the tour. He was at the University of Otago at the time.

It was a tight game, with Allan Hewson, the New Zealand full-back kicking a long range penalty to win the game 25-22. As Rod Chester and Nev McMillan described the scene:

"There will probably never be another Test match like this. The tension generated by the closeness and importance of the game, combined with the efforts of the protestors inside, outside and above the ground, made for an exhilarating and yet terrifying afternoon."

The NZRFU constitution contained much high-minded wording about promoting the image of rugby and New Zealand, and generally being a benefit to society. In 1985 the NZRFU proposed an All Black tour of South Africa. Two lawyers successfully sued it, claiming such a tour would breach its constitution. The High Court stopped the tour.

The role of the NZ police also became more controversial as a result of the tour.

A planned All Black tour to South Africa in 1985 remobilised the New Zealand protesters and it was cancelled.

== Māori and apartheid ==
New Zealand has a long history of sporting contact with South Africa, especially through rugby union. Until the 1970s this resulted in discrimination against Māori players, since the apartheid political system in South Africa for most of the twentieth century did not allow people of different races to play sport together, and therefore South African officials requested that Māori players not be included in sides which toured their country. Despite some of New Zealand's best players being Māori, this was agreed to, and Māori were excluded from tours of South Africa. Some Māori always objected to this, but it did not become a major issue until 1960, when there were several public protests at Māori exclusion from that year's tour. The protest group Halt All Racist Tours was formed in 1969. Although this was an issue in which Māori were central, and Māori were involved in the protests, the anti-tour movement was dominated by Pākehā (white New Zealanders).

In 1970 the South African government relented and allowed a mixed race (All Black) team to tour South Africa, though Maori players traveled as "honorary whites". In 1973 a proposed Springbok (South African rugby team) tour of New Zealand was cancelled. In 1976 the South African government again relented and allowed a mixed-race All Black team to tour South Africa. However, by this time international opinion had turned against any sporting contact with South Africa, and New Zealand faced significant international pressure to cut ties. Despite this, in 1981 the Springboks toured New Zealand, sparking mass protests and civil disobedience. Although Pākehā continued to dominate the movement, Māori were prominent within it, and in Auckland formed the patu squad in order to remain autonomous within the wider movement.

During and after the Tour, many Māori protesters questioned Pākehā protesters' commitment to racial equality, accusing them of focussing on racism in other countries while ignoring it within New Zealand. The majority of Pākehā protesters were not heavily involved in protest after the Tour ended, but a significant minority, including several anti-Tour groups, turned their attention to New Zealand race issues, particularly Pākehā prejudice and the Treaty of Waitangi.
