= Christ's College, Finchley =

Christ's College Finchley

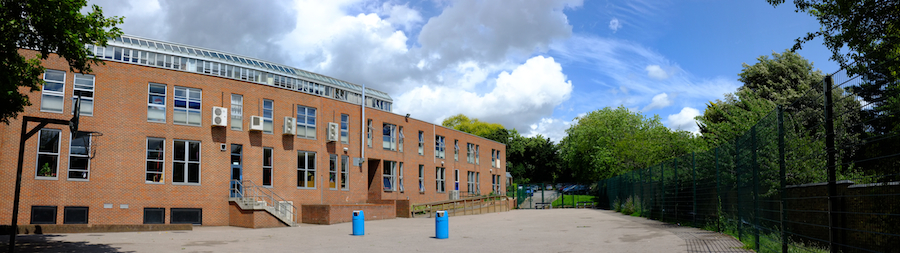

Location
- East End Road; London, N2 0SE; UK; 51.591°N 0.187°W

Information
- Type: Academy
- Established: 1857; 169 years ago
- Department for Education URN: 137388 Tables
- Ofsted: Reports
- Headteacher: Ruth Hill
- Gender: Boys and girls and others
- Age: 11 to 18
- Enrolment: 860
- Website: http://www.ccfplus.com/school/

Christ's College is a secondary school with academy status in East Finchley, London, United Kingdom. It falls under the London Borough of Barnet Local Education Authority for admissions. Since September 2018, Christ’s College Finchley has offered education to both girls and boys joining Year 7. The school presently has 860 pupils and specialises in Maths and Sciences.

== History ==
The history of the contemporary Christ’s College has its roots in two different schools:

- Chapel Street School, founded by Rev Watson in 1842, later named Alder School
- Finchley Hall School, founded by Rev Thomas Reader White in 1857, later named Christ’s College.

Alder School Badge, the tree is an Alder Tree, but the hunting horns are taken from Borough of Finchley's coat of arms

=== Alder School, Long Lane ===
A British School in Chapel Street, East Finchley was opened by local Congregationalists in 1842, but in 1876 fire destroyed the original building, and the new building became Finchley’s first Board School in 1881. East Finchley grew rapidly in the 1880s, and the Finchley School Board decided to build a new building in Long Lane which was opened in 1884, with the staff and pupils moving to the new premises at the end of that year.

In 1931, the school opened a secondary wing and was renamed Alder School, after a chairman of Finchley’s Education committee. It was organised into three school houses, Rangers, Archers, and Foresters. In 1944 it became a mixed Secondary Modern school, and an all-boys school in 1958. It was organised into four school houses, Rangers (Yellow), Archers (Red), Foresters (Green), & Rovers (Blue).

The school was seen as providing a necessary education for skilled workers in the light engineering works of Finchley, such as Simms Motor Units, Hendon and Barnet, and was well thought of. It was also host to Bob Cobbing, the Concrete Sound poet and Jeff Nuttall author of the best seller, 'Bomb Culture' during the 1960s. It was merged with Christ's College in 1978, and the buildings at Long Lane were demolished.

=== Christ's College, Hendon Lane ===
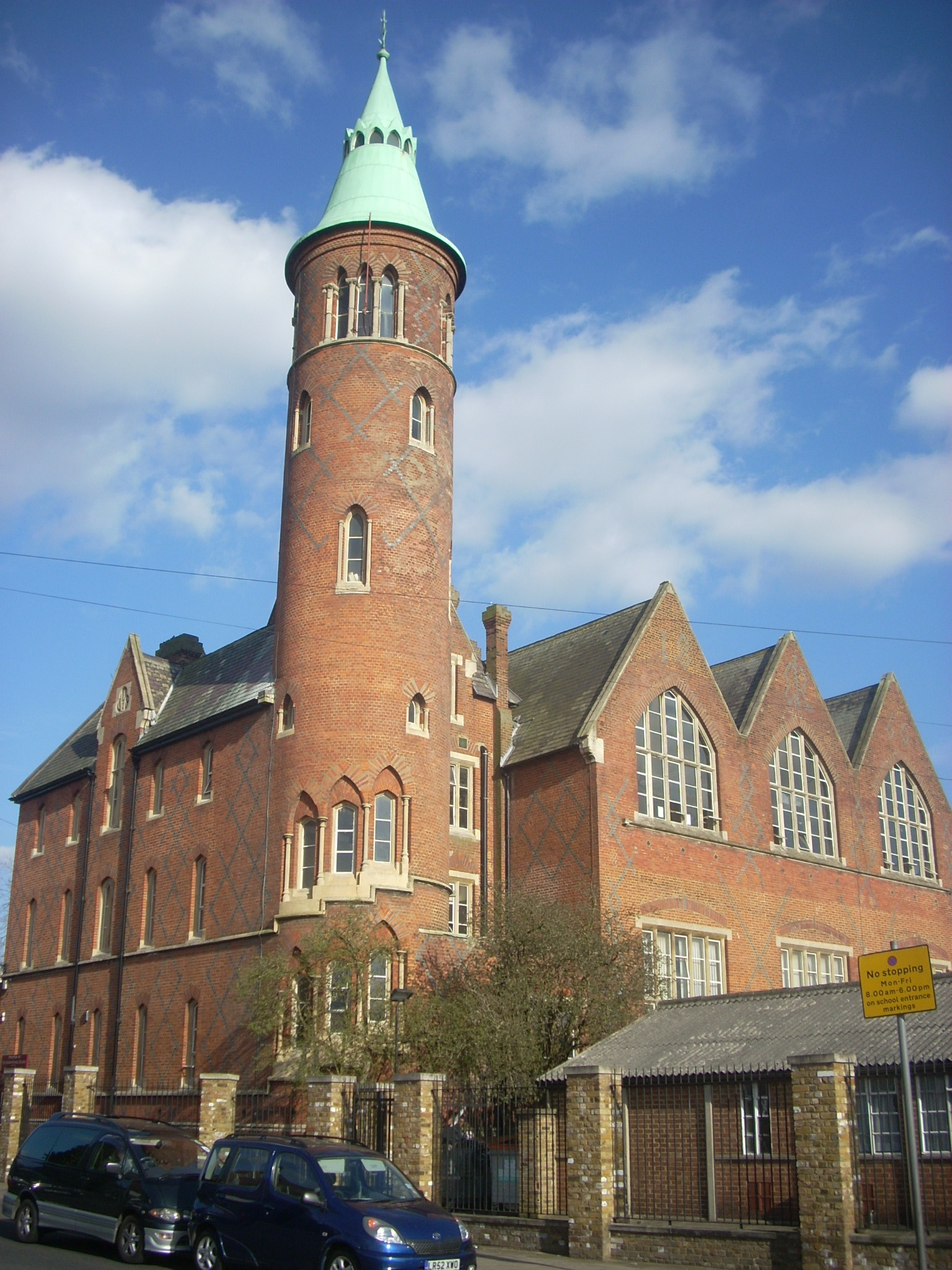
The former Christ’s College building on Hendon Lane

In 1857 the Rev Thomas Reader White, Rector of St Mary’s Finchley, opened Finchley Hall School, in Hendon Lane (next to the church, on the site of what used to be Church End Library) in what had been a local inn, the Queen's Head. The following year he had the stable block and the village "cage" removed and a new school built, to designs by Anthony Salvin. The school was an Anglican School, intended to provide a public school education at a reasonable rate.

The school became popular, and a new building was constructed across the road in 1860, with money provided by White's brother who was a rich London merchant, and it was renamed Christ's College. The designs were by the architect Edward Roberts, and its main feature was a 120-foot-tall (37-metre) tower, a local landmark. The school flourished as a private school during the 1860s and 1870s, when its Headmaster was the Rev T C Whitehead. It was under Whitehead that the school was first divided into four houses: North, South, East, and West.

With the loss of its founder, then the self-styled Warden, to a disorder of the brain in 1877, the school went into decline. In 1902, the school was taken over by Middlesex County Council, as the first Middlesex County grammar school, but under John Tindal Phillipson, headmaster since 1895, attempts that were made to rename the school and change its character were resisted, and on the whole the transition was a smooth one. A rifle club was formed in 1904, which soon became a cadet corps. Until 1906 the school playing fields were directly behind St Mary’s church, but in 1906 new fields were acquired further down the hill, near to Dollis Brook.

In 1927, the school increased in size with new buildings, and ceased to be an Anglican institution. In 1972, a new annexe for design and technology was built on land in East Finchley. As a county grammar the school had a strong academic reputation, particularly in the sciences, with many pupils continuing their education at Oxford and Cambridge universities. In 1990 the Hendon Lane (Upper School) site was closed and the school moved in its entirety to the East Finchley site. For some time the building was unused and it was proposed as a venue for an arts centre, but eventually it was sold to a Jewish school (Pardes House Grammar School).

=== Christ's College, East End Road ===
With the foundation of the present school in 1978, the school was split into Upper school, which used the Hendon Lane site, and the Lower. The whole school moved to the new site in 1991, under the Headmastership of Brian Fletcher. In 2002, the then Headmaster Paul O'Shea expanded the sixth form, with the first intake of girls.

Christ's College has become a specialist Mathematics and Computing College, which means the school receives additional funds for investment in its Mathematics and Computing departments. The school's current headmaster is Dr Ruth Hill, who succeeded Mr Samson Olusanya.

== Motto and badge ==
The school badge since 1906 has been a combination of the three notched swords of the traditional county of Middlesex and a finch over an oak tree, the old unofficial arms of the Urban District of Finchley. The motto adopted in 1905 is Usque Proficiens meaning "Advance all the way".

== Combined Cadet Force ==
The first instance of cadet activity at Christ's College was in 1864, when a Cadet Corps attached to the 14th (Highgate) Middlesex Rifle Volunteer Corps was formed at the school. This was disbanded in 1867, and few records remain.

The present Cadet Unit was founded in 1904 with the formation of a Rifle Club. Although mainly a rifle club, its members carried military ranks and took part in regular training days. The transformation to a true Cadet Unit took place in 1911 when No.2 Company, 1st Cadet Battalion, The Middlesex Regiment (as it was officially called) was started at the school. In 1938 the unit was temporarily badged Royal Artillery as 'C' (Cadet) Battery of the 61st (Finsbury) Anti-aircraft Brigade. By 1942 the Unit had rejoined the 1st Cadet Battalion wearing the badges of the Middlesex Regiment. When the 1st Cadet Battalion was disbanded in 1948, The Unit became Christ's College Contingent, Combined Cadet Force, a self-administering unit, which it remains today.

In 1952, the Unit was presented with its own Colours, in memory of those members of the Contingent who fell in battle during the Second World War. The school's Combined Cadet Force (CCF) is among the tiny handful in the country to carry colours. The last major change was in 1969 when the affiliation to the Middlesex Regiment ceased and permission was given for the Contingent to wear the badges of the Parachute Regiment. From July 2021, The unit has become Coldstream Guards.

== Rugby union ==
The school has made contributions to the sport of rugby union. The scrum cap was invented at the school and first worn by the school's 1st XV. Three alumni went on to make notable contributions to the sport:

- C. J. Monro (at Christ’s College 1867–69), introduced rugby to New Zealand
- R. W. Shepstone Giddy (at Christ’s College 1871–74) and later Solicitor General, Cape Colony, was one of the men who introduced rugby to South Africa
- W. P. Carpmael, who was at the school from 1876 to 1883, founded the Barbarian Football Club, the team that by tradition plays the last match in a tour of the UK by Australia, New Zealand or South Africa.

== Notable former pupils ==
- David Bernstein, FA Chairman
- Peter Bonnington, British Formula One engineer. He is currently the senior race engineer for Lewis Hamilton at Mercedes-Benz in Formula One from 1986-1994
- Sir Arnold Burgen, President of the International Union of Basic and Clinical Pharmacology 1972-5 and of Academia Europaea from 1988–94
- Leslie Burgin, Liberal MP for Luton from 1929–31
- Richard Desmond, Publisher and proprietor of the Daily Express
- Frank "Lofty" England, Jaguar Cars' Le Mans-winning team manager and later company CEO
- Nick Fudge, painter, sculptor, and digital artist
- Harvey Goldsmith, Entertainment promoter
- Sir Demis Hassabis Computer game designer, artificial intelligence programmer, neuroscientist, world-class games player and Nobel Prize winner
- Izrael Hieger Biochemist who discovered the first known organic carcinogenic compound
- Professor Anthony Hollander, Head of the Institute of Integrative Biology, University of Liverpool from 2014 to present
- Stanley Kalms, Baron Kalms
- Sir John Kingman, Vice-Chancellor of the University of Bristol from 1985–2001
- Sir Peter Lachmann, Sheila Joan Smith Professor of Immunology at the University of Cambridge from 1977–99
- Roger Lyons, General Secretary of Amicus from 2002-4, and of MSF from 1992–2002
- Louis Marks, television screenwriter and producer
- Parry Mitchell, Baron Mitchell
- Stanley Mitchell, UK academic and Russian scholar
- Edward Warner Moeran, Labour MP for South Bedfordshire from 1950-1
- Charles John Monro, introduced Rugby Union to New Zealand
- Ray Park, actor
- David Pentecost, composer, writer, retired I.T. specialist
- John Quinton GC, RAF navigator, gave his life to save a young cadet.
- Steve Richards, political correspondent and GMTV presenter
- Charles Saatchi, advertising executive and art collector
- Daniel Sabbagh, Associate Editor at The Guardian newspaper
- Sir Jonathan Henry Sacks, Baron Sacks, Chief Rabbi of Great Britain
- Will Self, novelist, journalist, broadcaster
- Jon Sopel, BBC journalist and former presenter of The Politics Show
- Michael Stern, Conservative MP for Bristol North West
- Sir Peter Strawson, philosopher
- Alfred Wilkins, cricketer
- Sir William Tritton, co-invented the tank
- Eric Williams, writer
- R. K. 'Bobby' Wilson, British tennis icon, four times Wimbledon quarter finalist
- David Young, Baron Young of Graffham
- Prof Graham Zellick, CBE, QC, Vice-Chancellor, University of London 1997-2003
