= Piera McArthur =

New Zealand artist (1929–2025)

Piera McArthur ONZM
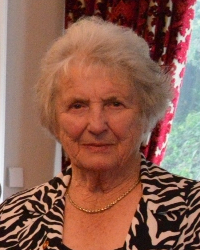
- McArthur in 2013
- Born: Sylvia Margarite Piera Monro; 1929; Ramsgate, Kent, England
- Died: 23 October 2025 (aged 96); Wellington, New Zealand
- Education: Victoria University College
- Spouse: John G. McArthur (died 2005)
- Relatives: Charles Monro (grandfather)
- Website: www.pieramcarthur.com

Sylvia Margarite Piera McArthur ONZM (née Monro; 1929 – 23 October 2025) was a New Zealand painter. In December 2011, she was appointed an Officer of the New Zealand Order of Merit, for services to the arts.

== Early life and education ==
McArthur was born in Ramsgate, Kent, England, in 1929. She was one of five children, and her father was a Fellow of the Royal College of Surgeons in Edinburgh, and from a "well-known medical dynasty", the Munros of Auchinbowie. The family moved to New Zealand in 1938, settling in Feilding. McArthur was educated at Feilding Convent School and then the Convent of the Sacred Heart, Island Bay, in Wellington, where she won the Society of the Sacred Heart's international prize for excellence, the St Madeleine Sophie award. She earned a scholarship to Victoria University College, where she graduated with a Master of Arts degree with first-class honours in modern languages in 1953.

== Career ==
McArthur married diplomat John G. McArthur, who she had met as a student. Their first posting was to Paris. The McArthurs had recently established New Zealand's first embassy in Chile when the 1973 Chilean coup d'état occurred. A wanted "prominent trade unionist", Luis Figueroa, broke into the embassy seeking asylum, and John McArthur smuggled him to the residence in the back of his car. Figueroa was joined by his girlfriend, and the couple were sheltered by the McArthurs for ten days before being passed over to the Swedish ambassador. Diplomatic wives were generally not allowed to undertake paid work in their host country. It was in Chile that Piera McArthur learned to paint, although after advice from artist Douglas MacDiarmid she did not have formal training.

McArthur spent considerable time in Paris and Moscow, as well as postings to Brussels and the UN in New York. She was first New Zealander to have a solo show at the New Tretiakov Gallery in Moscow. McArthur is known for her colourful style. The Journal of Soviet Culture described her works as "vibrating, breathing, trembling". She lived and worked in Thorndon, Wellington. She and her husband had six children together.

== Death ==
McArthur died in Wellington on 23 October 2025, at the age of 96.

== Honours and awards ==
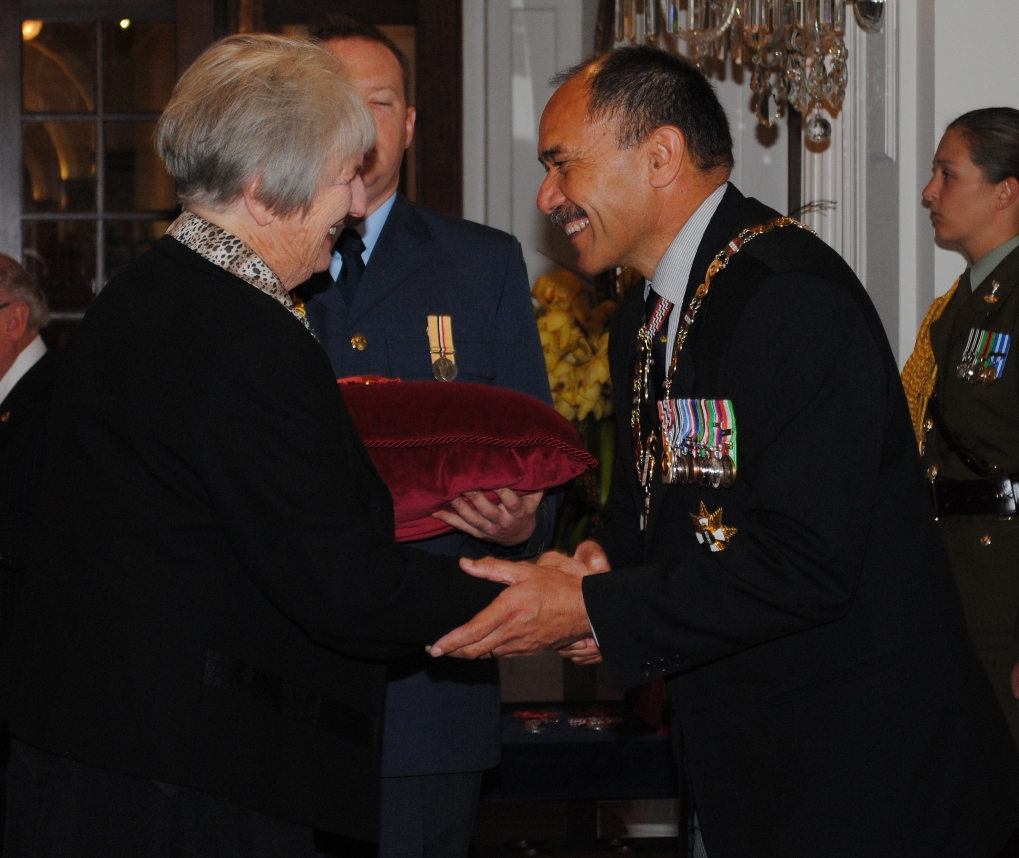
McArthur (left) being congratulated by the governor-general, Sir Jerry Mateparae, at her investiture as an Officer of the New Zealand Order of Merit, at Government House, Wellington, on 3 May 2012

In the 2012 New Year Honours, McArthur was appointed an Officer of the New Zealand Order of Merit, for services to the arts.
