= Charles Monro (rugby union) =

New Zealand rugby union player (1851–1933)

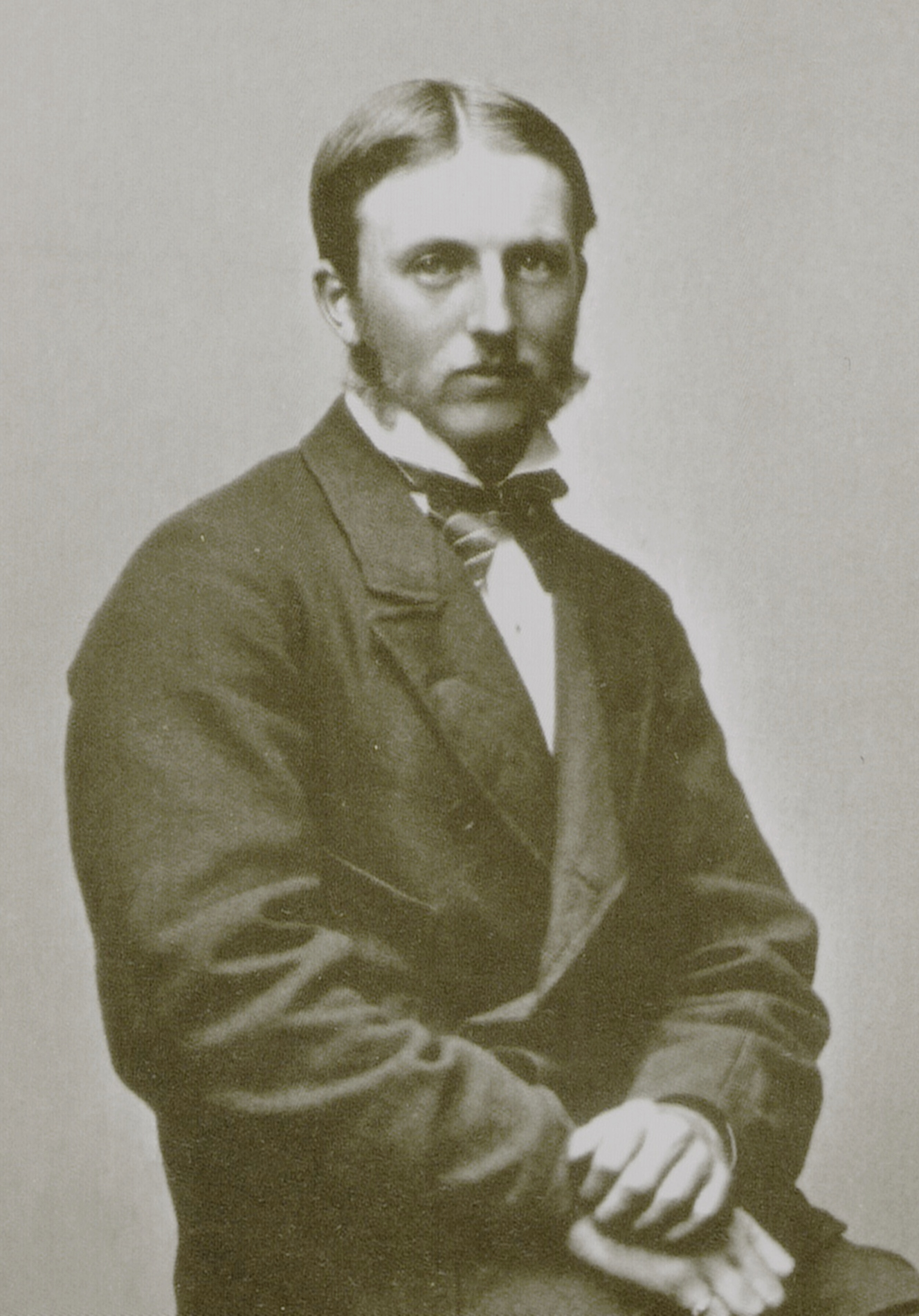
Charles John Monro

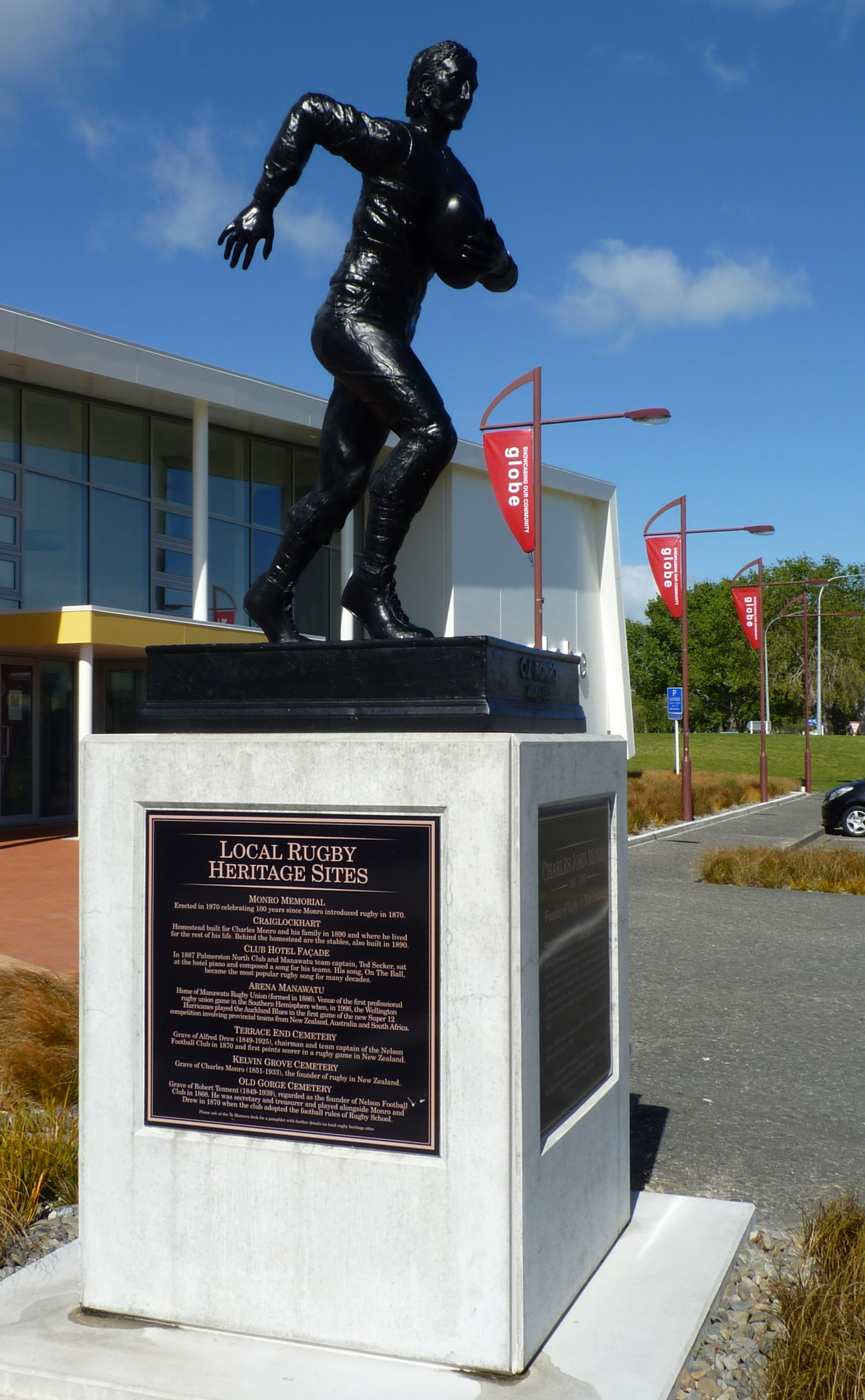
Memorial in front of New Zealand Rugby Museum, Palmerston North

Charles John Monro (5 April 1851 – 9 April 1933), sometimes also referred to as Charles Munro in accordance with his clan name, is credited with introducing rugby union to New Zealand.

== Early life ==
Monro was born on 5 April 1851 in Waimea West, near Nelson, New Zealand. He was the fourth son of politician Sir David Monro and his wife Dinah. His father would later become the second Speaker of the New Zealand House of Representatives. His sister, Maria Georgiana Monro, would marry the Scottish geologist, naturalist, and surgeon James Hector.

Monro attended Nelson College from 1863 to 1865. He became familiar with the sport of rugby at Christ's College in Finchley near London, which he attended from 1867 to 1869, playing in its 2nd XV.

== Rugby ==
Monro introduced the game under the 1868 rules of rugby and with the new Gilbert oval ball to the Nelson Football club in 1870. The first game was played between Nelson College "The Gown" and Monro's club "The Town" at the Botanics ground at 2pm on 14 May 1870.

Four months later Monro's commitment to establishing rugby in New Zealand was such that he organised, selected, and coached a Wellington team, played for a Nelson team, and refereed the first game in the North Island at Petone on 12 September 1870.

== Family life ==
Monro's life was unsettled, and he lived in England and on the continent for some time. In 1885, he married Helena Beatrice Macdonald in New Zealand; his wife was known as Lena and was the daughter of Donald MacDonald from Nelson. In 1889, Monro purchased land in Fitzherbert, on the opposite site of the Manawatu River from Palmerston North. He named their house Craiglockhart, and the Monros had five children. Monro was from a long line of doctors, the Munro of Auchinbowie family, and his three sons all became medical professionals.

He died in Palmerston North in 1933, and was buried at Kelvin Grove Cemetery. He was survived by his wife and their five children. Monro's granddaughter was the painter Piera McArthur.

== See also ==
- History of rugby union in New Zealand
- New Zealand Rugby Museum
