= Alfred Wilkins =

English cricketer

Personal information
- Full name: Alfred Daulton Wilkins
- Born: 1856; Kotri, Bombay Presidency, British India
- Died: 21 October 1920 (aged 63/64); Bedford, Bedfordshire, England
- Batting: Unknown

Domestic team information
- Years: Team
- 1892/93–1898/99: Europeans

Career statistics
Competition	First-class
Matches	3
Runs scored	15
Batting average	3.00
100s/50s	–/–
Top score	13
Catches/stumpings	2/–
- Source: ESPNcricinfo, 19 November 2022

Alfred Daulton Wilkins (1856 — 21 October 1920) was an English first-class cricketer and an officer in the Imperial Forest Service.

The son of Alfred Wilkins senior, he was born in 1856 at Kotri in British India. Wilkins was educated in England at Christ's College, Finchley and later at Tonbridge School, where he played for the cricket eleven and the football thirteen. Following the completion of his education, he returned to India, where he joined the Imperial Forest Service (IFS) in April 1875 as a mail officer in the Bombay Presidency. He was appointed an assistant conservator of forests in the Presidency in 1879, later being appointed deputy conservator of forests in Sindh in 1887. He retired from the IFS in July 1911. While in British India, Wilkins played first-class cricket for the Europeans cricket team on three occasions between 1892 and 1898 in the Bombay Presidency Matches against the Parsees. He scored 15 runs in his three matches, with a highest score of 13. He played in a notable non-first-class match in 1886 at Poona for the North of India against the South, scoring 81 not out and 218 not out. Wilkins retired to England, where he died at Bedford in October 1920.
