= Erskine College, Wellington =

Former school with historic buildings

Erskine College
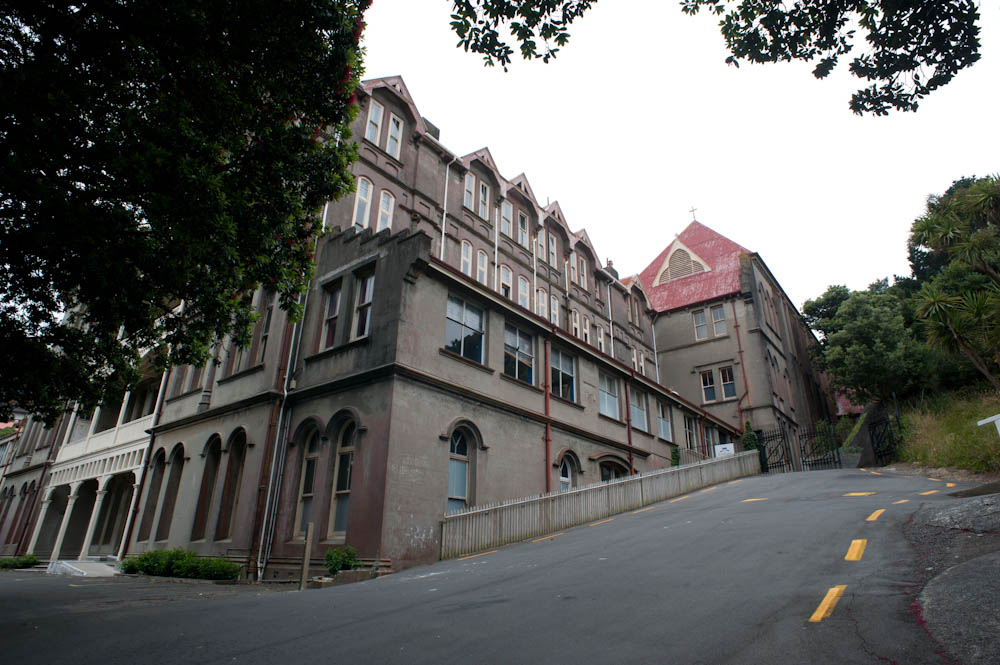
- Erskine College building, Wellington
- Former names: Convent of the Sacred Heart at Island Bay

General information
- Architectural style: French Gothic and Edwardian collegiate architecture
- Location: Corner Avon Street and Melbourne Road, Island Bay, Wellington, New Zealand
- Coordinates: 41.333434°S 174.777358°E
- Completed: 1906

Design and construction
- Architect: John Sydney Swan

Heritage New Zealand – Category 1
- Designated: 13-Aug-2009
- Reference no.: 7795

Erskine College, originally known as the Convent of the Sacred Heart, was a Catholic girls' boarding school in Island Bay, Wellington, New Zealand. The subject of a campaign to protect its historic buildings (the Chapel of the Sacred Heart and the Main Block Convent), it was largely demolished in 2018 to build housing, but the chapel was restored and later reopened in 2023.

== Construction ==
The four-storey Gothic Revival brick and reinforced concrete convent building was designed by architect John Sydney Swan and built between 1904 and 1906. It was constructed in brick (English bond) on concrete foundations and piles. The exterior walls were finished in Portland cement. More buildings were added as the school roll increased. The interior of the Chapel of the Sacred Heart, also designed by Swan and built in 1929–30, is regarded as one of the finest examples of a Gothic Revival interior in New Zealand.

Erskine College Main Block is a sound example of Edwardian architecture. It is four storeys high with gabled wings, tiered balconies and verandas and a multi-gabled roof. these elements making an intricate architectural composition. The main (west) façade is H-shaped and symmetrical, with a gabled projecting wing at each end. The space between is taken up with a system of tiered timber verandas and balconies.

The buildings have aesthetic value because of their architecture and landmark qualities. For buildings of this type, they retain a high level of authenticity with only minor changes to their front elevation.

== History ==
The Convent of the Sacred Heart (as it was initially known) was founded by nuns from the Society of the Sacred Heart (Sacré Coeur), who came to New Zealand from St Louis, at the invitation of Archbishop Redwood in 1879.

The Convent of the Sacred Heart in Island Bay was established in 1905 with the arrival of Mother Mary Dobson and six nuns from the Timaru Convent (the first of four convents in New Zealand). Wellington architect, John Swan, was commissioned to design the new school, and the foundation stone was laid on 14 May 1905. The school opened to pupils on 22 February 1906, and building was completed in two stages in 1907 and 1909. Various additions to the school have been made over the years. In 1930 the Chapel of the Sacred Heart was built alongside the college. A new wing was built in 1949, as well as a gymnasium in 1957. Then finally a final new wing was constructed in 1967.

The Convent of the Sacred Heart was only the second Catholic Secondary School established in Wellington, the first being St Patrick's College in Kilbirnie. It was one of the city's few secondary schools for girl's when it was opened in 1906. It was second of four convent schools in New Zealand run by the nuns of the Religious (formerly Society) of the Sacred Heart.

The school's name was renamed to Erskine College in 1967 to avoid confusion with Sacred Heart College in Lower Hutt. It was named after Mother Janet Erskine Stuart, the fifth Superior General of the Society of the Sacred Heart.

By 1980, the schools future was under threat, but continued as a Catholic girls' boarding school until its closure in 1985. By that time, nearly 3000 girls had been educated at the college.

Peter Jackson's 1996 film The Frighteners used Erskine College as one of its locations.

An arts school, The Learning Connexion, occupied Erskine College from 1996 to until 2009.

Eventually in 2018, An Environment Court decision had backed plans to demolish the heritage buildings at Erskine College to make way for 96 townhouses. Demolition was expected to start the year before in 2017, but plans were put on hold when the SECT (Save Erskine College Trust), refused consent to demolish or remove heritage items.

The college buildings, with the exception of the chapel, were controversially demolished by its owners The Wellington Company in 2018, to make way for the townhouses.

The chapel was restored and reopened in 2023, with a cost of about $7 million.

== Historic significance and campaign ==
The buildings and grounds were classified as a "Category I" ("places of special or outstanding historical or cultural heritage significance or value") historic place by Heritage New Zealand.

The Save Erskine College Trust was formed to protect the site in 1992, the first non-government heritage protection authority in New Zealand.

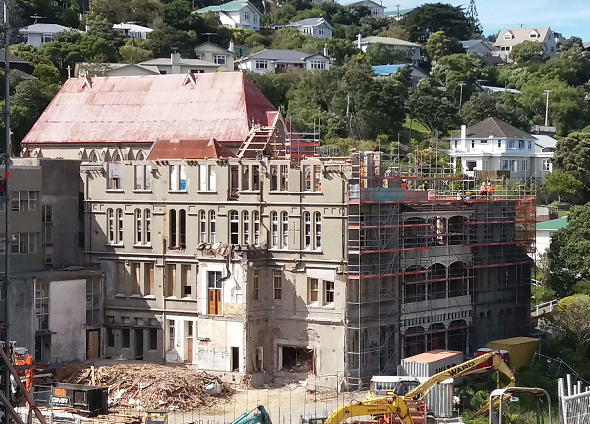
The Erskine College building being demolished in October 2018

== Notable alumnae ==
- Maggie Barry – radio and television presenter and politician
- Gabrielle Huria MNZM (born 1962) is a New Zealand Māori leader.
- Winnie Laban – politician
- Piera McArthur – artist
- Ginette McDonald – actress and comedian
- Belinda Cordwell – tennis player and sports commentator
- Nicola Young – politician
