= Pardes House Grammar School =

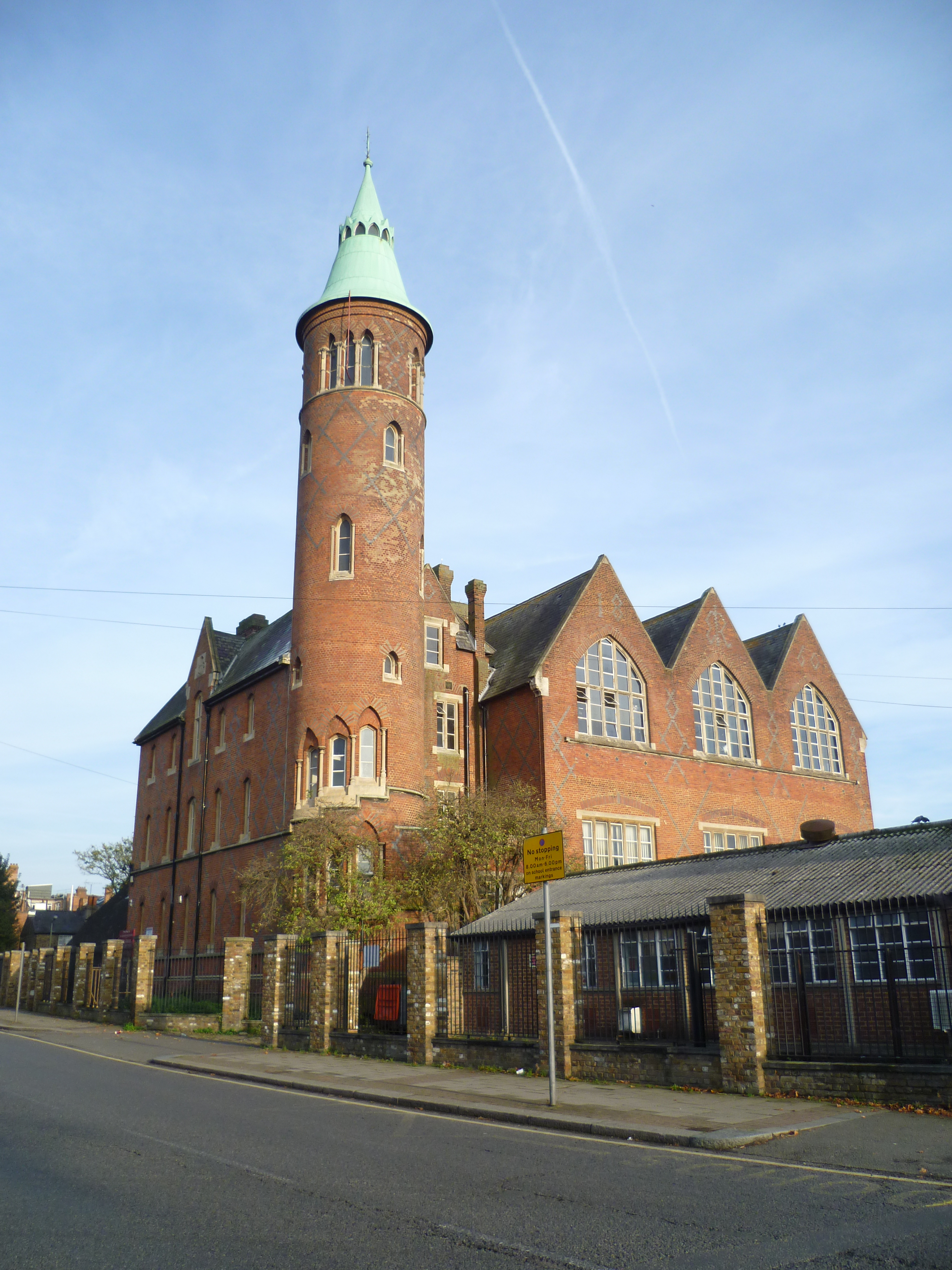

Location
- Hendon Lane; Finchley, Greater London, N3 1SA; England; 51.5992°N 0.1974°W

Information
- Type: Private school
- Religious affiliation: Orthodox Jewish
- Established: 1976
- Local authority: Barnet London Borough Council
- Department for Education URN: 101385 Tables
- Ofsted: Reports
- Head teacher: Rabbi Yitzchok Lev
- Gender: Boys
- Age range: 10–16
- Enrolment: 263 (2020)
- Capacity: 235
- Website: www.pardesgrammar.co.uk

Pardes House Grammar School is a private, Orthodox Jewish, secondary school for boys in Finchley, Greater London, England. It was established in 1976 and since 2001, it has occupied the former Christ's College school building which is a Grade II listed building that was constructed in 1860.

== See also ==
- History of Church End, Barnet
