= New Zealand Rugby Museum =

Sports museum in Palmerston North, New Zealand

Coordinates: 40.3580°S 175.6082°E

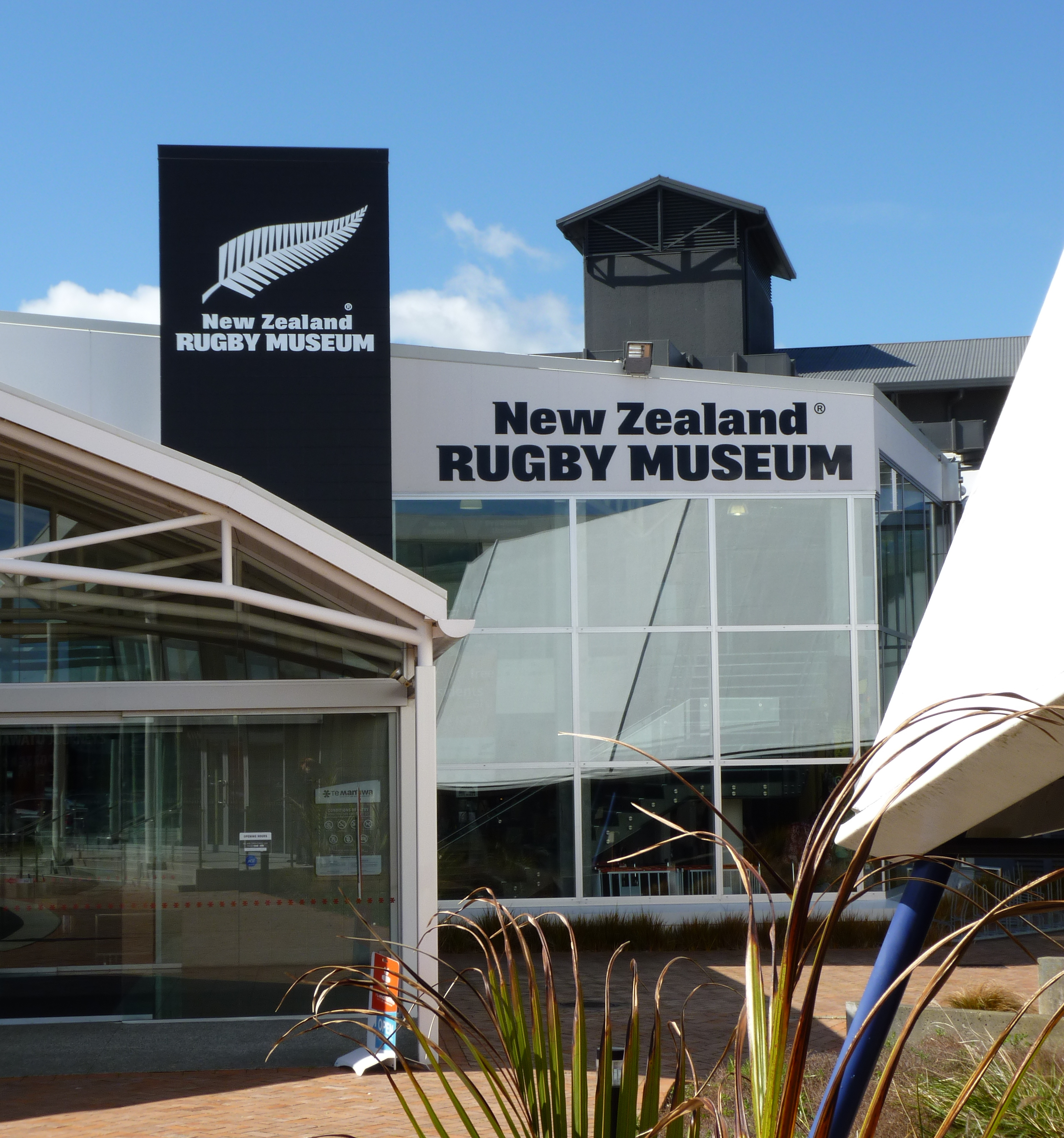
New Zealand Rugby Museum

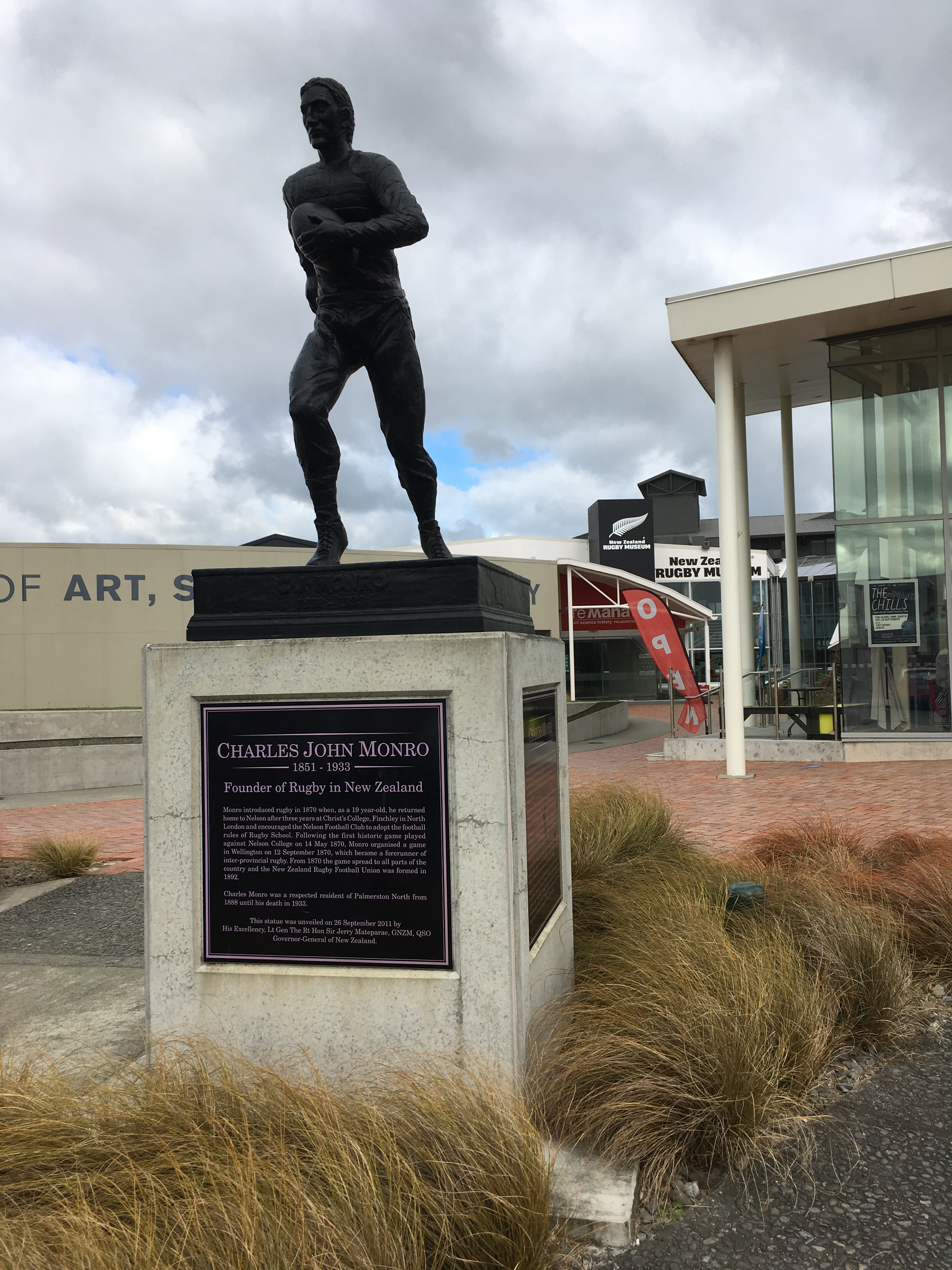
Charles Monro memorial

The New Zealand Rugby Museum, based in Palmerston North, New Zealand, is a museum dedicated to the sport of Rugby union.

== History ==
Founded by John Sinclair and Dr Fred Spurdle the museum's first exhibition was in April 1969. The Rugby Museum Society of New Zealand Incorporated was formed 14 May 1970.

The museum was modeled after the Trophy Room in Cardiff Arms Park in Wales and the collections include equipment, clothing, books, photographs, trophies, badges, video displays and many other exhibits related to the game.

The museum's presidents and patrons have included former All Blacks Sir Brian Lochore, Ian MacRae and Sir Wilson Whineray. As at 2023 the president is Dr Farah Palmer and the full-time director is Stephen Berg. Neil Monro, the grandson of Charles Monro who is credited with bringing the game of rugby union to New Zealand, has been the treasurer for over fifty years. Clive Akers who has published a number of rugby books including The New Zealand Rugby Register 1870-2015 and been co-editor of the Rugby Almanack since 1994, is the committee chair.

The museum moved into larger premises adjacent to the Palmerston North Civic Centre within the Te Manawa museum of art, science and history prior to the Rugby World Cup 2011. The Museum was part of the REAL New Zealand Festival, a series of cultural events and activities coordinated with the hosting of the Cup. A handful of the approximately 50,000 holdings are contributed to NZMuseums, the combined catalog of museums across New Zealand. As well as collecting objects connected to key historic matches, the museum also loans particular items for particular uses.

The museum is managed by the Rugby Museum Society of New Zealand, a registered charity and Associate Member of the New Zealand Rugby Union.
