= John Swan (architect) =

New Zealand architect (1874–1936)

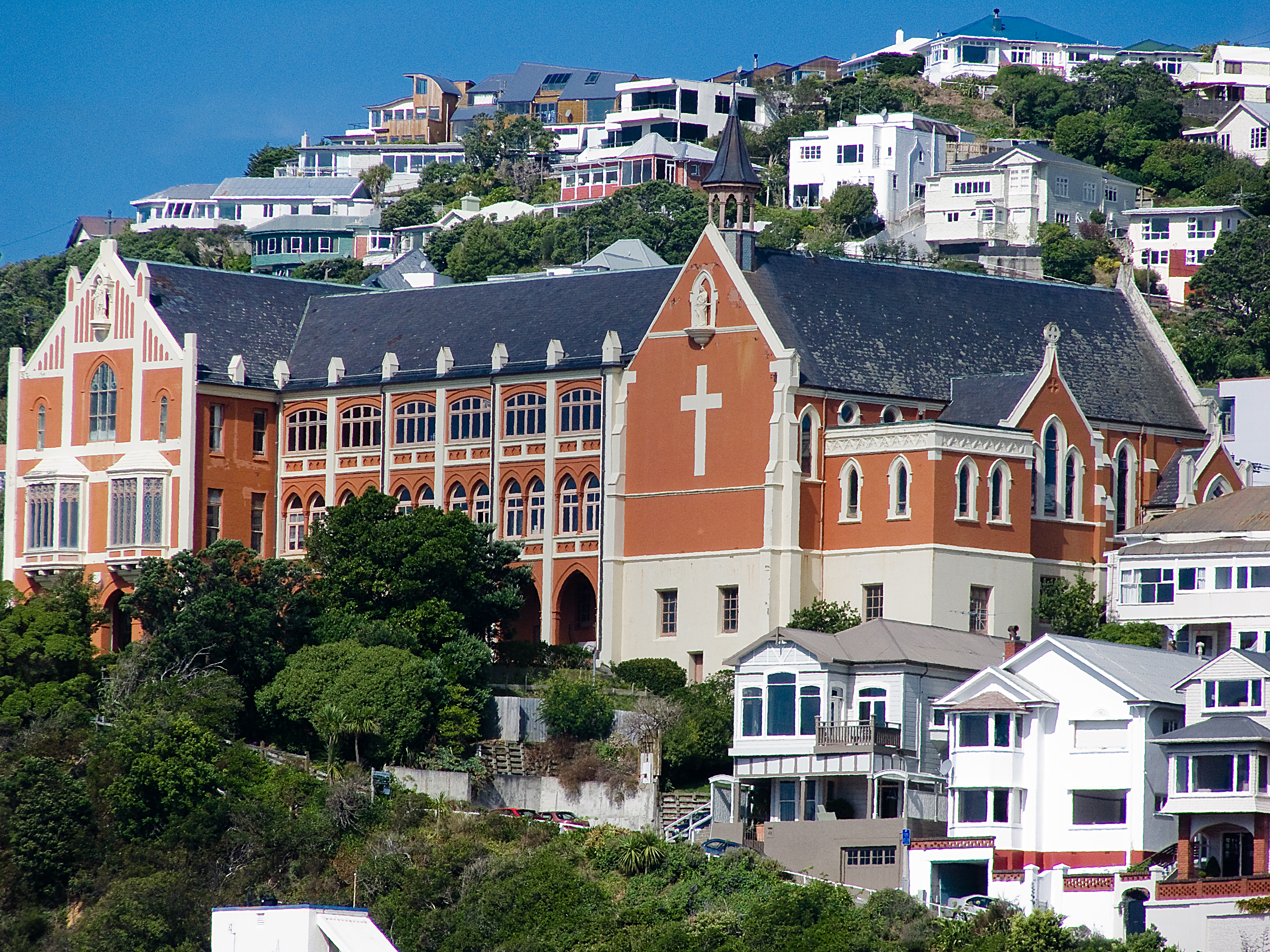
St Gerard's Church and Monastery in 2008

John Sydney Swan (12 January 1874 – 18 April 1936) (sometimes seen as Sidney) was a New Zealand architect, the designer of houses and churches in Wellington, New Zealand. He was articled to Frederick de Jersey Clere and was at one time a partner with Clere. Buildings he designed include Erskine College and the St Gerard's church section of the St Gerard's Church and Monastery, Our Lady of Compassion Convent, Island Bay (1908-1921) for Suzanne Aubert and various commercial buildings, houses and Wellington Harbour Board buildings.

He was born and died in Wellington. He married Gertrude Mary Holcroft in 1899, they had three sons and one daughter. He built his own home, The Moorings, in Glenbervie Terrace, Thorndon in 1905. The house has nautical themes running throughout, a reflection of his interest in sailing. His younger brother Francis Herbert Swan (1885–1956) also lived in Glenbervie Terrace, and in 1915 they formed an architectural partnership; Swan and Swan; later Swan, Lawrence and Swan with Charles Lawrence. Toward the end of his career Swan formed a partnership with Jim Lavelle as Swan and Lavelle.

He was a yachtsman, and Commodore of the Royal Port Nicholson Yacht Club. When he died in 1936 it was said he had one of the finest collections of ship photographs in the world.
