= Frank den Hollander =

Dutch mathematician (born 1956)

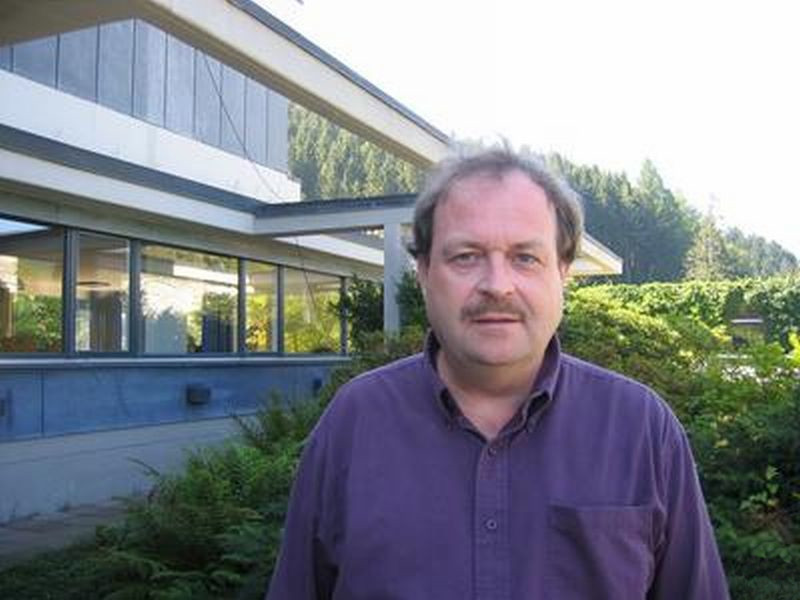
Den Hollander at Oberwolfach, 2006

Frank den Hollander (born 1 December 1956) is a Dutch mathematician.

== Education and career ==
Frank den Hollander studied theoretical physics at Leiden University with undergraduate degree and MSc in 1980 and a PhD in 1985 with thesis advisor Pieter Kasteleyn and thesis Random Walks on Random Lattices. As a postdoc he studied from 1985 to 1989 with Michael Keane at Delft Technical University (TU Delft) and from 1989 to 1991 was at TU Delft on a scholarship from the Royal Netherlands Academy of Arts and Sciences. Den Hollander was from 1991 to 1994 an associate professor at Utrecht University and from 1994 to 2000 a professor of probability and statistics at the Radboud University Nijmegen. He was from 2000 to 2005 a professor at Eindhoven University of Technology (TU Eindhoven) and scientific director of EURANDOM (TU Eindhoven's center for stochastic sciences). In 2005 he became a professor at Leiden University.

His research deals with probability theory (e.g. theory of large deviations, potential theory methods, and systems of interacting particles), statistical physics (including applications of variational methods to phase transitions), ergodic theory, population genetics, and complex networks.

Den Hollander has been a visiting professor at several academic institutions around the world, including a visit from August 1998 to January 1999 at the Fields Institute in Toronto.

== Honors and awards ==
- 2003 — Lévy Lecturer of the Bernoulli Society in Rio de Janeiro
- 2004 — Invited Speaker at the European Congress of Mathematicians in Stockholm
- 2005 — elected a member of the Royal Netherlands Academy of Arts and Sciences
- 2010 — Invited Speaker at the International Congress of Mathematicians in Hyderabad
- 2012 — elected a Fellow of the American Mathematical Society
- 2013 — elected a Fellow of the Institute of Mathematical Statistics
- 2016 — Medallion Lecturer at the World Congress of Probability and Statistics in Toronto
- 2016 — Knight of the Order of the Netherlands Lion

== Selected publications ==
- Large Deviations. Fields Institute Monographs 14. AMS. 2000.; Hollander, Frank den (2008). 2008 reprint. American Mathematical Soc. ISBN 978-0-8218-4435-9.
- Random Polymers. Lecture Notes in Mathematics 1974. Springer. 2009. ISBN 978-3-642-00332-5.
- with Anton Bovier: Metastability. Grundlehren der mathematischen Wissenschaften 351. Springer. 2015. ISBN 978-3-319-24777-9.
