= Christian Hollander =

Dutch composer

Christian Hollander (c.1510-15 – 1589) was a Dutch composer.

Hollander was born in Dordrecht. From 1549 to 1557 Hollander was kapelmeester of the choir at St. Walburga's church in Oudenaarde, near Brussels. After 1557 he became a member of the chapel of Ferdinand I in Germany and Austria. His works include those published 1570 (reprinted 1574) in Munich, and pieces preserved in manuscripts including the Leiden choirbooks.
