= Bernard Hollander =

Austrian-English psychiatrist (1864–1934)

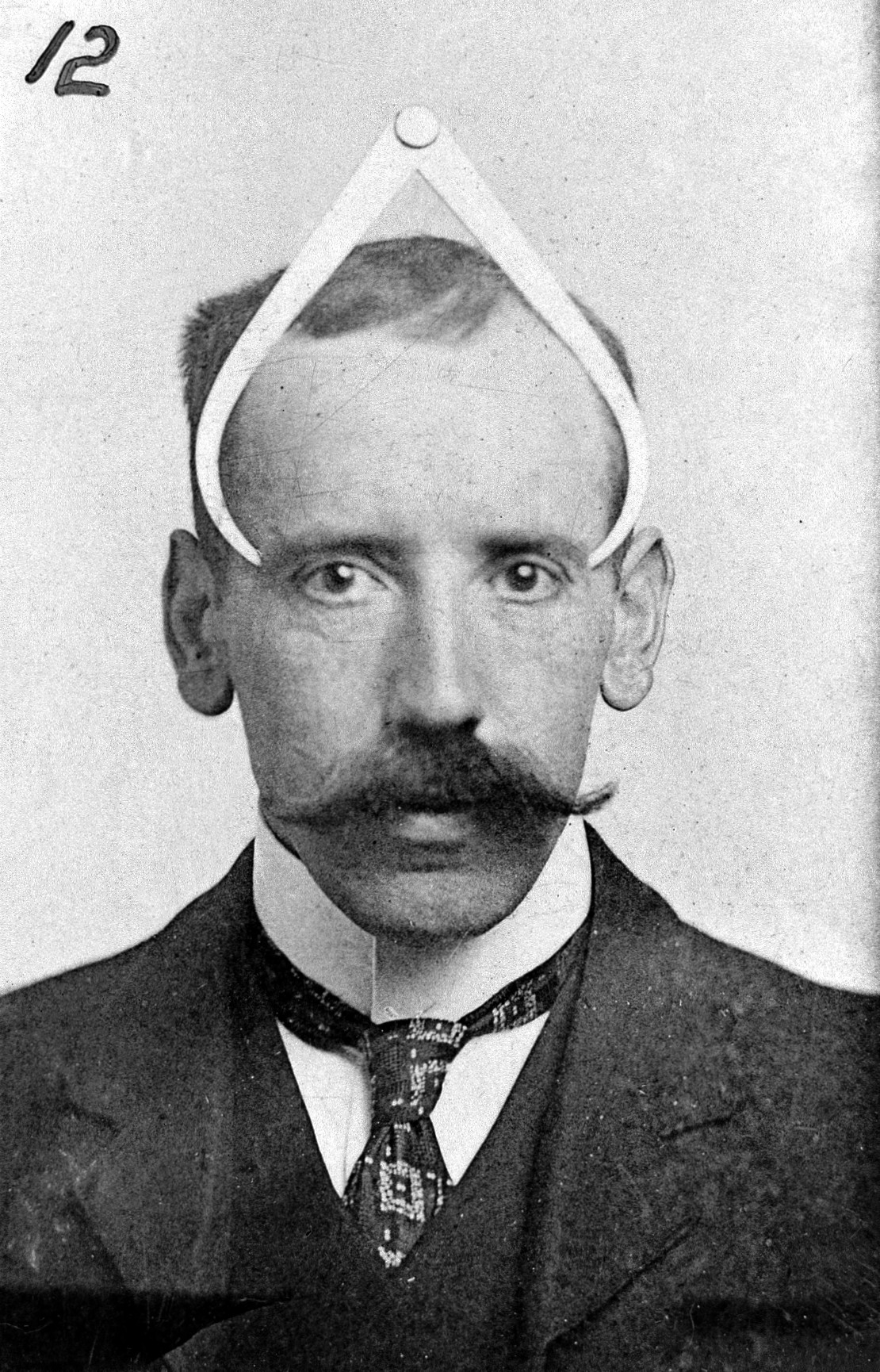
Bernard Hollander

Bernard Hollander (1864 – 6 February 1934) was a London psychiatrist and one of the main proponents of the new interest in phrenology in the early 20th century.

== Life and work ==
Hollander was born in Vienna, and settled in London in 1883, where he attended King's College. After graduation he was appointed to the post of physician at the British Hospital for Mental Disorders and Brain Diseases. Hollander was naturalized a British citizen in 1894.

Hollander first received critical acclaim for his Positive Philosophy of the Mind (L. N. Fowler, 1891). His main works, The Mental Function of the Brain (1901) and Scientific Phrenology (1902), are an appraisal of the teachings of Franz Joseph Gall. Hollander also introduced a quantitative approach to the phrenological diagnosis, defining a methodology for measuring the skull and comparing the measurements with statistical averages.

Hollander founded the Ethological Society, and was the first editor of the Ethological Journal.
