= Anthony Hollander =

Anthony Hollander (born 4 February 1964) is a biologist who has worked at the University of Liverpool since June 2014. He starting out as the Head of the Institute of Integrative Biology, and then appointed as the Pro-Vice-Chancellor for Research & Impact in August 2017. A post he still occupies as well as being the Professor of Stem Cell Biology at the university and the Chair of the N8 Research Partnership Strategic Executive Group.

== Career ==
In 2009, Biddy Baxter, the editor of the children's television programme Blue Peter published a selection of children's letters received by the Blue Peter team. Amongst them was a letter from Hollander who had written in 1973 that he knew how to save lives. Having gone on to pioneer stem cell therapies for diseases of the cartilage, he now says that he owes his career to Miss Baxter: "If her letter had shown any hint of ridicule or disbelief I might perhaps never have trained to become a medical scientist or been driven to achieve the impossible dream, and really make a difference to a human being's life."

Hollander grew up in North West London, one of six children. He was a pupil at Christ's College Finchley and from there went to The University of Bath where he read for a degree in Pharmacology and graduated with First Class Honours in 1987. He then moved to The University of Bristol where he undertook his doctoral research in the field of cartilage degradation in arthritis. He was awarded his PhD in 1990. He then moved to Montreal, Canada where he was a postdoctoral scientist at McGill University for three years, again studying cartilage degradation in arthritis. In 1993 he was awarded a three-year Fellowship from The Arthritis Research Campaign (now Arthritis Research UK) to be based in The University of Sheffield where he was appointed as lecturer. He was promoted to Reader in 1999 and he was then appointed to his chair at The University of Bristol in 2000. In 2010, The Times newspaper ranking of Britain's 100 most important scientists included him at number 39 on the list. He was elected as President of The International Cartilage Repair Society for the term of office May 2012 until September 2013.

He is co-founder, Director and Chief Scientific Officer of Azellon Cell Therapeutics, a University of Bristol spin-out company funded to undertake the first clinical trial of stem cells for the treatment of torn knee cartilage. The trial was completed on 5 patients who had sustained white-zoned meniscal tears and the results were published in 2016.

He was appointed the Head of the Institute of Integrative Biology at the University of Liverpool in June 2014. The Institute lies at the heart of a bio-medical-science campus in Liverpool and has integrated bioscience structures with internationally recognized expertise ranging from electrons to ecosystems. Its science serves several key societal themes, including food security, health and welfare, diagnostics, biodiversity and conservation and biofuels.
