= Sunair =

Airline of New Zealand

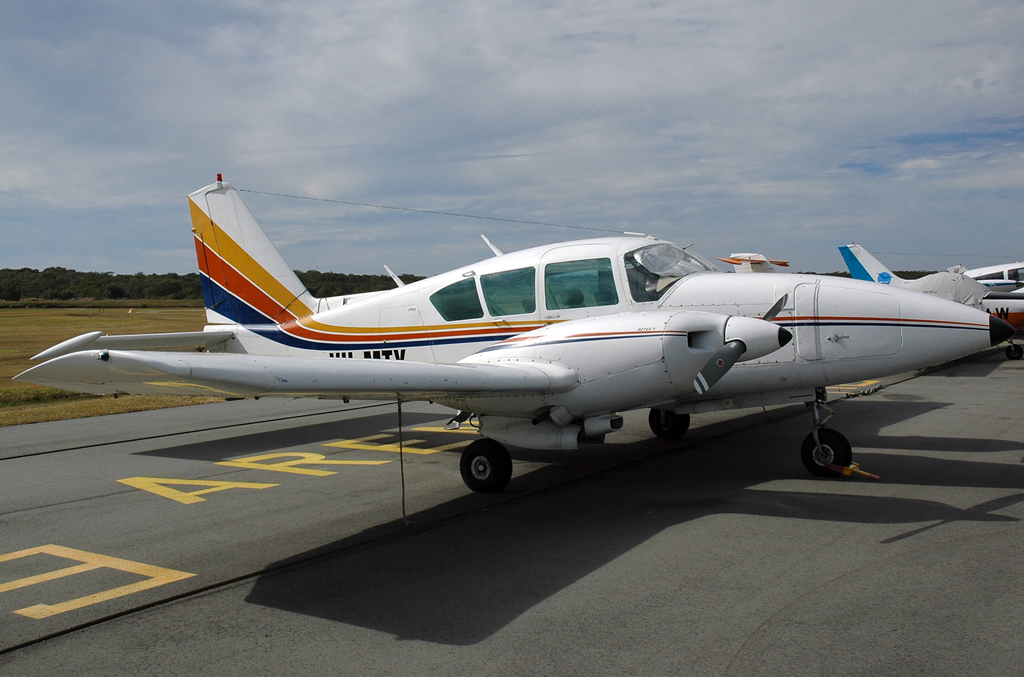
- Sunair Piper Aztec
IATA	ICAO	Call sign
ZU	SAV	SUNAIR
- Founded: 1985
- Commenced operations: 1988
- Hubs: Tauranga Airport
- Fleet size: 12
- Destinations: 11
- Headquarters: Tauranga, New Zealand
- Key people: Daniel Power (CEO)
- Website: www.sunair.co.nz

Sunair Aviation Ltd is an airline headquartered in Tauranga, on the North Island of New Zealand. It operates scheduled services, flying to Gisborne, Hamilton, Wairoa, Napier, Whangārei, Whitianga, Whakatāne and Great Barrier Island. It also has charter and pilot training operations. Sunair has fifteen aircraft.

== History ==
Sunair was started by Dan and Bev Power in 1985 doing aircraft import, sales and maintenance at Tauranga Airport. They bought a PA-32-260 Cherokee Six in November 1988 and started a summer service from Tauranga to Great Barrier Island. They leased a 402B Utiliner in December 1988 and started a daily service from Tauranga to Auckland. In late 1989 or early 1990 they purchased Island Air Safaris, including their Cessna P206 Super Skylane, and took over their Tauranga to Mōtītī Island service.

The Civil Aviation Authority of New Zealand (CAA) suspended the airline's Air Operator Certificate, along with the Certificate of Airworthiness for the Sunair fleet, on 8 September 2017. No reason has been made public by the Authority. The airline remained inoperative while the matter was pursued by the authority. Sunair remained grounded for 203 days until the CCA granted it permission to fly again in April 2018.

The first service resumed after the suspension was the doctor service between Whangārei and Kaitaia, which Sunair had been able to continue to operate using leased aircraft. Scheduled services were offered again from 28 May 2018 with flights being offered from Hamilton or Tauranga to Great Barrier Island or Whangārei, and from Great Barrier Island to Whitianga or Whangārei.

The airline has a safe, accident-free record. It operates over 4,000 flights a year.

== Destinations ==
As of October 2026, Sunair currently operates services from the following destinations:

City	Airport	Notes
Auckland	Ardmore Airport	
Claris	Great Barrier Aerodrome	
Gisborne	Gisborne Airport	
Hamilton	Hamilton Airport	
Napier	Hawkes Bay Airport	
Tauranga	Tauranga Airport	
Wairoa	Wairoa Aerodrome	
Whakatāne	Whakatāne Airport	
Whangārei	Whangarei Airport	
Whitianga	Whitianga Aerodrome	

=== Former destinations ===
This is a partial list.

- Auckland – Auckland Airport
- New Plymouth – New Plymouth Airport
- Palmerston North – Palmerston North Airport
- Paraparaumu – Kapiti Coast Airport
- Kerikeri – Kerikeri Airport
- Wellington – Wellington Airport
- Rotorua – Rotorua Airport
- North Shore – North Shore Aerodrome

== Fleet ==
As of December 2020, the Sunair fleet consists of the following light aircraft:

- Three Cessna 172
- Nine Piper PA-23 Aztec

Sunair has previously flown the following airplanes.

- Cessna 206
- Cessna 402
- Cessna 421
- Partenavia P.68
- Piper PA-28 Cherokee
- Piper PA-31 Navajo
