= Air New Zealand Flight 4374 =

1979 aviation accident

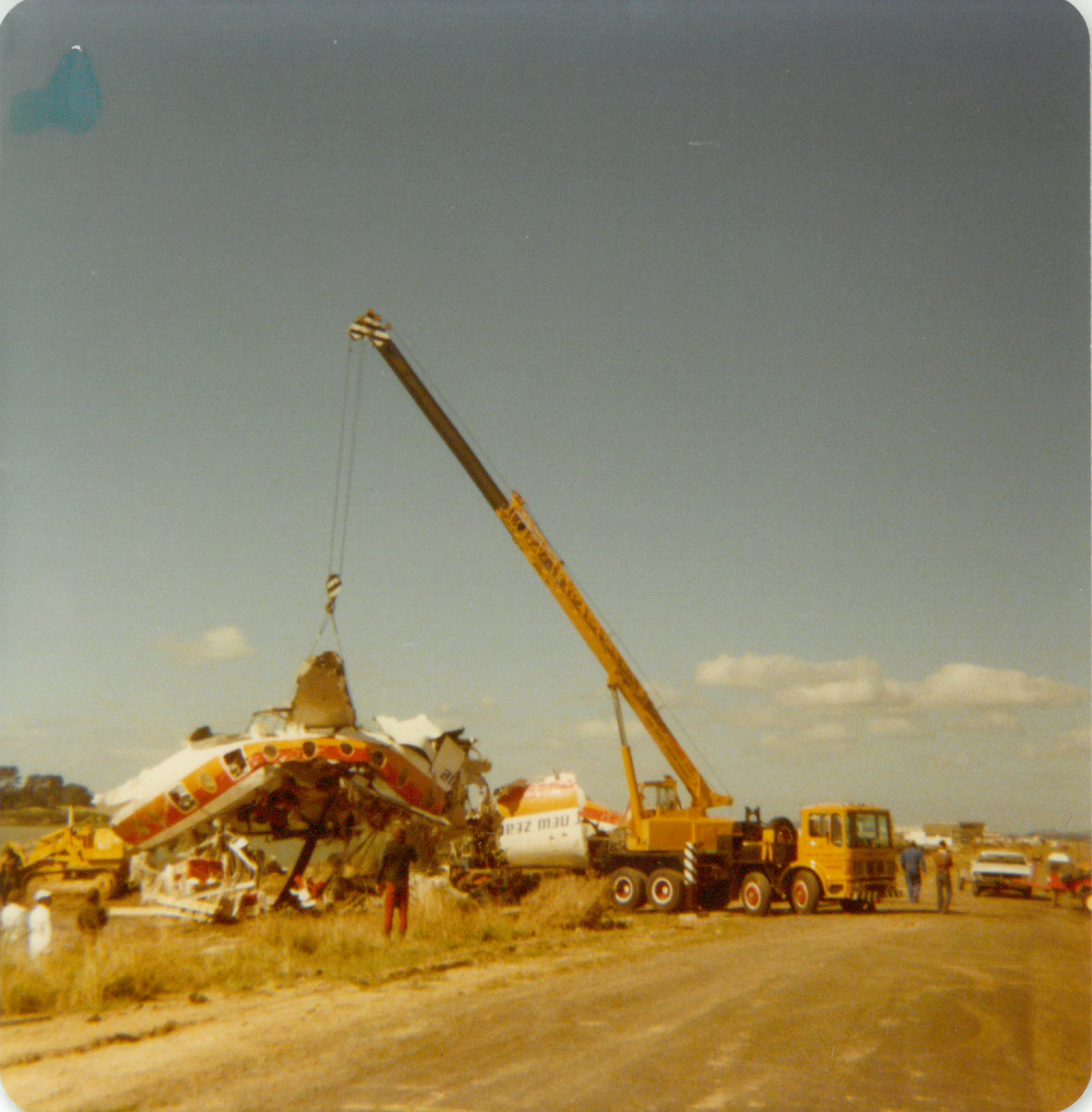
- Recovery of aircraft from harbour in Mangere, Auckland.

Accident
- Date: 17 February 1979
- Summary: Controlled flight into terrain
- Site: Manukau Harbour

Aircraft
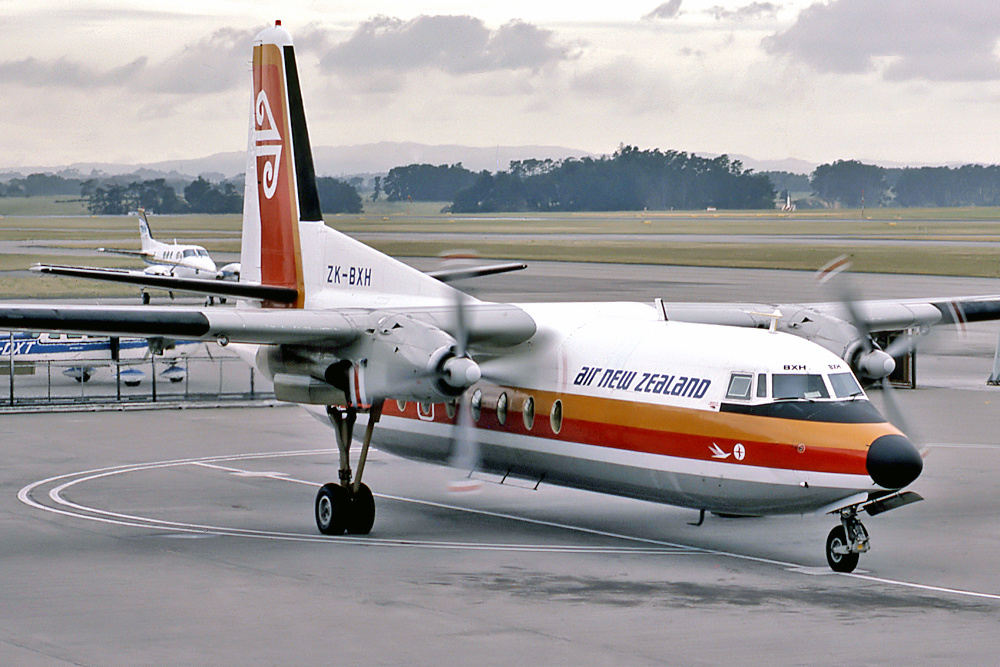
- An Air New Zealand Fokker F27 similar to the one involved.
- Aircraft type: Fokker F-27 Friendship
- Operator: Air New Zealand
- IATA flight No.: NZ4374
- ICAO flight No.: ANZ4374
- Call sign: NATIONAL 374
- Registration: ZK-NFC
- Flight origin: Gisborne Airport
- Destination: Auckland International Airport
- Passengers: 2
- Crew: 2
- Fatalities: 2
- Injuries: 2
- Survivors: 2

Air New Zealand Flight 4374 was a flight from Gisborne which crashed while landing at Auckland in poor weather, killing two of the four people on board.

== Aircraft and crew ==
The Fokker Friendship F27-500 was eight years old at the time of the crash. The aircraft had been operated by the New Zealand National Airways Corporation (NAC) until the merger with Air New Zealand in 1977. The aircraft had accumulated 18,718 flight hours through 25,704 flight cycles. The aircraft was returning from Gisborne Airport with two engineers who had gone there to service another aircraft.

The flight was piloted by 38-year-old Captain Anthony Circuitt and 33-year-old First Officer Barrie Moran.

== Crash and rescue ==
At 14:28 the aircraft had descended to 3000 feet and the pilots deployed the flaps. The aircraft's speed was 165 knots, and increased to 211 knots; 2 minutes 14 seconds later the aircraft crashed into the harbour 1km west of the intended runway, killing two, the captain and a passenger. At the time of the crash, Auckland was experiencing its heaviest rainfall in 43 years, and the visibility was officially described as "restricted".

An Air New Zealand Boeing 737 aircraft which departed 2 minutes after the crash attempted to alert the control tower about the accident. However, the controllers denied that they were alerted.

Two survivors were found supporting themselves on the tip of the aircraft fuselage and were rescued by navy divers in two rubber inflatable Zodiac boats. Rescue efforts were hindered due to strong rips in the harbour. The two survivors were taken to Middlemore Hospital. Captain Circuitt's body was freed by navy divers around 3.5 hours after the crash, whilst engineer John Forbes's body was recovered later that night. At the time of the accident, Auckland Airport's rescue hovercraft was undergoing an overhaul and was unable to serve the downed aircraft, further hindering rescue efforts. The hovercraft was also known to be unreliable, sparking discussion on the airport's rescue response and safety.

The aircraft wreckage was recovered through the use of inflatable bags, floating the wreck back to shore.

== Investigation ==
The aircraft's flight recorders (black boxes) was recovered and sent to Melbourne for investigation by the Australian Ministry of Transport Air Safety Investigation Branch.

The investigation found that the crew were likely misled by a visual illusion due to a rain shower obscuring the runway threshold during their base turn. This, coupled with a failure to monitor their flight instruments effectively due to the pilots believing they were at a safe height, caused the aircraft to crash into the harbour.

== Aftermath ==
Immediately after the crash, there were discussions questioning Auckland Airport's safety. It was found that the airport's rescue hovercraft had been inoperable for a year, however, the Minister of Transport at the time stated that the airport has met the International Civil Aviation Organization's (ICAO) safety requirements. A report from the Auckland Star mentioned that only one of the inflatable boats was able to be immediately used as another had an unserviceable outboard motor. The Minister of Transport then requested a report on why one of the boats had a unserviceable motor. New Zealand Prime Minister Robert Muldoon attempted to reassure the public by stating that “if at any time and for whatever reason equipment and personnel are unable to meet those standards, the airport is closed for aircraft movements" and that "the airport was complying with the required standards when an Air New Zealand Friendship aircraft crashed". A wind-measuring system was added at the end of the runway shortly after the crash.

In October 1980, Mr N.J. Jones, a Labour Party spokesperson stated the government's intention to introduce a special aviation tax to finance airport safety, as the crash had indicated that the level of safety needed had not been met.

The accident led to the appointment of the Rescue and fire services at International Airports Commission of Inquiry. Between the time of accident and the preparation of the report, Auckland Airport implemented multiple safety improvements including upgrading facilities, increased fire rescue staff, and the institution of a more effective maintenance program for the rescue hovercraft. Furthermore, Wellington Airport also implemented safety improvements such as the inclusion of Wellington Sea-rescue Service and upgrades to the airport fire station. Initially scheduled for release in March 1980, the report was officially released in November. The report stated that although the fire rescue service at Auckland Airport, Christchurch Airport, and Wellington Airport were generally satisfactory, there were numerous deficiencies discovered. Furthermore, the report added that the deficiencies in the maintenance of rescue and firefighting equipment could impact the ability of the Rescue Fire Service to make the most effective response in the event of an emergency. The recruitment and training of Rescue Fire Service personnel was also deemed unsatisfactory by the Ministry of Transport. The report suggested several recommendations to improve the fire and rescue services and response at major New Zealand airports.
