= Mānawa Bay =

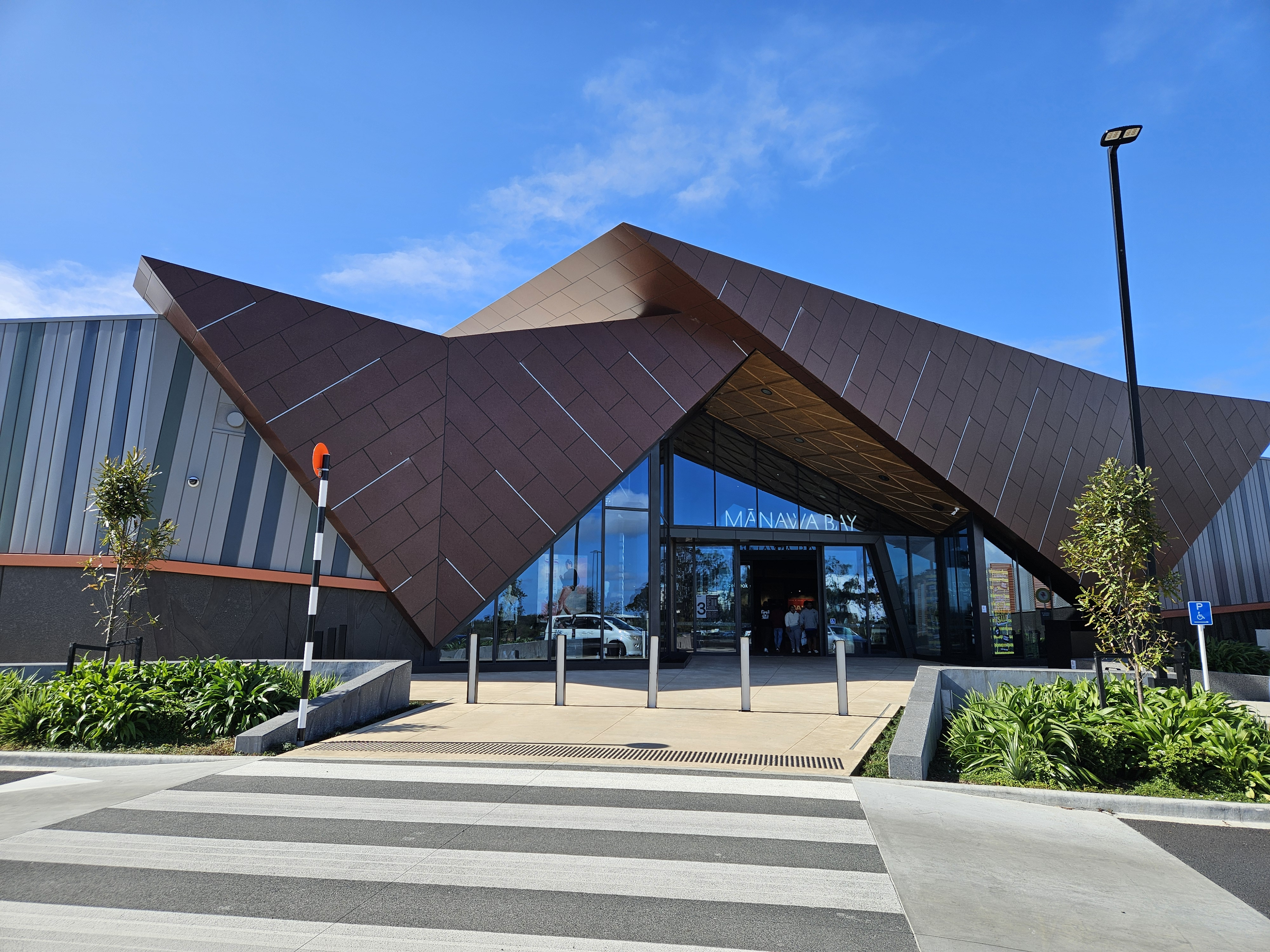
- Location: Auckland Airport, Auckland, New Zealand
- Coordinates: 36.99660°S 174.80293°E
- Address: 4 Jimmy Ward Cres, Māngere
- Opened: 19 September 2024; 2 years ago
- Owner: Auckland International Airport Limited
- Num. of stores: 100+
- Floor area: 24,000 sq m
- Website: www.manawabay.co.nz

Mānawa Bay is an outlet shopping centre located in Auckland, New Zealand. It has more than 100 stores, mainly outlets and restaurant space, situated under a 35,000m^{2} building. It is situated by Auckland Airport, on the corner of Tom Pearce Drive and Jimmy Ward Crescent.

The centre is named after its location by Pukaki Creek, as "Mānawa" translates to "mangroves" in English, reflecting the area's abundant mangrove population.

== Development ==
The centre was developed by Auckland International Airport Limited with an overall cost of NZ$200 million+; the centre was New Zealand's first 5 Green Star retail centre, using methods such as optimising use of resources and cutting carbon emissions by implementing a rooftop solar system estimated to provide 2.3 megawatts of electricity.

The coastal site is located northeast of Auckland Airport, with a total area of 150,000 square metres (1,600,000 sq ft). The land was previously leased as the Aviation Country Club golf course before the construction of the shopping centre took place in early 2023. The construction of the centre took over a year, and it was opened on 19 September 2024.

=== Opening issues ===
During opening week, a large shopper turnout resulted in widespread traffic delays around the Airport precinct, leading to a number of flight delays as flight crews and airline staff were affected. This attracted negative media attention during the centre's opening, critiquing the poor location and traffic management measures that took place.
