= Tauranga City Airshow =

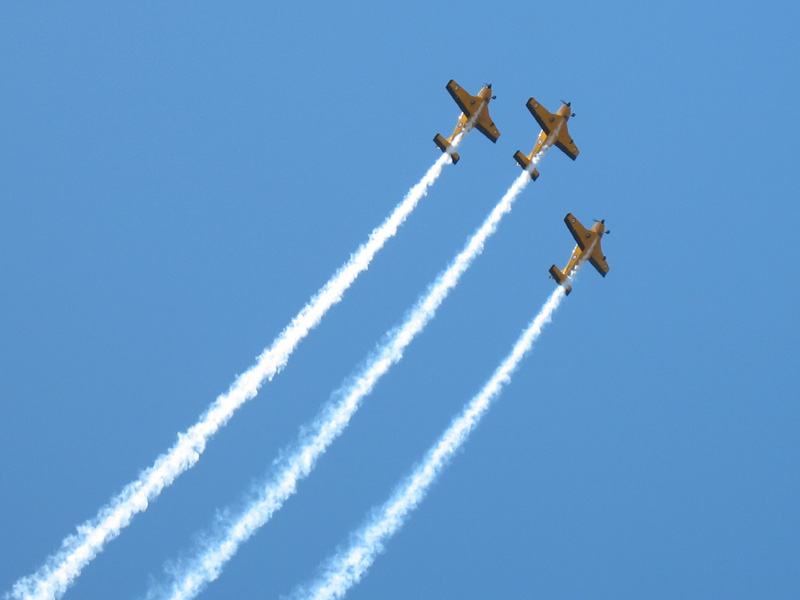
- Aerobatic Display
- Locations: Tauranga, New Zealand
- Coordinates: 37°40′24″S 176°11′50″E
- Organiser: Classic Flyers Museum
- Website: www.taurangaairshow.co.nz

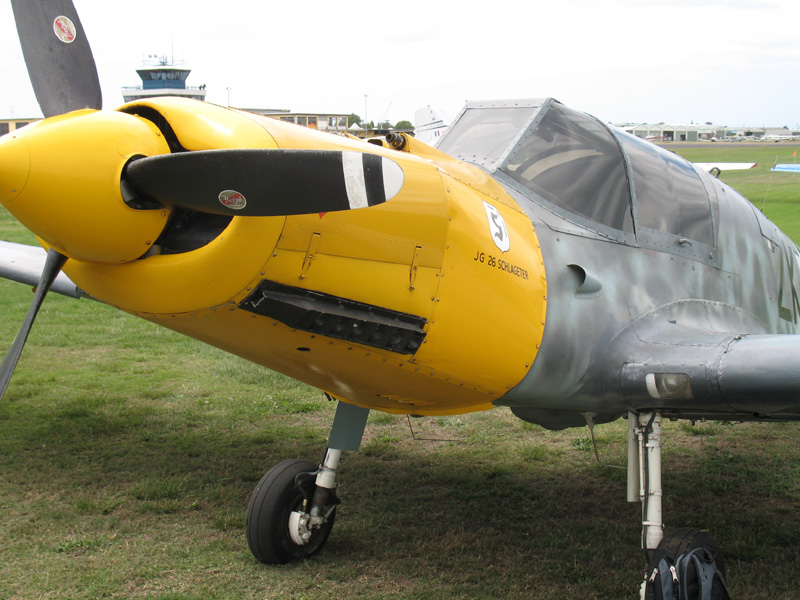
Messerschmitt Bf 108

The Tauranga City Airshow is a biennial show held in Tauranga, New Zealand. It features displays of classic, private, and military aircraft.

== History ==
Tauranga Airport has hosted airshows regularly since its inception, and in particular since 1946 when its first commercial services started. The airshows have regularly involved the local aviation community, including the Tauranga Aero Club, the local flight training schools, and recently the SAA-Sport Aircraft Association. The Royal New Zealand Air Force have been regular attendees with their Red Checkers aerobatics displays.

The Tauranga City Airshow is now managed by the Classic Flyers Museum in cooperation with the Tauranga City Council. The airshow had previously been run by the Sports Aircraft Association and was known as the Tauranga Airshow.

The Classic Flyers Museum is situated on the airfield itself, and features a range of flying aircraft and static displays.

== Notable appearances ==
The single seater Hawker Hunter based at the Classic Flyers Museum is a regular performer at the show. There is also a non-flying two seater model on display.

The P-51 Mustang.

The Messerschmitt Bf 108.

The Cessna A-37 Dragonfly owned by The Historic Aircraft Trust comes from the Vietnam era and featured in the 2008 Airshow.

The Royal New Zealand Air Force Red Checkers.

The De Havilland Devon owned by The Historic Aircraft Trust.

The Douglas DC-3 owned by The Historic Aircraft Trust.

== Highlights ==
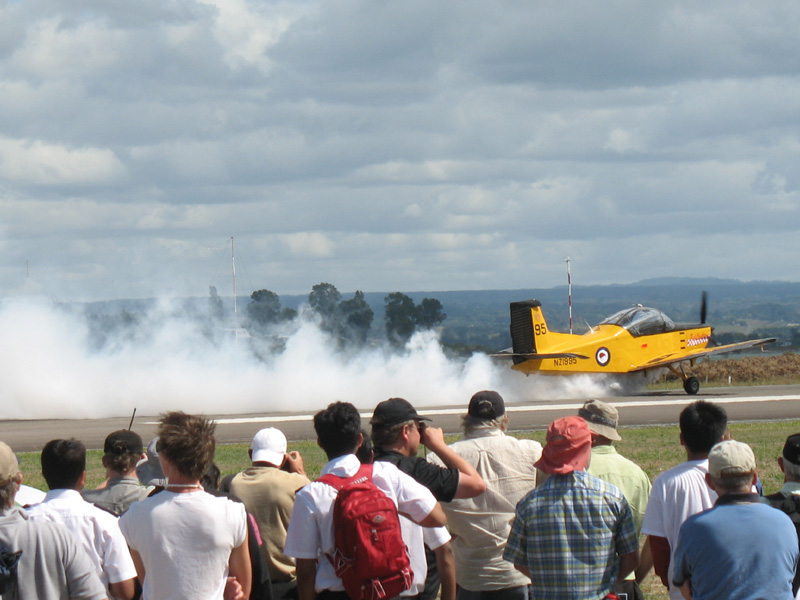
RNZAF Red Checkers

The Royal New Zealand Air Force The Royal New Zealand Air Force Red Checkers aerobatic display.

=== Sports Aircraft Association aircraft ===
The Sports Aircraft Association regularly gather over 100 sports and homebuilt aircraft from throughout New Zealand.

=== Military display ===
In addition to the military aircraft on display, the show also includes a variety of military vehicles and equipment from the Tauranga Military Museum, also located on the Airport. The equipment display is complemented by the participation of the local Military Re-enactors who dress in up period uniform, and perform mock battles with the military aircraft performing at the show.

=== Hot-air balloons ===
A recent addition is the appearance of hot-air balloons, with attendees being able to ascend under tether to gain a bird's-eye view of the show.

=== Parachutists ===
A display from the local members of the New Zealand Parachute Industry.

== Photo gallery ==
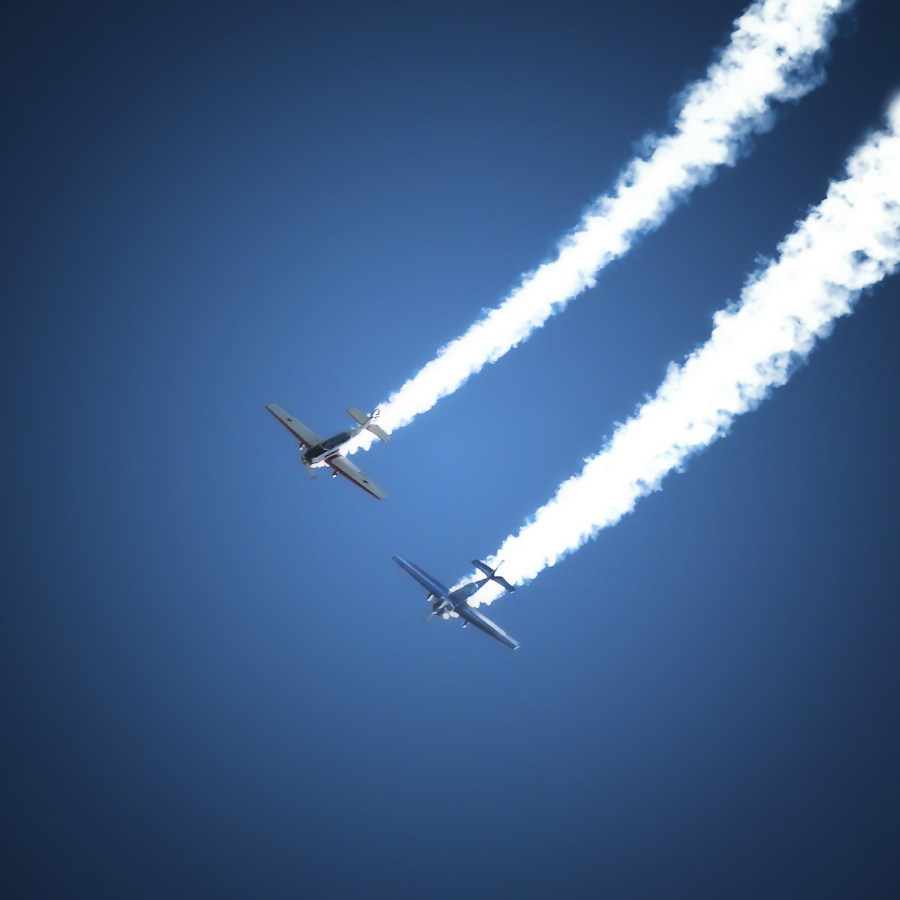
Stunt planes performing aerobatics

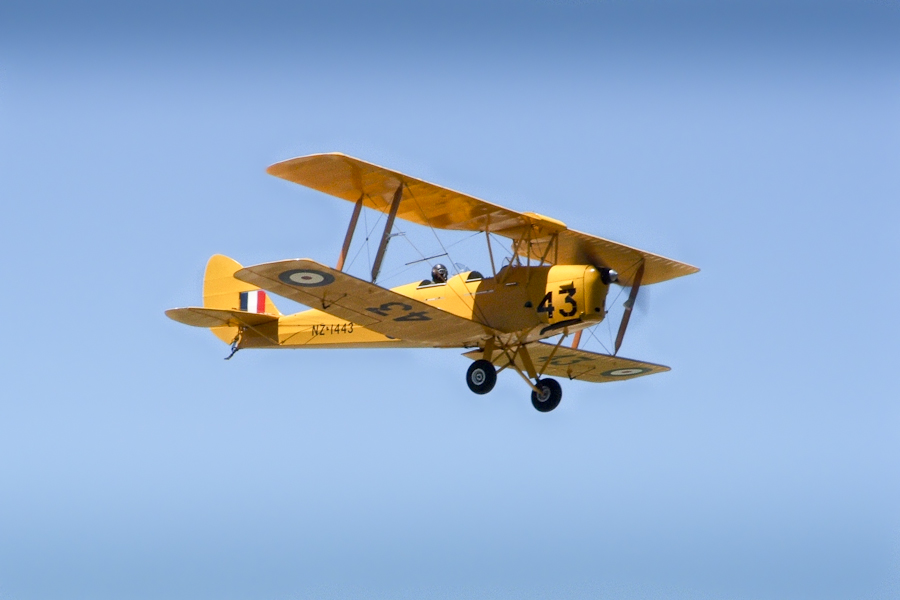
Vintage Yellow Aircraft

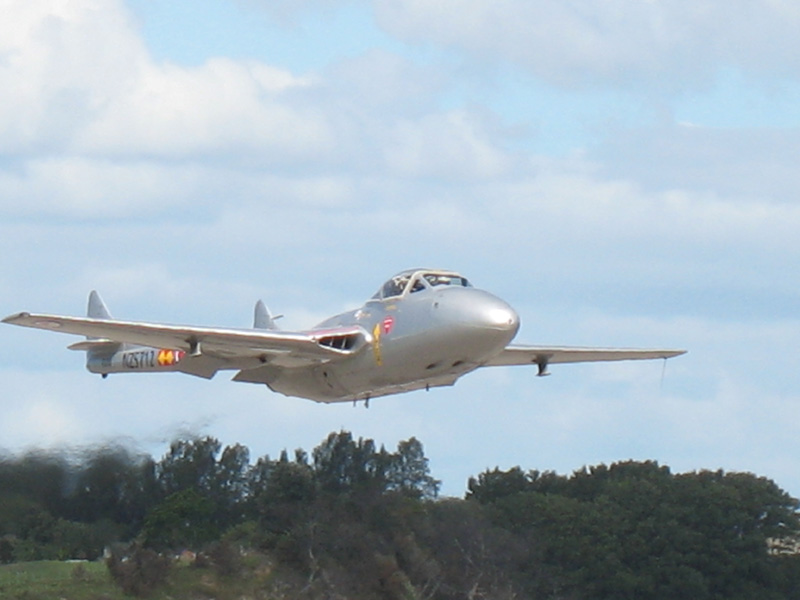
Vampire in Flight

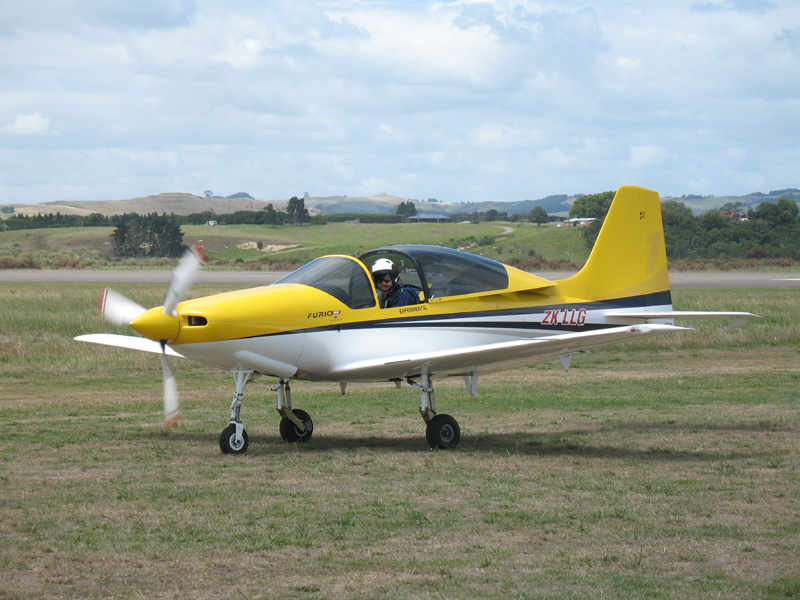
Furio Experimental Aircraft

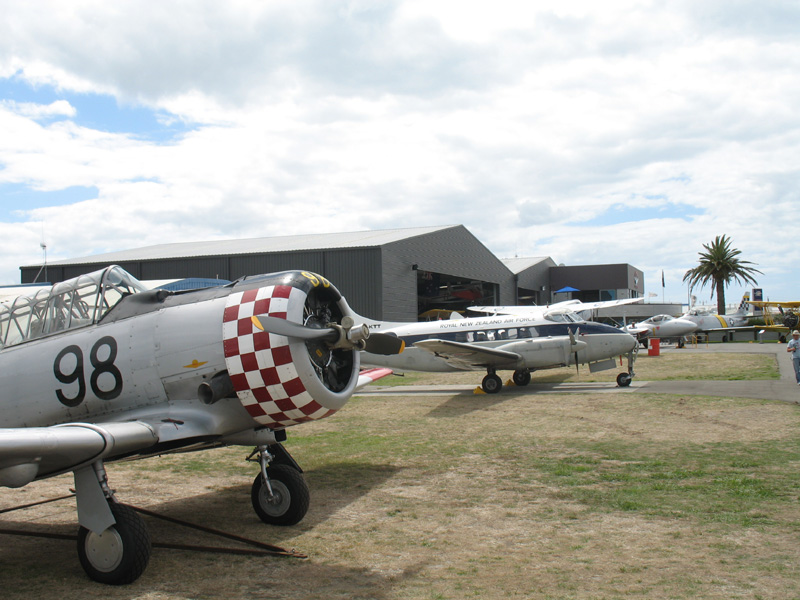
Classic Lineup

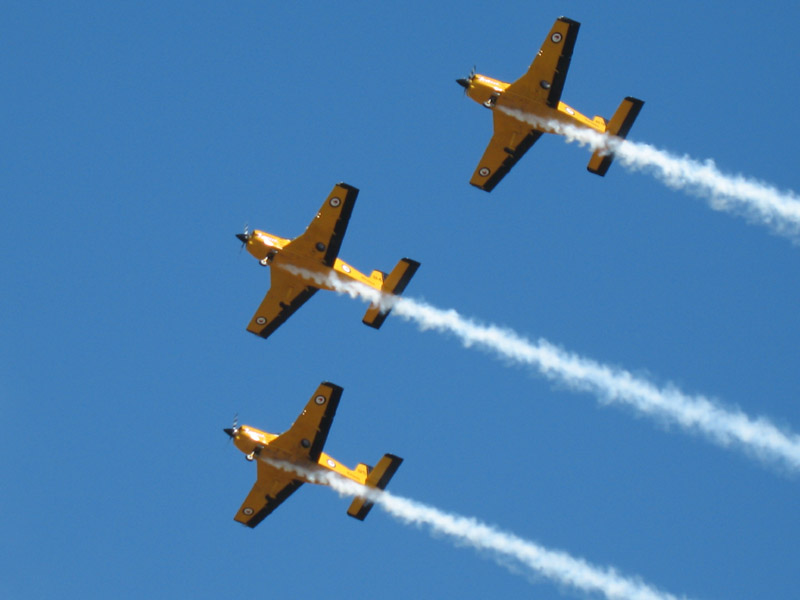
Aerobatic Display
