= Roger Walker (architect) =

New Zealand architect

Roger Walker ONZM
- Born: Roger Neville Walker; 1942 (age 83–84); Hamilton, New Zealand
- Education: University of Auckland
- Occupation: Architect
- Practice: Calder, Fowler & Styles; Walker Architecture and Design
- Buildings: Whakatāne Airport; Thorndon School

Roger Neville Walker ONZM (born 1942) is a New Zealand architect based in Wellington.

== Career ==
After graduating in architecture from the University of Auckland in the 1960s, Walker worked for the architecture firm Calder, Fowler & Styles, until he established his own practice in the early 1970s. He now runs Walker Architecture & Design in Wellington.

Like his compatriot Ian Athfield, Walker is notable for his unconventional design approach, which came out of a reaction against the then-dominant modernist architecture in the 1960s and 1970s.

Walker appeared in the 2021 TV series Designing Dreams, hosted by Matthew Ridge, in which he visited his favourite houses.

== Honours and awards ==
In the 1998 Queen's Birthday Honours, Walker was appointed an Officer of the New Zealand Order of Merit, for services to architecture. He was awarded the New Zealand Institute of Architects' highest honour, the Gold Medal, in 2016.

== Selected designs ==
- Mansell House (1st house designed in 1966), Highbury, Wellington (1968)
- Link Building, Wellington Waterfront (1969)
- Sotiri House, Highbury, Wellington (1969)
- Coleshill, (Homeworld '81) Milton Keynes (1981)
- Wellington Club (1969–1972, demolished c. 1986)

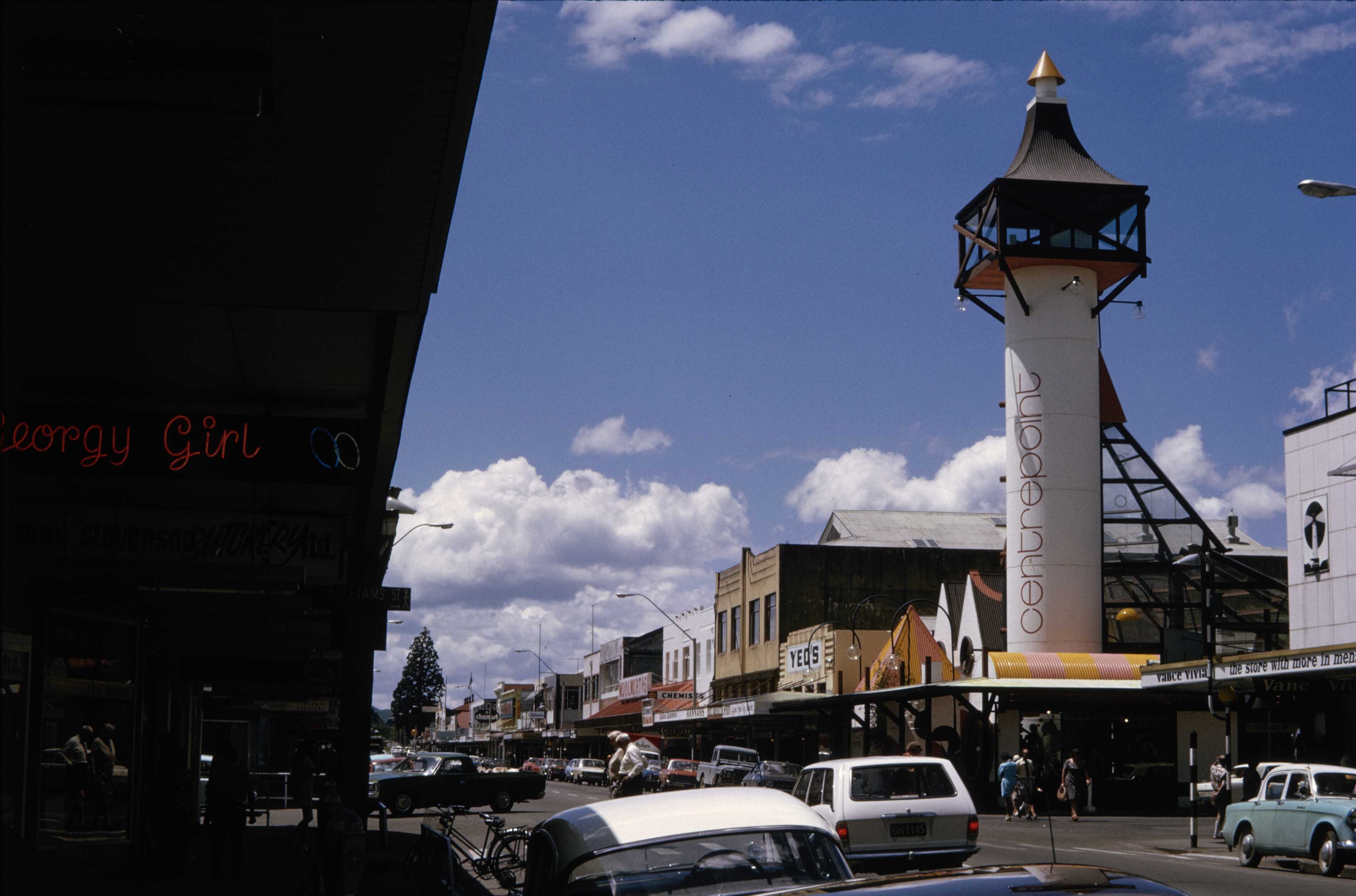
Queen Street, Masterton, in 1974, with the tower of Centrepoint Arcade

- Centrepoint Arcade, Masterton (1972, demolished 1997)

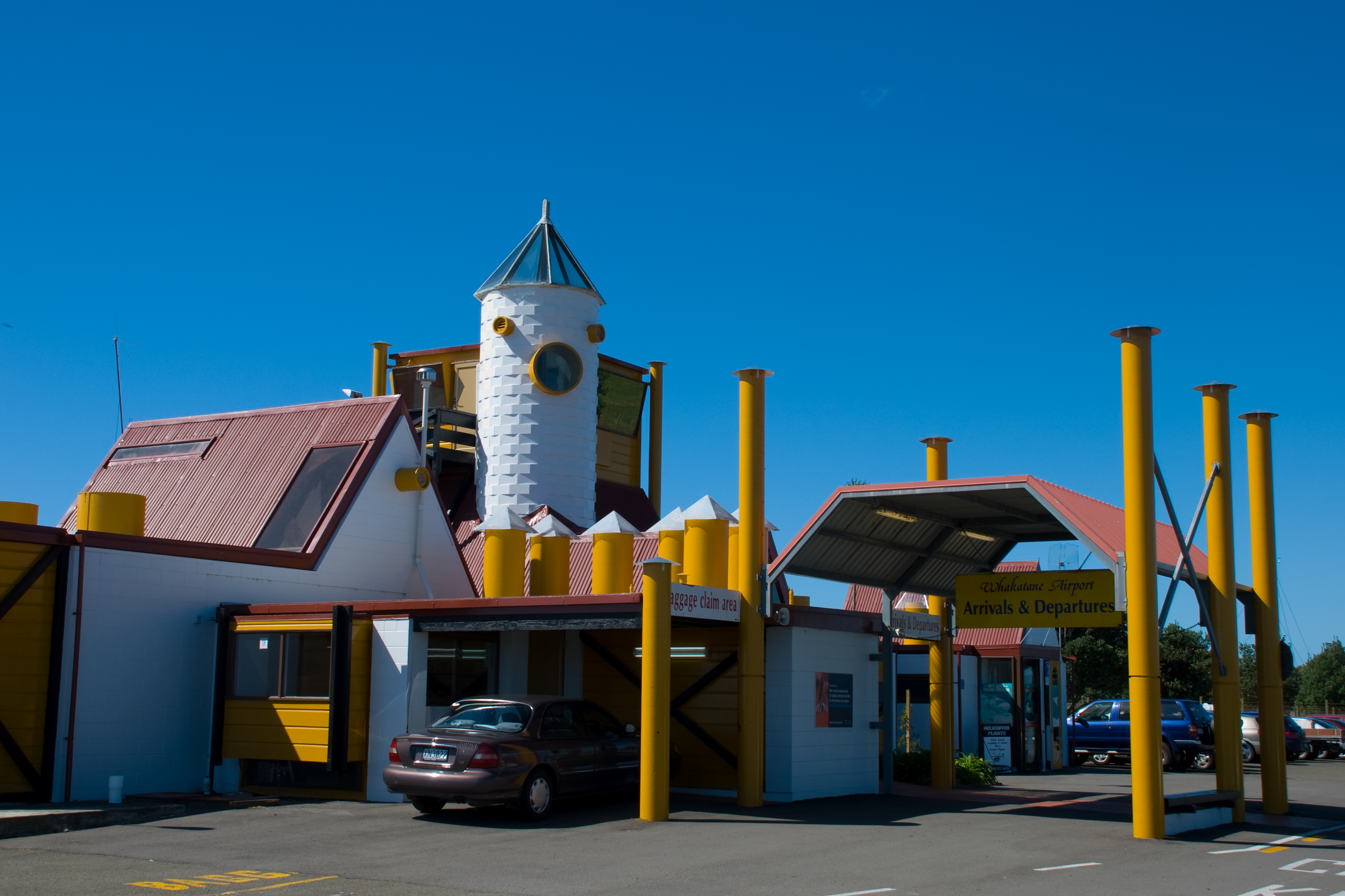
Whakatāne airport terminal

- Whakatāne Airport (1973–74)
- Cuttance House, Tirohanga, Lower Hutt
- Park Mews, Hataitai, Wellington (1974)
- Rainbow Springs Tourism Complex, Rotorua (1976–1981)
- Britten House, Seatoun, Wellington (1977)
- Willis Street Village, Wellington (1979–80)
- Ainsworth House, Korokoro, Wellington (1970s)
- Waitomo Caves Visitor Centre
- Centre City Shopping Centre, New Plymouth (1985)
- Novotel Gardens Park Royal Hotel, Queenstown (1988, formerly the THC Queenstown)
- Ropata Lodge, Lower Hutt (1990)
- Chesterman Group Offices, Hamilton (1992–93)
- Pirie St Townhouses, Mount Victoria, Wellington
- Margrain Winery and Conference Centre, Martinborough (1990s)
- Sirocco Apartments, Wellington (1999)
- Thorndon School, Wellington (c. early 2000s)
- New World Supermarket, Thorndon, Wellington
- Century City Apartments (completed mid-2009)
- The Boundary townhouse complex, Wellington
- (cancelled after the bankruptcy of developer Terry Serepisos)
- Harris House, Lake Rotoroa
- St Patrick's Church, Taumarunui
- Solitaire Lodge, Tarawera
- Wairakei Hotel Villas and recreational facilities, Taupō
- 164 The Esplanade, Island Bay
- 62 The Parade, Paekakariki

== See also ==
- Miles Warren
