= Classic Flyers Museum =

Coordinates: 37.6678°S 176.1977°E

Classic Flyers NZ
- Established: 2005
- Location: Tauranga Airport, Mount Maunganui, New Zealand
- Type: Aviation Museum
- Director: Andrew Gormlie (CEO)
- Website: www.classicflyersnz.com

The Classic Flyers Museum is an aviation museum located at the Tauranga Airport, Mount Maunganui, New Zealand, owned by a registered New Zealand charitable trust, the Bay of Plenty Classic Aircraft Trust.

The museum has a range of flying and static aircraft displays as well as a cafe.

== History ==
The museum was started in 2000 when several local businessmen, who were also aviation enthusiasts, decided to see if an existing World War II-era hangar at the Tauranga Airfield could be renovated for use. The hangar proved to be unsalvageable but the group decided to build a new facility instead and formed the Bay of Plenty Classic Aircraft Trust. The new hangar is at the entrance to the Tauranga Airport, on Jean Batten Drive, Mount Maunganui.

The founders decided to focus on creating a flying museum, as opposed to one that just had static displays, with the intention of having a high number of museum aircraft movements.

The museum was officially opened on Saturday 28 May 2005 with an air display and fly-past.

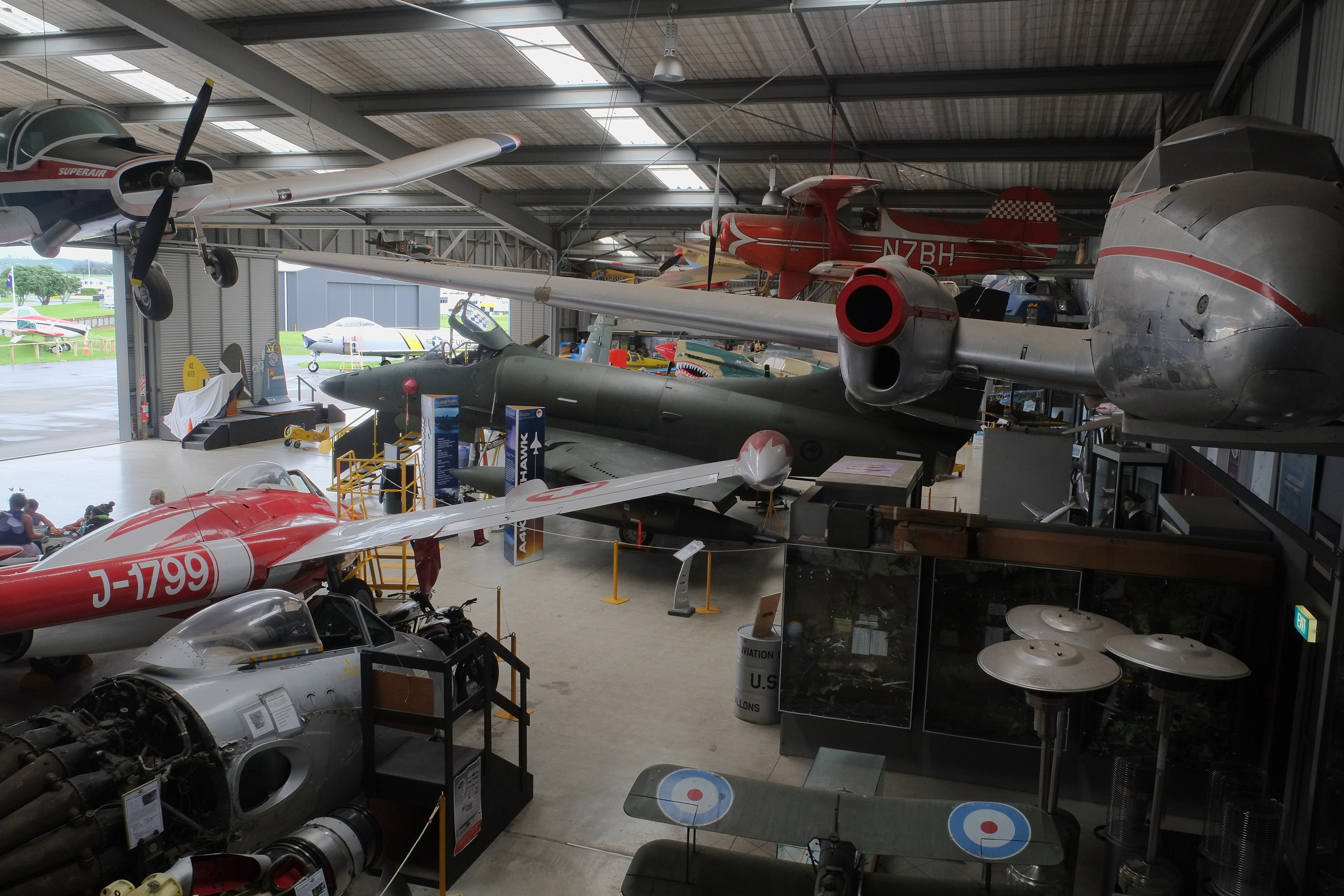
Inside the main hangar

In October 2012, the museum launched the Legacy Jet Centre and celebrated the arrival of an Aermacchi aircraft to be restored. In recognition of funding from the Legacy Trust, the main hangar was named "The Legacy Jet Centre".

Currently, the museum is spread across three adjacent hangars, the first of which houses the visitor centre, Avgas Cafe, event spaces, and most of the museum exhibits, while the other two accommodate the bulk of the classic aircraft in working flying condition, and the museum archives.

Additional airplanes are on display outside the hangars. One of them is an old New Zealand National Airways Corporation DH-Heron, which is open to the public, but not in airworthy condition.

== Aims ==
The museum aims are:

- Preserve classic and historic aircraft
- Support the retention of New Zealand’s aviation history

The Trust focuses on preserving aircraft and memorabilia that has a connection to the Bay of Plenty area or New Zealand generally.

== Collection ==
The museum aircraft collection includes:

- Aermacchi MB-339
- Boeing Stearman
- Cessna 188 AGwagon
- Consolidated PBY-5A Catalina (fuselage)
- Curtiss P-40E Kittyhawk
- de Havilland DH 104 Devon C.1
- de Havilland DH 114 Heron
- de Havilland Vampire
- de Havilland DH 112 Venom
- Douglas A-4K Skyhawk
- EEL ULF 1 ultralight glider
- Fletcher FU24
- Grumman TBF-1C Avenger
- Hall Cherokee II glider
- Hawker Hunter T75
- Hughes 300
- North American Harvard
- North American F-86 Sabre
- Pacific Aerospace Corporation CT-4B Airtrainer
- Pitts Special S-1C
- Schleicher Ka-6CR glider
- Slingsby T-45 Swallow glider
- Supermarine Spitfire Mk V - replica
- Victa Airtourer T-3A
- Yakovlev Yak 52
