= New Zealand School of Tourism =

The New Zealand School of Tourism (NZST) is a private tertiary education provider specialising in travel and tourism training. It was founded in 1985 as Travel Careers & Training in Wellington and expanded to become New Zealand's largest private institution in its sector. It offers certificate and diploma programmes in areas such as tourism management, airline cabin crew training, and hotel operations.

== History ==
New Zealand School of Tourism was founded in 1985 as Travel Careers & Training in Wellington with its first campus. The school opened a second campus in Auckland a few years later and, in 2006, it acquired the Sir George Seymour National College of Airline Travel and Tourism, bringing its total number of campuses to seven. It adopted the New Zealand School of Tourism name following the acquisition to unify branding and is now New Zealand's largest private education provider focused on training programmes for the travel and tourism industry.

NZST opened a campus in Dunedin in 2017. In 2019, a couch caught on fire at the campus, requiring firefighters to rescue a person from the building's roof and resulting in three people being treated for smoke inhalation. The campus was later closed in 2022.

Also in 2022, the school disclosed that it saw a 25 per cent increase in enrollments for 2023.

== Campuses ==
As of 2020, the New Zealand School of Tourism had seven campuses throughout the country with 1560 full-time students. Following the closure of campuses in Dunedin and Rotorua in 2022, the school now lists five campuses located in the Auckland CBD, Auckland Airport, Hamilton, Wellington, and Christchurch. The Auckland Airport campus is its flagship and has a Boeing 747 service trainer, a full Boeing 737 aircraft cabin trainer, and an Airbus A320 cabin trainer. It is a subsidiary of UP Education, which also operates Yoobee Colleges, Elite School of Beauty and Spa, Cut Above Academy, and the Healthcare Academy of New Zealand.
