= Whakatāne Airport =

Whakatāne Airport Papa Rererangi i Whakatāne
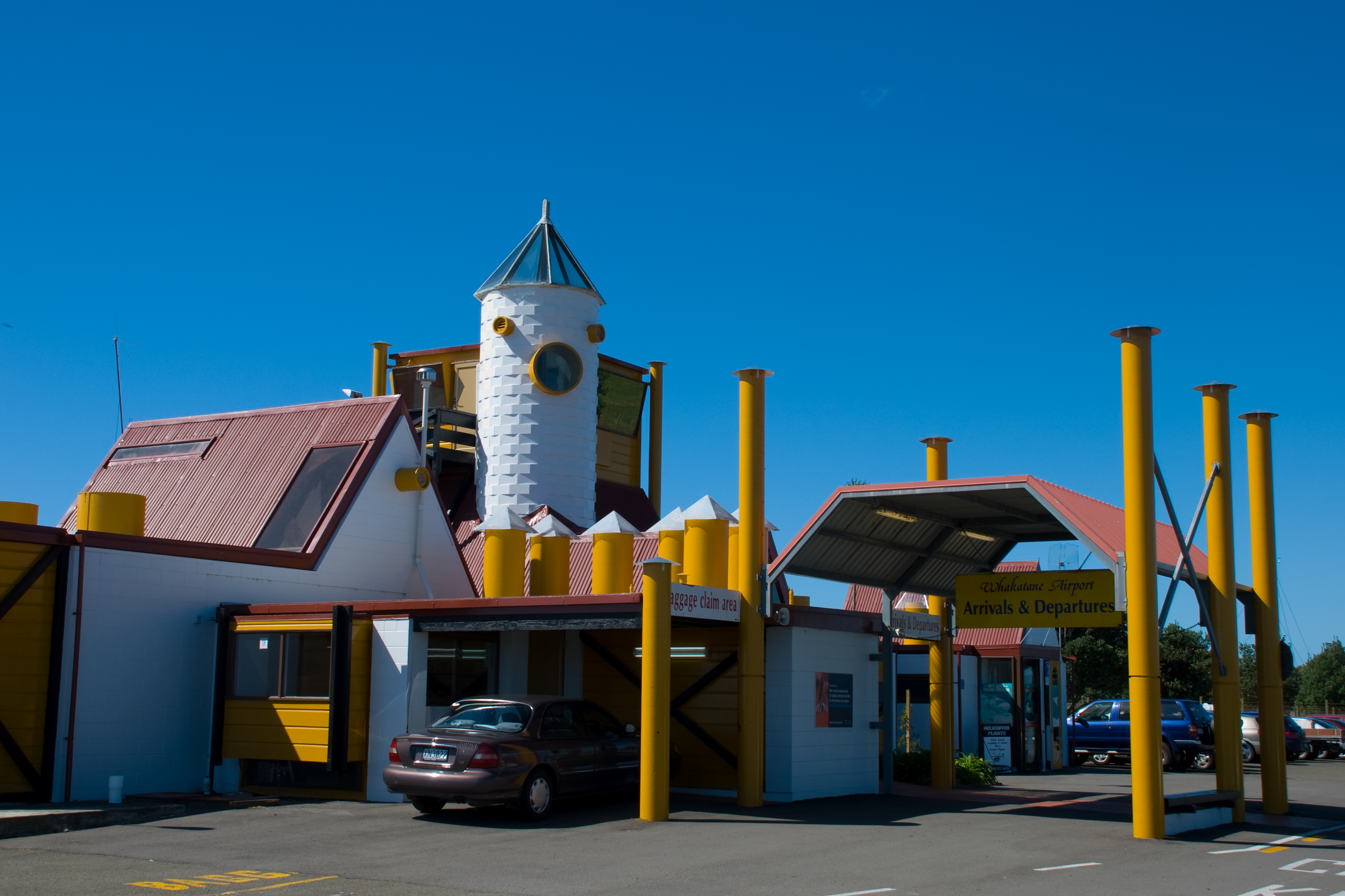
- Whakatāne airport terminal
- IATA: WHK; ICAO: NZWK

Summary
- Location: Whakatāne, New Zealand
- Elevation AMSL: 20 ft (6.1 m)
- Coordinates: 37°55′14″S 176°54′51″E

Map
- Location of airport in New Zealand

Runways
Direction	Length		Surface
Direction	ft	m	Surface
09R/27L	2,461	750	Grass
09L/27R	4,200	1,280	Asphalt
- Source: World Aero Data

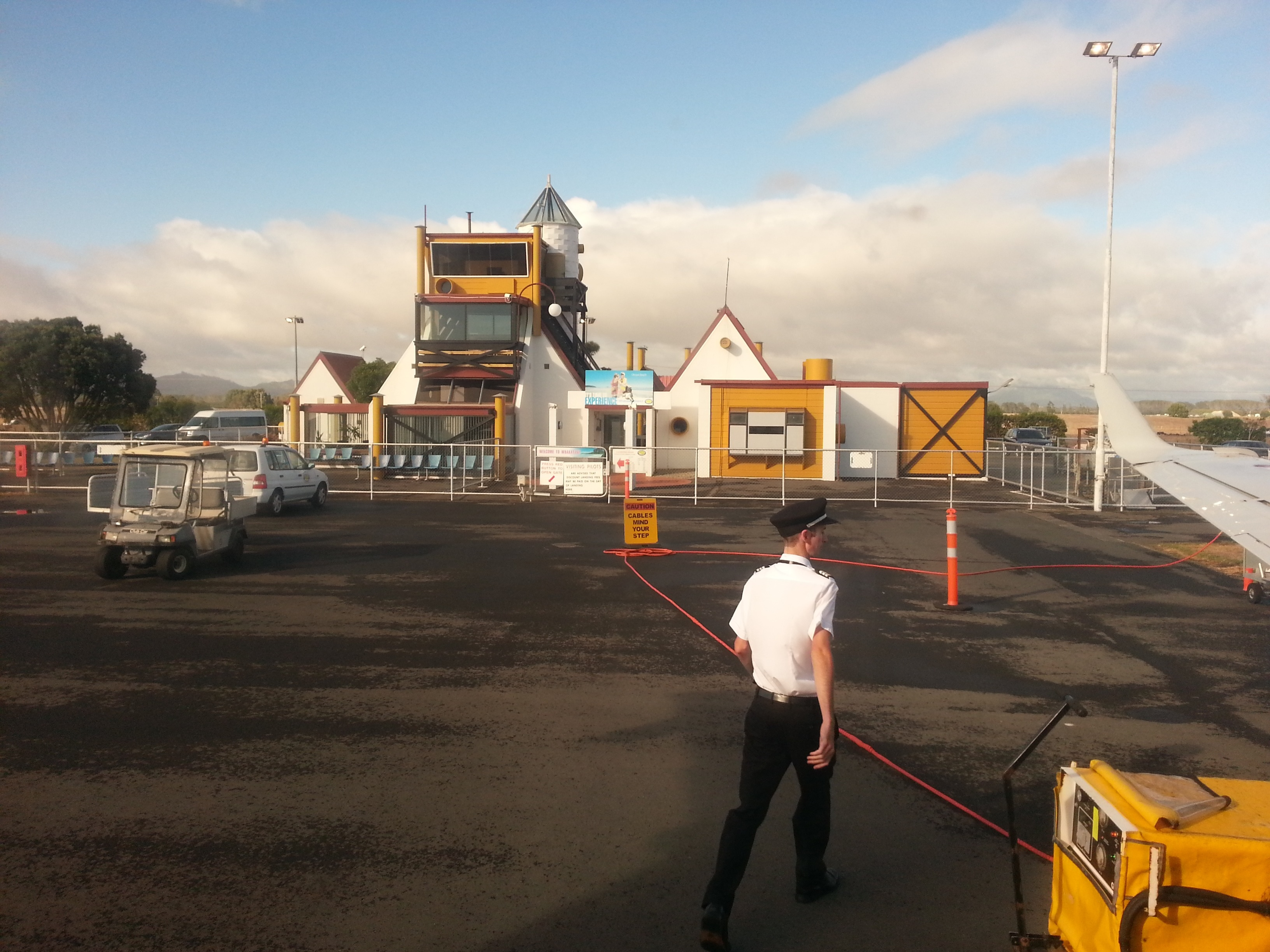
Whakatāne Airport terminal

Whakatāne Airport (IATA: WHK, ICAO: NZWK) is an airport serving the town of Whakatāne, the eastern Bay of Plenty and the tourist attraction of Mount Tarawera, in New Zealand.

== History ==
The airport opened on 24 January 1963 with a new sealed runway and a construction cost of 50,000 pounds. The "excitingly different" terminal building was designed by Roger Walker and completed in 1974. In 2019, Heritage New Zealand listed the airport terminal as a Category I Historic Place. The 90-m runway end safety areas were being extended to 240 m in 2018 to allow larger aircraft such as Saab 340 to land.

Air Chathams operates daily flights to Auckland. They previously used a Metroliner, and have also used a Saab 340 since 29 November 2019. Sunair operates from Hamilton, Gisborne and Napier.

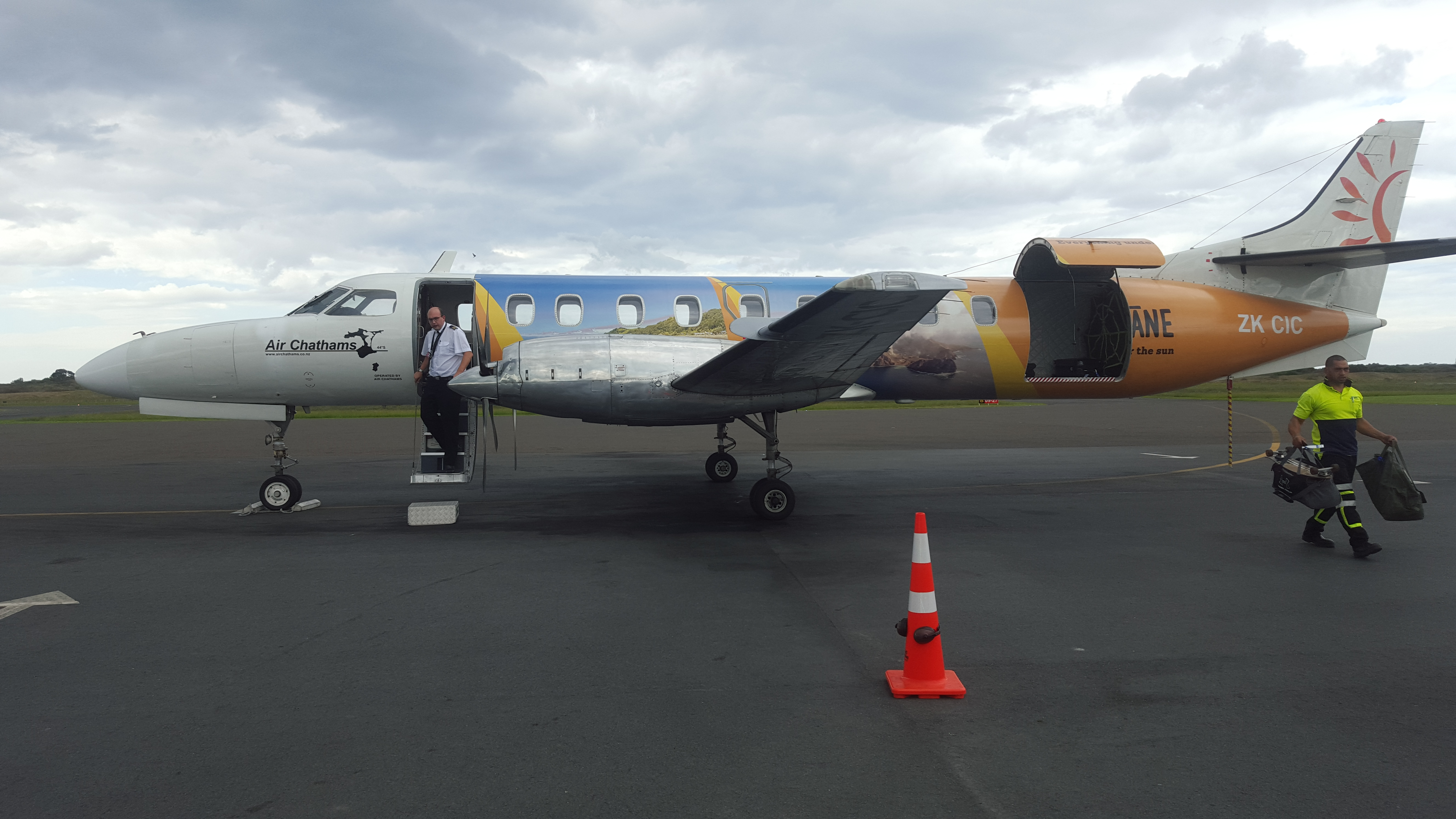
Colourful Air Chathams Fairchild Metroliner on the tarmac at Whakatāne. The aircraft was used exclusively for a scheduled service between Whakatāne and Auckland.

The airport houses a flight school, agricultural aircraft, fixed wing tourist flights and commercial helicopter operations.

== Airlines and destinations ==
Airlines	Destinations
Air Chathams	Auckland
Sunair	Gisborne, Hamilton, Napier

== See also ==
- List of airports in New Zealand
- List of airlines of New Zealand
