= Yoobee Colleges =

New Zealand private university

- Established: 1994
- Parent institution: UP Education
- Location: Auckland, Wellington, and Christchurch, New Zealand
- Website: www.yoobee.ac.nz

Yoobee Colleges is a tertiary education company in New Zealand. It was founded in 1994. The company was formed in its present form in 2019 after the merger of South Seas Film & Television School, Animation College, Yoobee School of Design, AMES – The Institute of IT, and Design & Arts (Canterbury).

In addition to providers operating under the Yoobee branding, the company also operates the New Zealand School of Tourism, the Healthcare Academy of New Zealand, Cut Above Academy, and Elite School of Beauty and Spa. Yoobee is New Zealand’s largest specialised creative and IT provider offering a range of programs in Animation and game development, cybersecurity and IT, Graphic and web design, marketing and film and TV production.

== History ==
Natcoll Design Technology was founded in 1994. In 2007, Natcoll Design Technology was purchased by Renaissance, a New Zealand corporation which operated a number of lines of business under the "YOOBEE" branding. The school was renamed Yoobee at Natcoll Design School as part of a transition to become the Yoobee School of Design. The renaming was complete in 2012. In the early 2000s, Yoobee Colleges' parent Renaissance experienced difficulties as changes in business strategy by Apple affected their core retail business. In 2014, Renaissance shareholders voted to sell Yoobee School of Design to Academic Colleges Group for $13.3 million, with an additional potential earn-out of up to $1 million. Due to low profit, the additional earn out was not realised.

In 2011, the Natcoll Design Technology campus in Christchurch was damaged by an earthquake with students transferring to campuses in Auckland and Wellington. It has collaborated on jointly offered course offerings with the Whitehouse Institute of Design in Australia. In 2018, the Yoobee School of Design moved back into a campus in central Christchurch marking its return to the city after the 2011 earthquake and sharing facilities with the University of Canterbury. In 2019, Yoobee Colleges was created by the merger of South Seas Film and Television School, Animation College, Design and Arts (Canterbury), AMES – The Institute of IT, and the Yoobee School of Design under the unified brand forming New Zealand’s largest specialised creative and information technology provider. Also in 2019, its parent company was spun out of ACG as UP Education.

As of 2023, a $2 million facility at the Healthcare Academy of New Zealand, owned by Yoobee Colleges, has been unused as the school worked towards accreditation of its nursing program.

Graduates from the college includes two of the creators of the TV series Bluey.

== Schools and campuses ==
Yoobee has campuses in four physical locations in three major cities in New Zealand, Auckland, Wellington, and Christchurch. Yoobee also offers online courses and blended campus offerings.
