= Tauranga Airport =

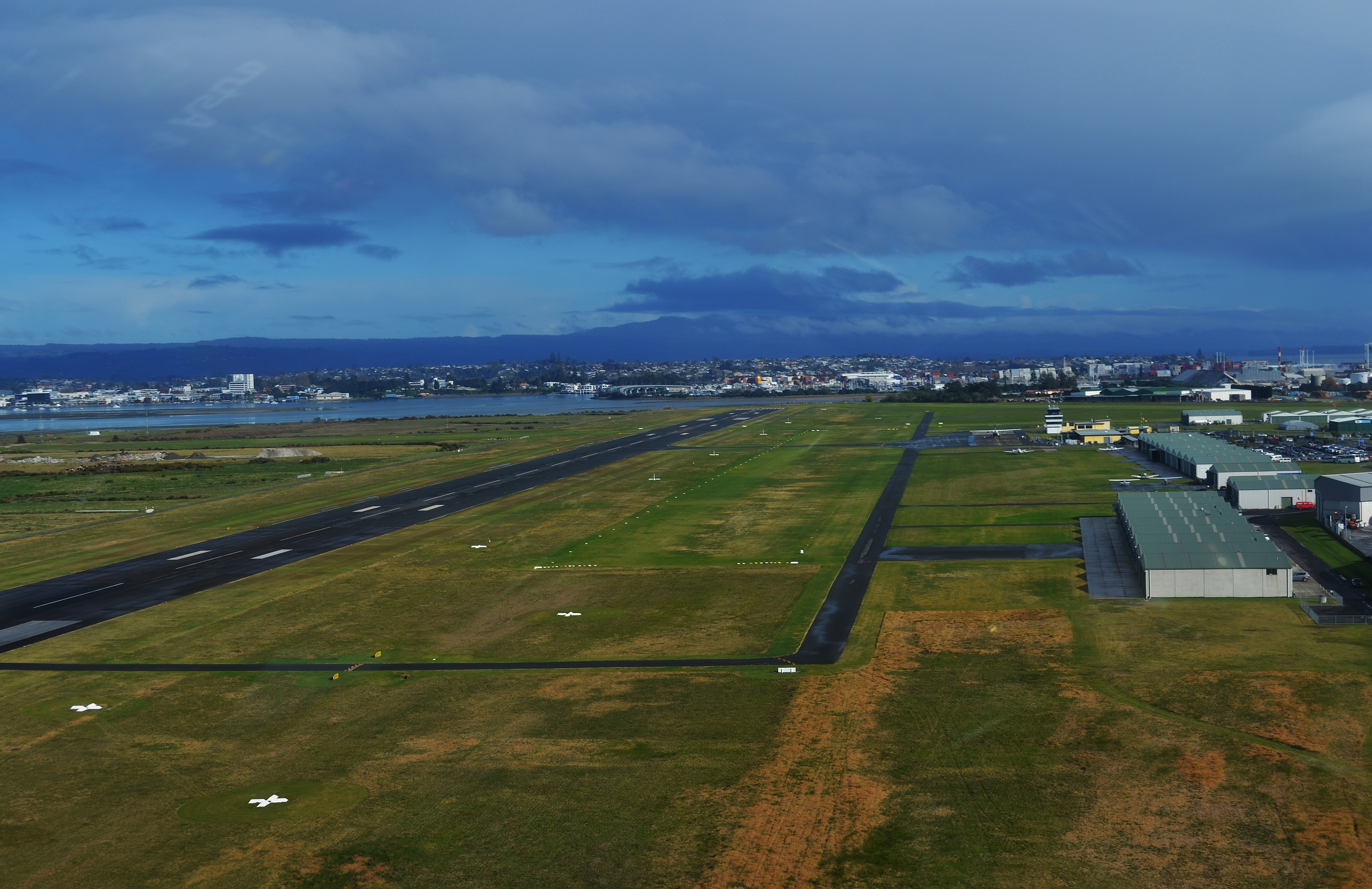
- Aerial view of Tauranga Airport (2015)
- IATA: TRG; ICAO: NZTG

Summary
- Airport type: Public
- Operator: Tauranga Airport Authority
- Location: Tauranga
- Elevation AMSL: 13 ft (4.0 m)
- Coordinates: 037°40′24″S 176°11′50″E
- Website: http://taurangacityairport.co.nz/

Map
- Location of airport in North Island

Runways
Direction	Length		Surface
Direction	ft	m	Surface
07/25	5,988	1,825	Asphalt
07/25	2,526	770	Grass
04/22	2,100	640	Grass
16/34	2,296	700	Grass

Statistics (2017)
- Total passengers: 350,085
- Aircraft movements: 58,448

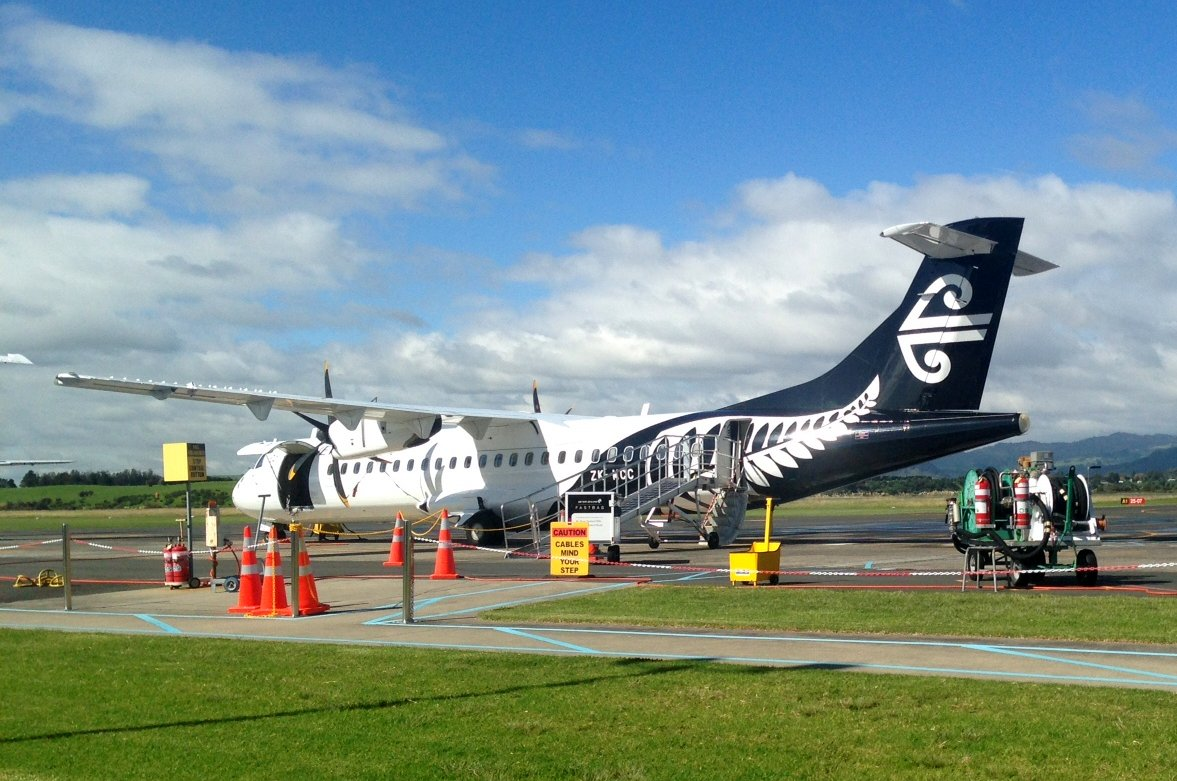
Air New Zealand ATR72 at Tauranga Airport in 2016

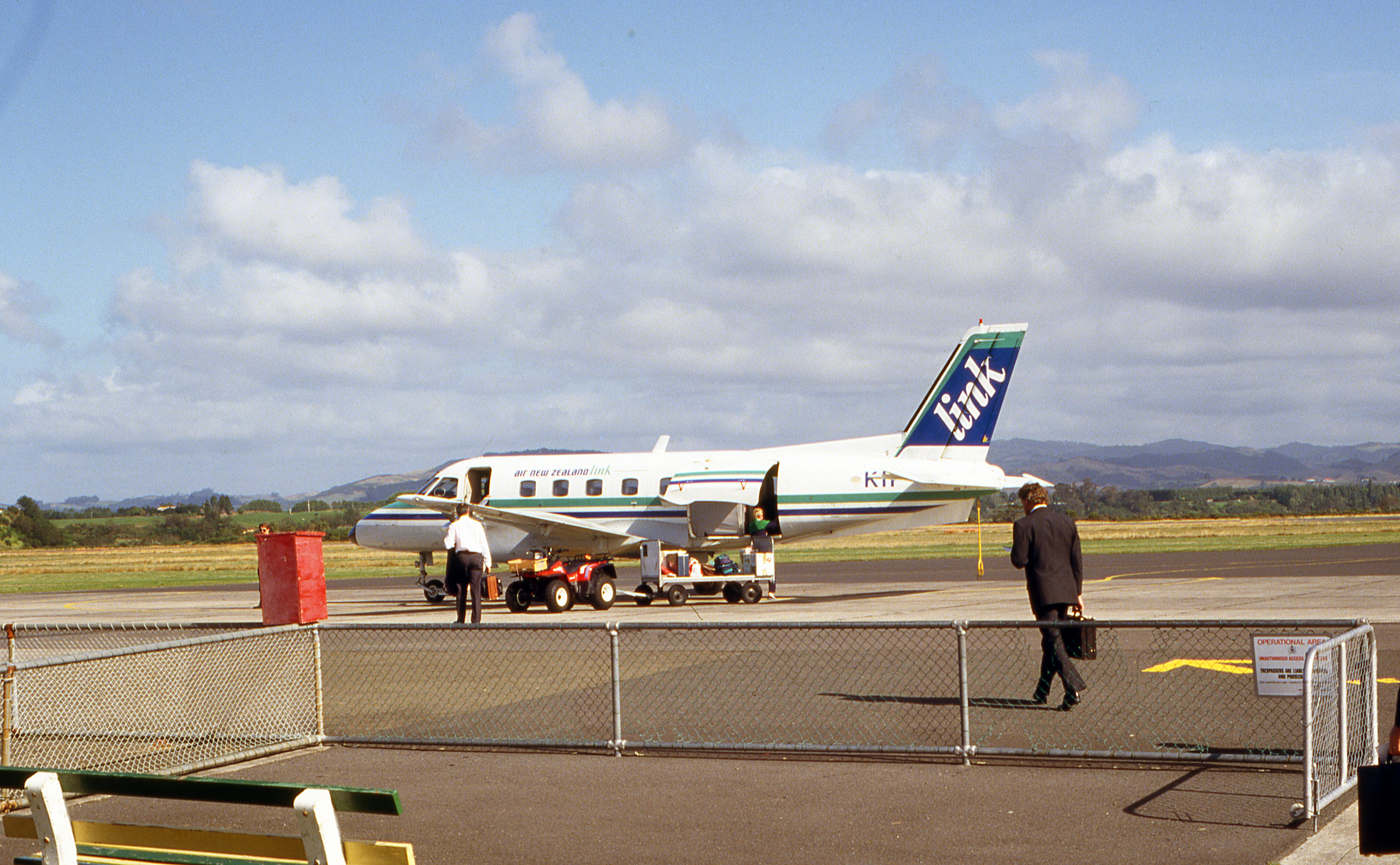
Air New Zealand Link Embraer 110 at Tauranga Airport (1993)

Tauranga Airport (IATA: TRG, ICAO: NZTG) is an airport serving the city of Tauranga, New Zealand. It is located adjacent to Tauranga Harbour in the suburb of Mount Maunganui, approximately 3 km northeast of Tauranga CBD. The terminal is located to the north of the runway, on Jean Batten Drive, and consists of a two-storey building with four tarmac gates. Air New Zealand serves the airport, with flights to Auckland, Wellington and Christchurch. A further two regional airlines also operate to the airport, as well as scenic and charter flights, skydiving operations and general aviation.

== History ==
In 1935, the Tauranga Aero Club leased land adjacent to Tauranga Harbour in Mount Maunganui to establish an aerodrome. Up until then, the only airfield serving the town was a runway on the eastern side of the Waikareao Estuary which was only usable during low tide, and it was deemed that a permanent facility was going to be necessary in order to cater for growing demand in the region. The airport opened in 1939 to great celebrations and, later the same year, it was taken over by the Royal New Zealand Air Force, due to the onset of World War II. During the period of military use, the runways were extended and a hangar was constructed, and the airport was predominantly used as a training station for pilots. The airport was returned to the Tauranga Aero Club in 1945, and in 1946 the club began passenger flights from Tauranga to Mōtītī Island, and later added flights to Matakana Island. In 1947, the New Zealand National Airways Corporation, commonly known as NAC, began passenger flights to the airport.

From June 1966 until August 1967, the main runway was closed for sealing and throughout this period larger aircraft, including those operated by NAC, were unable to serve the airport. During the closure, Adastra Aviation operated fights from Tauranga to Auckland and Rotorua using aircraft small enough to use the secondary runways. When the sealing work was completed in August 1967, NAC flew Fokker Friendship aircraft to Tauranga for the first time. In 1978, Air New Zealand took over passenger services to the airport, after merging with NAC.

In 1998, the airport, now under the ownership of the Tauranga District Council, extended its runway to the east to reach its current length of 1,825m. In the following years, the terminal was enlarged and upgraded, with a second storey added containing a Koru Club regional lounge and a conference room.

In March 2000, Origin Pacific Airways commenced flights between Tauranga and Auckland with 19-seat BAE Jetstream 32 aircraft. From September 2002, following several reductions in frequency, this service was replaced by flights to Hamilton, where passengers could connect to other Origin Pacific Airways flights to destinations including Auckland and Wellington. Eventually this service too was cut; but in June 2006, Origin Pacific Airways returned to Tauranga with services to Christchurch with 28-seat BAE Jetstream 41 aircraft. This was the airport's first regular non-stop flight to the South Island, but it ceased two months after its commencement, in August 2006, when Origin Pacific Airways ended its passenger services.

In October 2007, Air New Zealand launched flights to Christchurch, operated by its subsidiary Air Nelson, to supplement its existing flights to Auckland and Wellington which were operated by both Air Nelson and Eagle Airways. Those subsidiaries were operated by 50-seat Bombardier Q300 and 19-seat Beech 1900D aircraft. Air New Zealand used to operate 33-seat Saab 340A aircraft from Auckland and Wellington but then the Saab 340A was replaced by the Bombardier Q300.

In 2010, the airport undertook a further expansion of the terminal which took 6 months, and included larger check in and baggage claim areas as well as an expansion of the terminal by 830 square metres. The apron was also expanded to allow a fourth parking spot for overnight aircraft. In January 2013, Air New Zealand started using its subsidiary Mount Cook Airlines, which operates 68 seat ATR 72 aircraft on selected flights. During 2016, the short lived Kiwi Regional Airlines served Tauranga from Dunedin via Nelson with 34-seat Saab 340A aircraft.

In June 2022, Barrier Air announced a new air service from Tauranga to Great Barrier Island which commenced in December; the route is operated using a Cessna Grand Caravan airplane.

== Operations ==
Air New Zealand is the major operator and serves the airport through its regional subsidiaries Mount Cook Airline and Air Nelson using ATR 72 and Bombardier Q300 aircraft respectively. Currently there are up to nine daily flights to Auckland, five daily flights to Wellington and three daily flights to Christchurch all operated under the Air New Zealand Link brand. Barrier Air also operates from Tauranga to Claris on Great Barrier Island with a Cessna Grand Caravan.

Tauranga Airport is also the hub for regional airline Sunair. It operates scheduled flights to Claris, Whangarei, Gisborne, Napier and Whitianga with its 3-seat Cessna 172 Skyhawk and 5-seat Piper PA23 Aztec aircraft.

There are several scenic and charter airlines based at the airport as well as extensive skydiving, glider and helicopter operations. The airport is home to a large number of general aviation aircraft, the majority of which is stored in hangars to the east and northwest of the terminal.

As of 2017, Tauranga Airport is the tenth busiest airport in New Zealand based on passenger traffic and the fifth busiest airport in New Zealand based on aircraft movements. It is the busiest airport in the Bay of Plenty region in terms of both passenger traffic and aircraft movements.

Tauranga Airport has been the host of the biennial Sportavex fly-in and airshow since 2004. From 2010 this became part of a larger event, the Tauranga City Airshow, which is run by the local Classic Flyers museum and is also known as Classics of the Sky.

== Replacement airport ==
In 2006, a feasibility study was conducted to investigate the possibility of building a new airport at Paengaroa or Pyes Pa, serving both Tauranga and Rotorua, in an attempt to attract more services to the region, including international flights. However, it was determined that Tauranga Airport had yet to reach full operational capacity, and the cost and inconvenient location of a potential new airport meant that the idea was dropped.

== Airlines and destinations ==
Airlines	Destinations
Air New Zealand	Auckland, Christchurch, Wellington
Barrier Air	Claris
Sunair	Claris, Gisborne, Mōtītī Island, Napier, Whangarei, Whitianga

== Passenger numbers ==
Annual passenger traffic and aircraft movements at Tauranga Airport
Year	Passengers	Aircraft movements
2016	292,998	65,628
2015	285,992	60,624
2014	273,857	58,448
2013	261,265	70,450
2012	248,519	72,652
2011	246,485	74,400
2010	238,398	86,935
2009	203,138	97,144
2008	199,468	105,992
2007	185,711	97,631
2006	170,311	94,207
2005	153,359	85,010
2004	141,924	77,521

== See also ==
- List of airports in New Zealand
- List of airlines of New Zealand
- Transport in New Zealand
