= Auckland International Airport Limited =

New Zealand airport operating company

- Type: Public company
- Traded as: NZX: AIA; ASX: AIA; S&P/NZX 50 component
- ISIN: NZAIAE0002S6
- Industry: Aviation
- Founded: 1988
- Founder: Government of New Zealand
- Headquarters: Auckland, New Zealand
- Key people: Julia Hoare (Chairman); Carrie Hurihanganui (CEO)
- Revenue: ▲NZ$895.5 million (FY 2024)
- Operating income: ▲NZ$276.6 million (FY 2024)
- Net income: ▲NZ$5.5 million (FY 2024)
- Subsidiaries: Auckland Airport; Queenstown Airport
- Website: corporate.aucklandairport.co.nz
- Footnotes; Ownership reference

Auckland International Airport Limited (AIA) is a dual listed company with listings on the New Zealand Exchange and Australian Securities Exchange that is the owner and operator of Auckland Airport and a major stakeholder in Queenstown Airport.

== Founding and ownership ==
AIA was formed in 1988, when the Government of New Zealand corporatised the Auckland Airport. It had previously been run by the Auckland Regional Authority, covering the five councils in the Auckland region.

The government was AIA's majority shareholder, the rest being held by the local councils at founding. In 1998 the government sold its shareholding, and AIA became the fifth airport company in the world to be publicly listed. At that time the major shareholders were Auckland City Council (25.8 per cent), Manukau City Council (9.6 per cent) and North Shore City Council (7.1 per cent). North Shore City Council sold its shares in 1999 and Auckland City Council sold its share down to 12.8 per cent in 2002. After amalgamation into the Auckland Council, the local authority owned a 22.4 per cent stake worth $1.13 billion as of May 2014. As at 2024, Auckland Council held an 11.1 per cent stake, but it sold the remainder in December 2024.

AIA is a dual listed company with listings on the New Zealand Exchange and Australian Securities Exchange.

== Revenue ==
AIA enjoys diverse revenue streams, and operates a 'dual-till' approach, whereby its finances are split into aeronautical and non-aeronautical balance sheets. Aeronautical income is derived from airfield charges, terminal services charge and the airport development charge (or departure fee). Non-aeronautical revenue comes from its significant property portfolio, car park, and retail income. Due to the airport having little-to-no competition, the aeronautical side of the business is subject to information disclosure requirements as set by the Commerce Commission. Income from the non-aeronautical side of the business accounts for just over half of its revenue. The airport has been criticised by airlines, led by Air New Zealand, for its purportedly high landing charges. Research conducted in September 2010 by aviation consultants Jacobs, however, indicates that Auckland Airport international charges are slightly below the average of the 20 largest international airports flown by Air New Zealand.

The diversity in revenue was of benefit during the downturn in international aviation following the events of 11 September 2001, and subsequently the 2002 Bali bombings, SARS outbreak and the Iraq War. The airport was able to rely on steady income from the non-aeronautical side of the business, which softened the blow of international events.

In July 2009 Auckland Airport elected to delay a scheduled increase in its landing charges from 1 July 2009 to assist its airline customers during the recession. The scheduled increase was put in place on 1 March 2010. The company has in the past reportedly been singled out by airline lobby group IATA for its consistent excessive level of profits. Airlines such as Air New Zealand complain of excessive landing charges. On 5 June 2007, the airport's 60 per cent profit margin was criticised by IATA director general and CEO Giovanni Bisignani. He said the airport had a "happy monopoly" and that IATA would ask the New Zealand government to investigate.

Until July 2008, AIA charged all departing international passengers (12 years old or older) a $25 departure fee. This has been replaced with a passenger services charge levied on the airlines for each arriving and departing international passenger. This charge has commenced at $13 and was planned to rise by 50 cents a year for two years to $14. In 2012, Auckland Airport envisaged to cut the international passenger fee and hike the domestic travellers charges in FY-2013.

== Partnership with Queenstown Airport ==
On 8 July 2010, AIA announced it had entered into an agreement to take a 24.99 per cent shareholding in Queenstown Airport Corporation Limited, the operator of Queenstown Airport, and form a strategic alliance between the two airports. The shareholding will cost NZ$27.7 million, through the issue of new shares. The alliance is expected to generate an extra 176,000 passengers through Queenstown Airport. AIA has an option to increase its shareholding in Queenstown Airport to 30–35 per cent at any time up to 30 June 2011, subject to the approval of the Queenstown Lakes District Council. The new share capital from would allow Queenstown Airport to fund growth of the airport's operating capacity and to pay regular dividends back to the community via the Queenstown Lakes District Council shareholding.

== Investments ==
In January 2010 AIA purchased a 25% shareholding in North Queensland Airports that owned Cairns and Mackay airports in Australia. In March 2018 the shareholding was sold.
