= Auckland Airport =

International airport serving Auckland, New Zealand

Auckland Airport Taunga Rererangi o Tāmaki-Makaurau

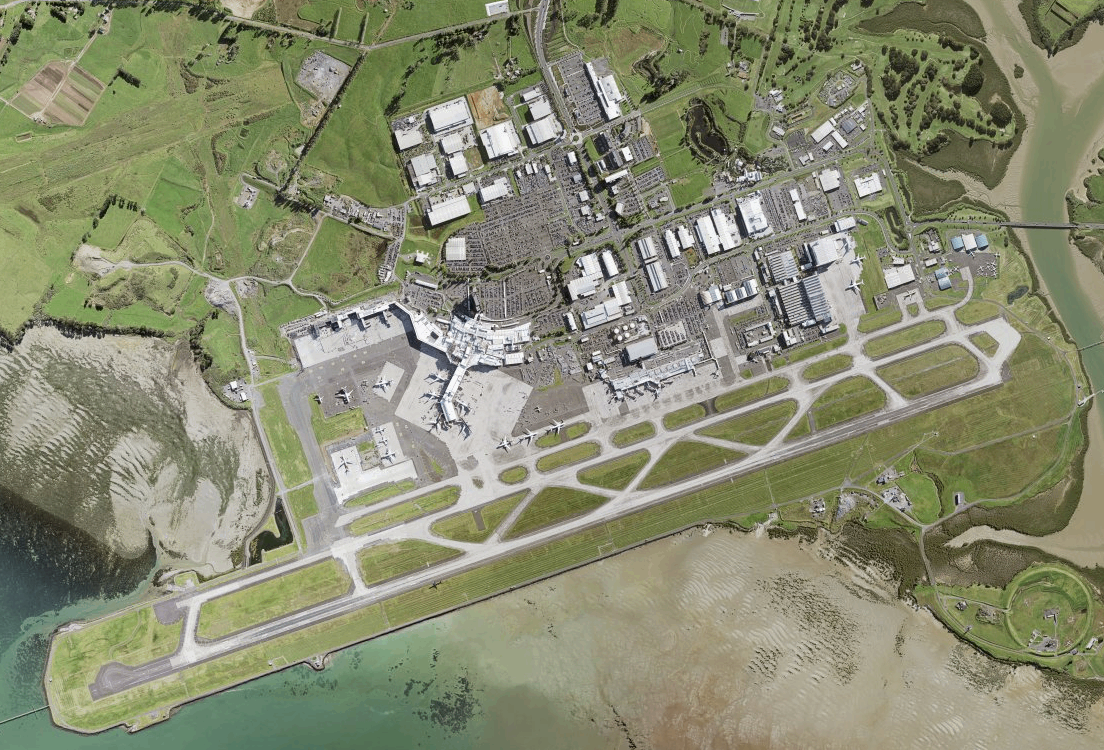
- Satellite view of the airport in 2017
- IATA: AKL; ICAO: NZAA; WMO: 93110

Summary
- Airport type: Public
- Owner/Operator: Auckland International Airport Limited (AIAL)
- Serves: Auckland
- Location: Ray Emery Drive, Māngere, Auckland, New Zealand
- Opened: 29 January 1966; 60 years ago
- Hub for: Air New Zealand
- Focus city for: ASL Airlines Australia
- Operating base for: Air Chathams; Barrier Air; Jetstar
- Time zone: NZST (UTC+12:00)
  - Summer (DST): NZDT (UTC+13:00)
- Elevation AMSL: 7 m (23 ft)
- Coordinates: 37°00′29″S 174°47′30″E
- Website: aucklandairport.co.nz

Maps
- Location of airport in New Zealand AKL/NZAA (New Zealand) AKL/NZAA (Oceania)

Runways
| Direction | Length | | Surface |
| Direction | ft | m | Surface |
|---|---|---|---|
| 05L/23R | 9,652 | 2,525 | Planned |
| 05R/23L | 11,926 | 3,635 | Concrete |

Statistics (2025)
- Passengers (CY 2025): 18,914,025
- Aircraft movements (CY 2025): 158,464
- Economic impact (2014): $5.4 billion
- Source: WAD

Auckland Airport (IATA: AKL, ICAO: NZAA) is an international airport serving Auckland, the most populous city in New Zealand. It is the largest and busiest airport in the country, handling almost 19 million passengers in the calendar year 2025, including 8.5 million domestic, and 10.4 million international. The airport is operated by Auckland International Airport Limited and is located near Māngere, a residential suburb, and Airport Oaks, a service-hub suburb 21 kilometres (13 mi) south of the Auckland city centre. It serves as the principal hub for Air New Zealand, and the New Zealand operating base for Jetstar.

The airport is one of New Zealand's most important infrastructure assets, providing several thousand jobs for the region. It handled 71 per cent of the country's international air passenger arrivals and departures in 2000. It is one of only two commercial airports in New Zealand that can handle Airbus A380 jet aircraft (the other being Christchurch).

The airport has a single 3,635 m (11,926 ft) runway, 05R/23L, which is Cat IIIb capable (at a reduced rate of movements) in the 23L direction. It has a capacity of about 45 flight movements per hour, and is currently the busiest single-runway airport in Oceania. In November 2007 work began on a new northern runway, to be built in several stages and to be used mainly by smaller aircraft, freeing up capacity on the main runway. The project has been repeatedly delayed and is now expected to be completed in 2038, a delay of more than a decade.

The airport covers 1,500 hectares (5.8 sq. miles). At present, the airport has an international and a domestic terminal. In 2023, AIAL announced plans for all jet services to operate from a single expanded terminal, with turboprop services continuing to use the existing domestic facility.

== History ==
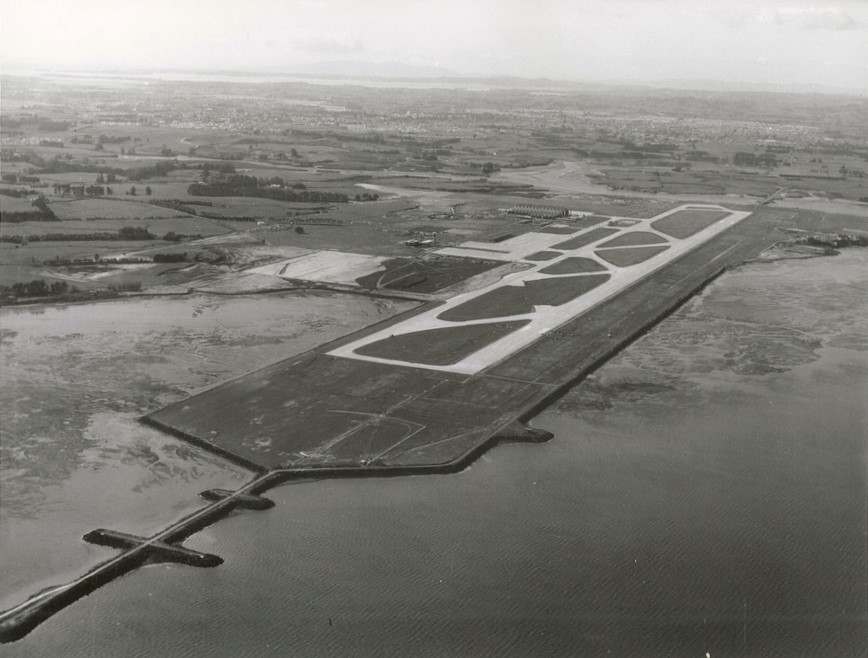
Māngere International Airport in 1965

The site of the airport was first used as an airfield by the Auckland Aero Club. In 1928, the club leased some land from a dairy farmer to accommodate the club's three De Havilland Gypsy Moths. The club president noted at the time that the site "has many advantages of vital importance for an aerodrome and training ground. It has good approaches, is well drained and is free from power lines, buildings and fogs." Prior to rebuilding, this was known as Mangere Aerodrome.

From 1948, the RNZAF Base Auckland at Whenuapai served as the civilian airport for Auckland. This was chosen, despite the hills adjacent to Whenuapai limiting the ability of newer aircraft to use the facilities, to the lack of cost to the Auckland City Council, as the site was already established as an RNZAF base. A September 1948 report by Sir Frederick Tymms recommended that Whenuapai Airport be replaced with a larger purpose-built airport located in either Māngere or Pakuranga. In 1958, the New Zealand Government commissioned Leigh Fisher Associates to survey and design the international airport at Māngere.

In 1960 work started to transform the site into Auckland's main airport. Much of the runway is on land reclaimed from the Manukau Harbour. The first flight to leave was an Air New Zealand DC-8 in November 1965, bound for Sydney. The airport was officially opened the following year, with a 'grand air pageant' on Auckland Anniversary weekend, 29 to 31 January 1966.

Qantas commenced the first scheduled Boeing 747 service out of Auckland on Friday 8 December 1972.

Upon the airport's opening, the runway was 2,591 metres (8,500 ft) long. The runway was extended westward to 3,292 metres (10,800 ft) in 1973.

A new international terminal was built in 1977. Prior to this, all flights used what is now the domestic terminal. After the news of famous aviatrix Jean Batten's death reached New Zealand in 1987, the International Terminal was named the Jean Batten Terminal in her honour. In 2005, the international terminal was altered, separating arriving and departing passengers.

Previously taxiway 'Alpha' (parallel to the main runway) had been modified and designated as Runway 23R/05L so that rehabilitation work could be completed on the main runway 23L/05R. After the work was completed, the temporary runway reverted to taxiway alpha, although the main runway retained its L/R designations. In 2007, construction began on a second runway to the north of the current one. Initially the new runway would have been 1,200-metre (3,900 ft) long and catered for regional flights operated by Air New Zealand using turboprop aircraft. This would have cost $32 million and would have improved the efficiency of the airport by removing smaller planes (which require longer separation distances from the air turbulence wakes of preceding jet airliners) from the main runway. At a later stage, the runway would have been lengthened to 1,950 metres (6,400 ft) to allow it be used by small jets (such as the Boeing 737 and Airbus A320) on domestic and trans-Tasman flights. In August 2009, however, the project was put on hold due to a downturn in air travel, and later in 2010 the project was suspended.

In 2013, the domestic terminal undertook a series of upgrades costing a total of $30 million. Stage one ran from January 2013 to March 2013, and involved changes to the drop off points and roads outside the terminal. In the second half of 2013, the baggage claim belts were lengthened, parts of the apron was changed, and new corridors were connected to the jetbridges. The two different sides to the terminals now share a centralised security screening area following the upgrade and an extra storey was added to the western wing to provide an airside connection between the Air New Zealand side of the terminal and the Jetstar side of the terminal. The work took 12 months to complete.

The 2015 Annual Report stated that Pier B would be extended. The extension was completed in 2018, with two new gates (17 and 18) being built. These gates can accommodate two wide-body aircraft or four narrowbody aircraft. During the COVID-19 pandemic, Auckland Airport recorded its first loss since listing, posting an underlying deficit of NZ$41.8 million for the 2021 financial year after revenue fell 50 per cent as traffic collapsed.

On 27 January 2023, record-breaking rainfall flooded both terminals, forcing Auckland Airport to close for almost 24 hours and leaving hundreds of travellers stranded as all flights were cancelled or diverted. In March 2023 the airport announced plans to replace the existing domestic terminal. The project is estimated to cost $3.9 billion. The plan is controversial, with airlines expressing concerns at the cost and the resulting increases in landing charges. 15 September 2024, the airport announced it would raise NZ$1.4 billion in equity to fund a NZ$6.6 billion programme to upgrade the runway and airfield and improve connections between domestic and international flights. The programme is opposed by Air New Zealand and Qantas, who argue that higher airport charges will render travel unaffordable.

== Facilities ==
=== Terminals ===
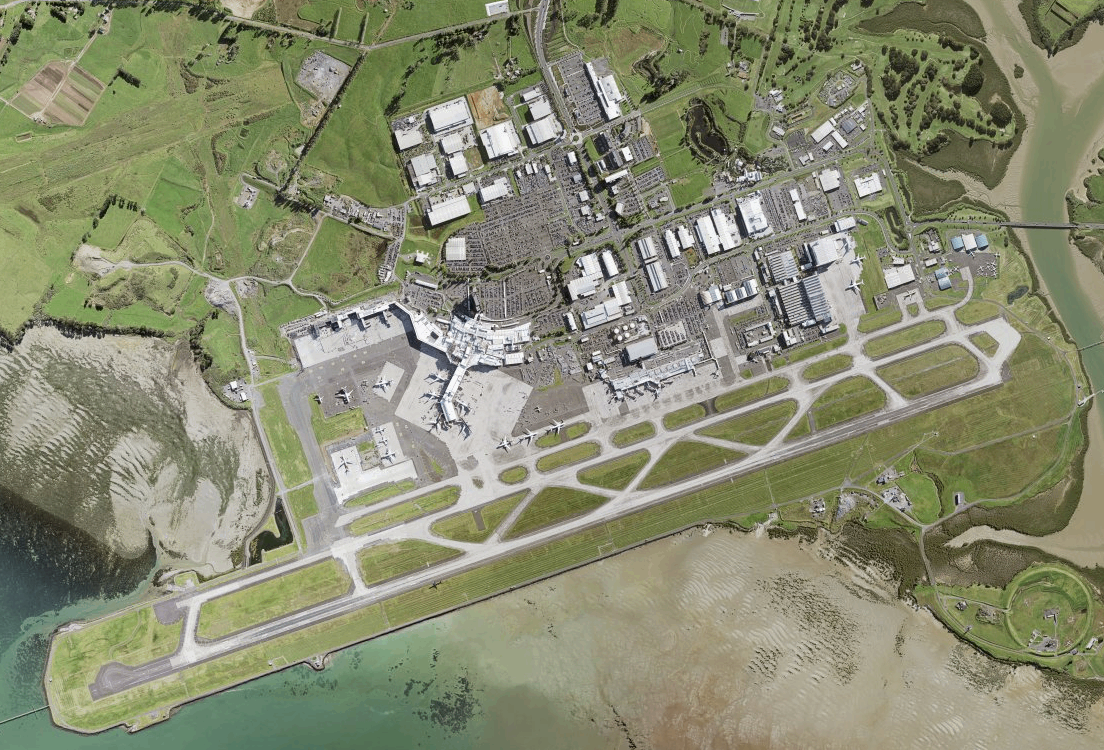
Aerial view (2017)

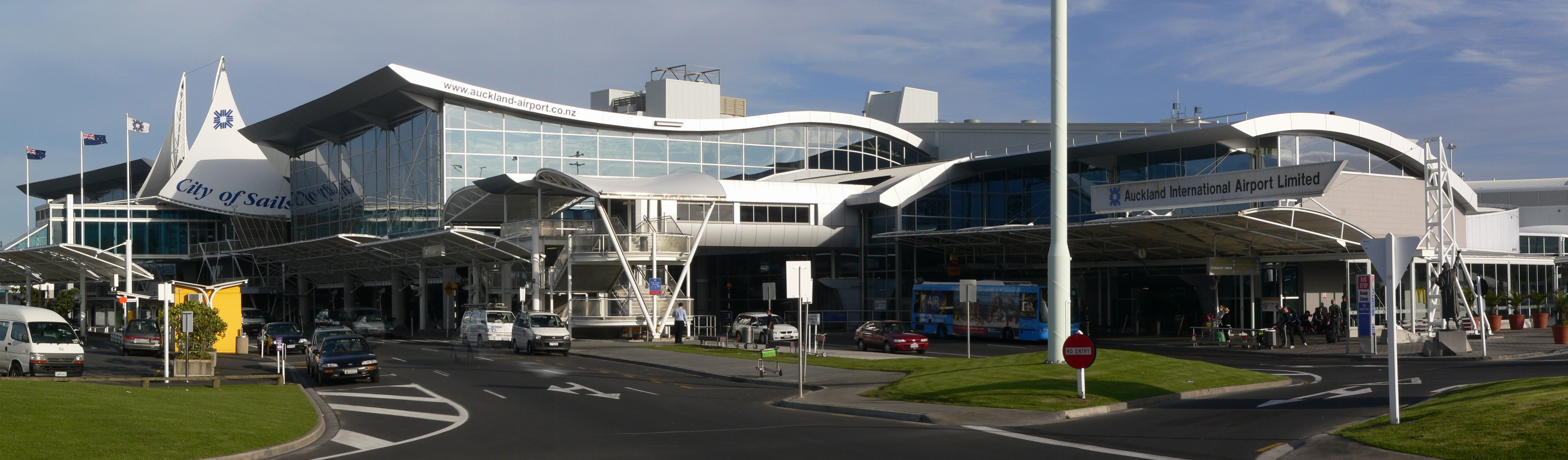
International Terminal

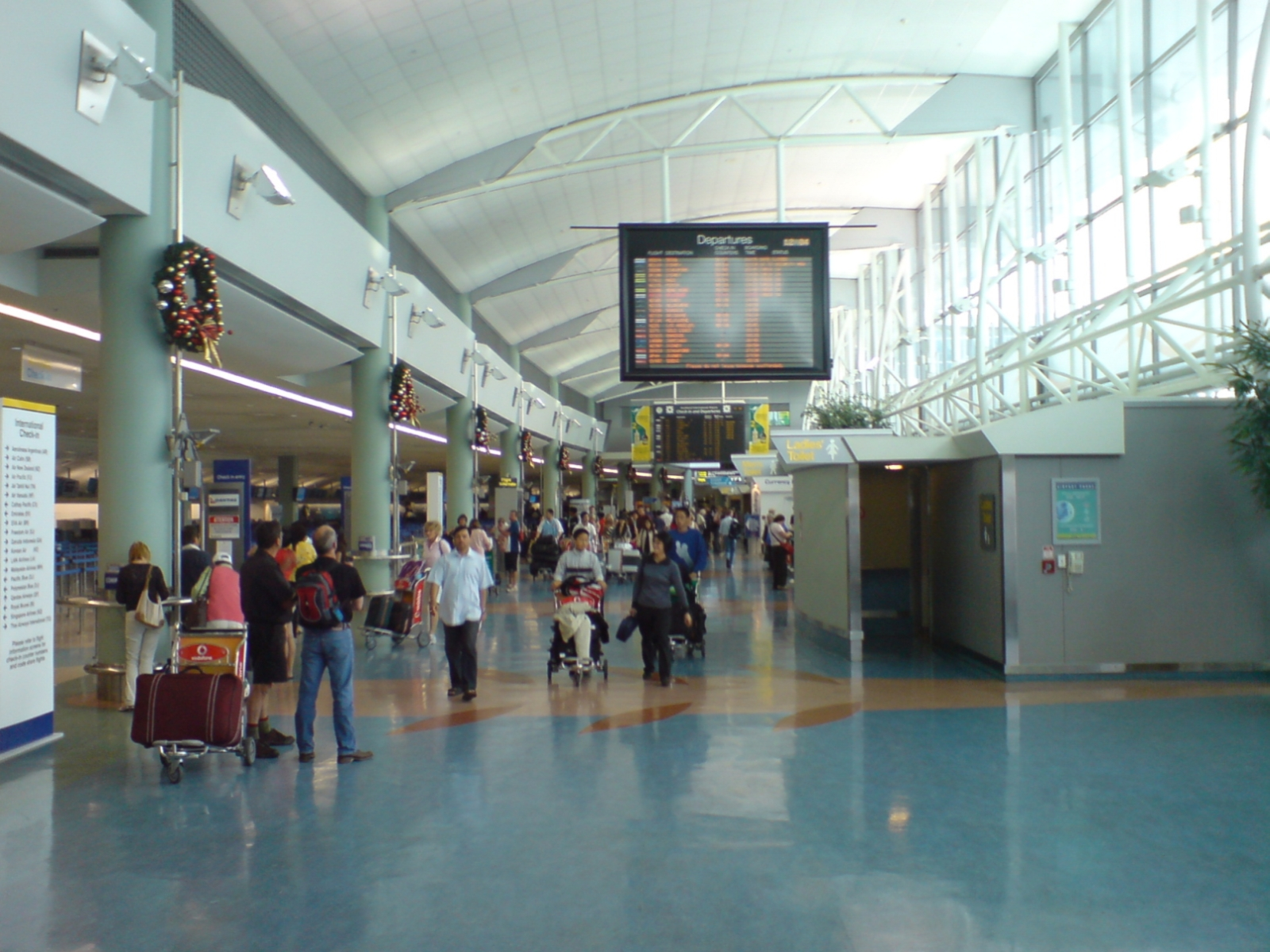
International Terminal check-in hall underneath the departures level

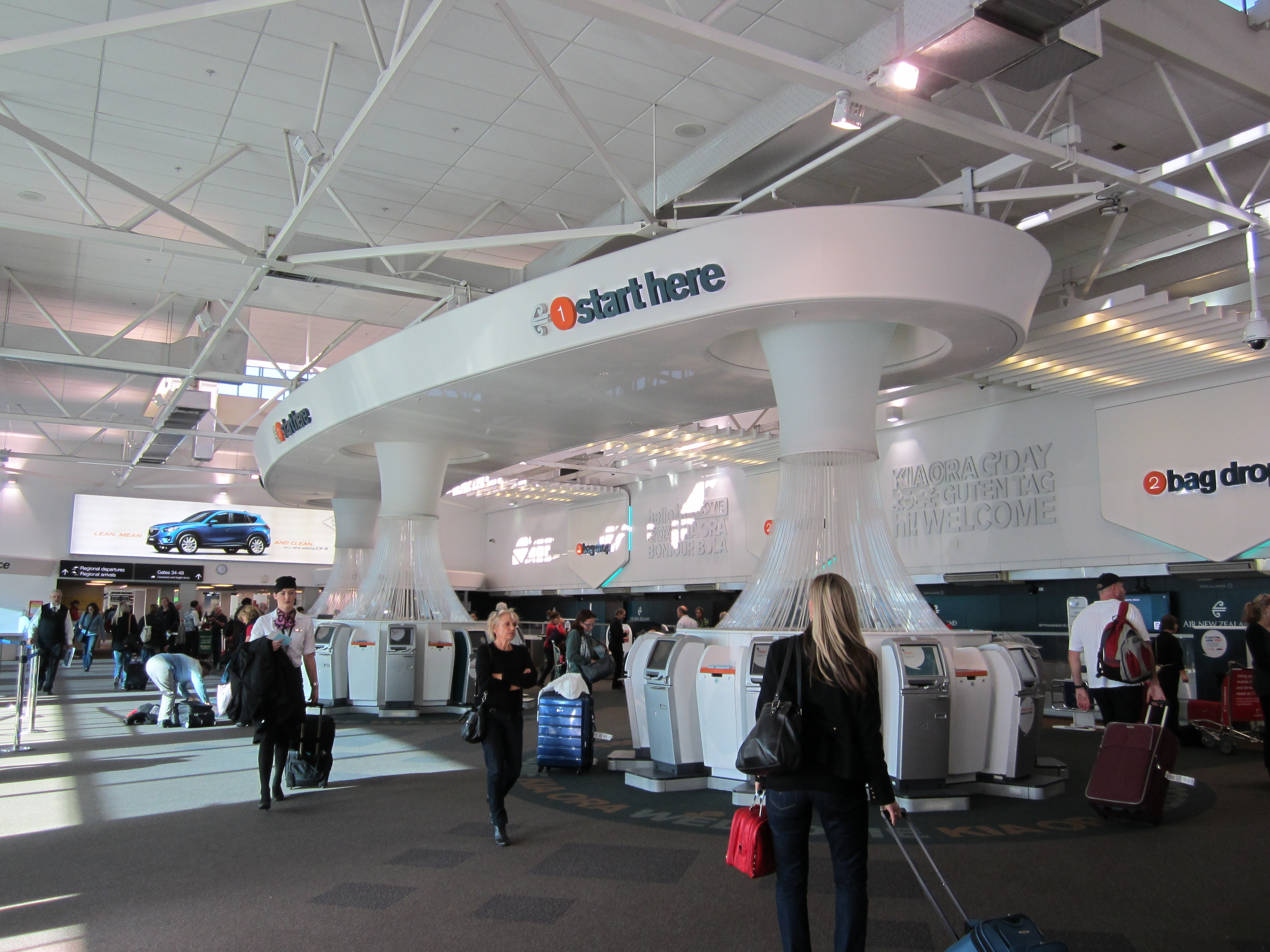
The Air New Zealand domestic check-in hall at Auckland Airport in June 2012

Auckland Airport consists of two terminals; the International Terminal and the Domestic Terminal. The two terminals are located approximately 500 m (1,600 ft) apart and are connected by a free shuttle bus service and a signposted walkway. The airport has 65 gates in total, 23 with jetbridges and 42 remote stands for aircraft parking. The airport accommodates large passenger aircraft like Airbus A380s and Boeing 747s.

==== International terminal ====
The international terminal building has three levels, with departures occupying the eastern half of the terminal and arrivals occupying the western half. Departing passengers check-in on the ground floor, then proceed to the first floor though landside retail, immigration and security, and duty-free, before proceeding to the departure gates on the second floor. Arriving passengers arrive on the first floor, passing through duty-free and immigration, before proceeding to the ground floor through baggage claim, customs and biosecurity, and into the arrivals hall.

The terminal has 22 gates: in Pier A, there are 10 airbridge gates (1–10) and 4 bus gates (4A–4D); and in Pier B, there are 4 airbridge gates (15–18), 4 bus gates (16A–16D), and gate 19 which lacks an airbridge. Constructed around 2009 with 5,500 square metres (59,000 sq ft) of area, Pier B was designed to allow for the addition of new gates when required.

Each international pier feature a tomokanga (Māori carved gateway) in the arrivals area accompanied by a karanga audio recording, symbolising Auckland Airport as a major international gateway and welcoming passengers to New Zealand. The Pier A tomokanga was installed in 1994, while the Pier B tomokanga was installed when the pier opened in 2009.

==== Domestic terminal ====
The two previously separate domestic terminal buildings have now been connected by a common retail area. The Jetstar check-in area is located in the western end of the terminal, in the building previously used by Ansett New Zealand, Qantas, and Virgin Australia. The Air New Zealand check-in area is located in the centre of the terminal. There are nine gates that have jetbridges in the domestic terminal.

Jetstar domestic A320 services operate from gates 20–23 (jetbridge gates). Gate 24 (tarmac gate) is used by both Jetstar and Air New Zealand's A320 aircraft. Gates 60–63 were used for Jetstar regional flights, with 62 and 63 being bus gates in a separate building at the Jetstar end of the terminal. Gates 20 and 21 were turned into 60 and 61 during peak regional times. Air New Zealand mainline services operate from gates 24–33. Gates 28 through to 33 all have jetbridges, while gates 25, 26 and 27 don't exist. Air New Zealand turboprop services operate from the regional section of the domestic terminal, along with Barrier Air and Air Chathams. This is located at the eastern end of the terminal and consists of gates 34–50 (excluding gate numbers 37, 38 and 44, which do not exist). These gates are linked to the terminal by covered walkways, and passengers walk across the apron to the aircraft. Barrier Air also uses remote gates 51–59, whilst further to the east, gates 101–106 are used for business jets and long-term parking.

==== Passenger separation ====
In 1993, the CAA instituted the requirement that all international airports in New Zealand must keep airside departing and arriving passengers separate. Auckland Airport was granted an exemption to this rule, allowing the airside mingling of arriving and departing passengers to continue, on the basis that all international flights operating into Auckland originated from airports with adequate security screening. Following the September 11, 2001 attacks and further regulation by the ICAO, the CAA required the airport to physically separate arriving and departing passengers by 2006. In the interim period until passenger separation was achieved, flights to the United States as well as all Qantas, and for a short time Cathay Pacific, flights were restricted to departing from gates where a secondary X-ray and metal detector inspection was operating.

To physically separate arriving and departing passengers, Auckland Airport decided to build a new departure level on top of the existing one, with the existing floor becoming the arrivals level. The existing departure lounges were kept by installing glass walls to separate the waiting areas from the newly designed arrivals corridor, and escalators were installed to transport passengers from the new departures level down to each departure lounge. The modifications to the terminal were completed in December 2005, and also involved the expansion of retail space within the pier by 600 square metres (6,500 sq ft) and an increase in the number of bus gates to four.

=== Radio station ===
Auckland Airport owned radio frequencies over a 15-year period. It purchased the Radio Hauraki frequency 1476 AM in 1990, and began operating adult contemporary and flight information radio station Info Music from the domestic terminal. It purchased 1XD Counties Manukau L Double L and its 1404 AM, 1548 AM and 702 AM frequencies in 1992, and changed the station name to Info Music Counties 1476 and then Airport Radio AKL1476. The 1476 frequency was leased to Independent Broadcasting Company in 1993, which used it at various times for Auckland 1476, The Breeze on 91, Lifestyle Radio, and Today 99.8FM. It was leased to talkback station The Point 1XD in 1994, and made available to Auckland Radio Trust to rebroadcast the BBC World Service in 1998. It was sold in 2005.

=== Property portfolio ===
In addition to the airport, Auckland International Airport Limited controls a 500,000 square metre property portfolio surrounding the airport including logistics facilities and distribution warehouses. The New Zealand School of Tourism's main campus and the ExecuJet Auckland FBO for general aviation flights are located on airport grounds. The Mānawa Bay outlet mall which features over 100 stores is located on the former Aviation Country Club site north of the airport and was developed by the airport corporation.

== Ground transport ==
=== Road ===
Two state highways connect to the airport; State Highway 20A and State Highway 20B. State Highway 20A leaves the airport to the north along George Bolt Memorial Drive and travels through Māngere as an expressway before joining State Highway 20. State Highway 20B leaves the airport to the east and crosses Pukaki Creek before travelling along Puhinui Road to an interchange with State Highway 20 in Wiri.

=== Public transport ===
- SkyDrive express buses operate between both terminals at the airport and SkyCity in central Auckland.
- The Airport Link is a Bus Rapid Transit-lite service that connects the airport to Puhinui Railway Station. This service is the first stage of an eventual full BRT line from the Airport to Botany Town Centre
- Park & Ride bus service is available for short-term and long-term parking. It is located 10 – 15 minutes from the domestic and international terminals. The park and ride service is also used by the majority of airport staff.

==== Rail proposals ====
A heavy rail connection from the airport to Auckland CBD was initially conceived as an extension of the Onehunga Branch line via Māngere Bridge and the suburb of Māngere. Another proposal was the construction of a heavy rail line to the east of the airport to connect with the North Island Main Trunk line near Puhinui Station, or the creation of a loop to connect the airport to both the Onehunga Line and the North Island Main Trunk Line.

The preferred option between 2016 and 2024 was an entirely new light rail line running from the airport to central Auckland via a direct alignment through Mangere, Onehunga and Mount Roskill. At Mount Roskill, it would have connected to the planned Dominion Road light rail line which would have continued on to Queen Street in Central Auckland before reaching a final terminus in the Wynyard Quarter waterfront development area. The project was cancelled by the Sixth National Government in January 2024.

=== Cycling ===
There are several cycle routes connecting the airport to the surrounding suburbs, consisting of both off-road tracks and on-road cycle lanes.

== Future developments ==
Construction for Stage One started in November 2007. Stage Two saw the runway being lengthened to 1,650 metres (5,410 ft), which enabled domestic jet flights to use it. Stage Three (final stage) brought the lengthening of the runway to 2,150 metres (7,050 ft), allowing medium-sized international jet flights to land there, from destinations such as the Pacific Islands or Australia. Eventually a new domestic terminal would also be built to the north to better utilise the new runway. The new runway will thus free up the longer southern runway to handle more heavy jet operations. The ten-year project would cost NZ$120 million, not including substantial extensions planned for the airport arrivals/departure buildings and associated structures.

In early 2014, the airport released their 30-year vision for the future, which envisaged the airport to combine both the international and domestic operations into one combined building based around the existing international terminal. This will see new domestic piers built to the south of the existing international precinct within the next 5 years. The plan also allows for the extension of the current international piers and also the creation of new piers for international operations. A new 2,150-metre (7,050 ft) long northern runway will be able to cater for aircraft up to the size of the 777 and 787 jets. New public transport links including a new railway station and line may be built in the future. The plan has been split into four implementation phases. Phase 1 will see all operations combined into one terminal precinct as well as improved road network surrounding the terminal within the next five years. Phase 2 sees the new northern runway constructed as well as the extension of the terminal forecourt by 2025. Phase 3 involves the extension of both international and domestic piers by 2044. Phase 4 sees the northern runway extended to a length of around 3,000 metres (9,800 ft).

In March 2025, the airport began building an alternative runway ahead of planned works on its main runway in 2030.

== Airlines and destinations ==
=== Passenger ===
Auckland connects to 23 domestic and 41 international destinations in North and South America, Asia, Oceania and the Middle East. Air New Zealand operates the most departures from the airport, followed by Jetstar and Qantas. On 17 September 2022, Auckland Airport marked a milestone in ultra-long-haul travel with the launch of services to New York's John F. Kennedy Airport (about 16 hours eastbound), the world's fifth-longest scheduled route, operated by Air New Zealand and Qantas.

| Airlines | Destinations |
|---|---|
| Air Canada | Seasonal: Vancouver |
| Air Chathams | Chatham Islands, Whākatane, Whanganui |
| Air China | Beijing–Capital |
| Air New Zealand | Adelaide, Apia–Faleolo, Blenheim, Brisbane, Christchurch, Denpasar, Dunedin, Gisborne, Gold Coast, Hong Kong, Honolulu, Houston–Intercontinental, Invercargill, Kerikeri, Los Angeles, Melbourne, Nadi, Napier, Nelson, New Plymouth, New York–JFK, Niue, Nouméa, Nuku'alofa, Palmerston North, Papeete, Perth, Queenstown, Rarotonga, Rotorua, San Francisco, Shanghai–Pudong, Singapore, Sydney–Kingsford Smith, Sydney–Western, Taipei–Taoyuan, Taupō, Tauranga, Tokyo–Narita, Vancouver, Wellington, Whangārei; Seasonal: Cairns, Hobart, Sunshine Coast |
| Air Niugini | Port Moresby |
| Air Tahiti Nui | Los Angeles, Papeete |
| Aircalin | Nouméa |
| American Airlines | Seasonal: Dallas/Fort Worth, Los Angeles |
| Barrier Air | Claris, Kaitaia, Kerikeri, Whitianga |
| Cathay Pacific | Hong Kong |
| China Airlines | Brisbane, Taipei–Taoyuan |
| China Eastern Airlines | Buenos Aires–Ezeiza, Shanghai–Pudong; Seasonal: Hangzhou, Sydney–Kingsford Smith |
| China Southern Airlines | Guangzhou |
| Delta Air Lines | Seasonal: Los Angeles |
| Emirates | Dubai–International |
| Fiji Airways | Nadi |
| Hainan Airlines | Chongqing, Haikou, Shenzhen |
| Jetstar | Brisbane, Christchurch, Dunedin, Gold Coast, Melbourne, Queenstown, Rarotonga, Sydney–Kingsford Smith, Wellington |
| Korean Air | Seoul–Incheon |
| LATAM Chile | Santiago de Chile |
| Malaysia Airlines | Kuala Lumpur–International |
| Qantas | Apia, Brisbane, Gold Coast, Melbourne, New York–JFK, Perth, Sydney–Kingsford Smith; Seasonal: Adelaide |
| Qatar Airways | Adelaide (ends 9 December 2026), Brisbane (begins 26 June 2027), Doha, Melbourne (begins 10 December 2026; ends 25 June 2027) |
| Sichuan Airlines | Chengdu–Tianfu (resumes 3 December 2026) |
| Singapore Airlines | Singapore |
| Solomon Airlines | Brisbane, Honiara, Port Vila |
| Starlux Airlines | Sydney–Kingsford Smith, Taipei–Taoyuan (both begin 24 March 2027) |
| United Airlines | San Francisco |

=== Cargo ===
| Airlines | Destinations |
|---|---|
| ASL Airlines Australia | Christchurch, Melbourne, Sydney–Kingsford Smith |
| Atlas Air | Honolulu, Sydney–Kingsford Smith |
| China Southern Cargo | Guangzhou, Sydney–Kingsford Smith |
| Emirates SkyCargo | Hanoi, Hong Kong |
| FedEx Express | Guangzhou, Honolulu, Los Angeles, Oakland, Sydney–Kingsford Smith |
| Parcelair | Christchurch, Palmerston North |
| Qantas Freight | Chicago–O'Hare, Christchurch, Honolulu, Los Angeles, Melbourne, Sydney–Kingsford Smith |
| Singapore Airlines Cargo | Melbourne, Singapore, Sydney–Kingsford Smith |
| Tasman Cargo Airlines | Christchurch, Melbourne, Sydney–Kingsford Smith |
| Texel Air Australasia | Christchurch, Palmerston North |

== Statistics ==
Annual passenger traffic for Auckland Airport ( Year Ending 30 June)
| Year | Domestic | International | Total | Change |
|---|---|---|---|---|
| 2005 | 4,823,916 | 6,133,899 | 10,957,815 | Steady |
| 2006 | 4,958,786 | 6,213,647 | 11,172,433 | ▲2.0% |
| 2007 | 5,068,794 | 6,373,427 | 11,442,221 | ▲2.4% |
| 2008 | 5,740,089 | 6,533,385 | 12,273,374 | ▲7.3% |
| 2009 | 5,653,306 | 7,359,611 | 13,012,917 | ▲6.0% |
| 2010 | 6,032,410 | 7,415,792 | 13,448,202 | ▲3.4% |
| 2011 | 6,042,468 | 7,781,819 | 13,824,287 | ▲2.8% |
| 2012 | 6,236,915 | 7,769,207 | 14,006,122 | ▲1.3% |
| 2013 | 6,760,537 | 7,755,678 | 14,156,215 | ▲1.1% |
| 2014 | 6,911,689 | 8,150,396 | 15,062,085 | ▲6.4% |
| 2015 | 7,198,595 | 8,618,191 | 15,816,786 | ▲1.4% |
| 2016 | 7,902,059 | 9,358,290 | 17,260,349 | ▲9.8% |
| 2017 | 8,601,841 | 10,820,535 | 19,422,376 | ▲12.6% |
| 2018 | 9,263,666 | 10,202,526 | 20,530,048 | ▲5.7% |
| 2019 | 9,593,625 | 10,506,660 | 21,111,613 | ▲2.8% |
| 2020 | 7,047,108 | 7,739,260 | 15,521,054 | ▼ -26.5% |
| 2021 | 5,844,734 | 602,125 | 6,446,859 | ▼ -58.5% |
| 2022 | 4,261,271 | 1,340,875 | 5,602,146 | ▼ -13.0% |
| 2023 | 8,087,709 | 7,773,555 | 15,861,264 | ▲183.1% |
| 2024 | 8,469,457 | 10,059,268 | 18,528,725 | ▲17.0% |
| 2025 | 8,428,052 | 10,306,188 | 18,734,240 | ▲1.0% |
| 2026 | 8,568,268 | 10,473,533 | 19,041,801 | ▲2.0% |

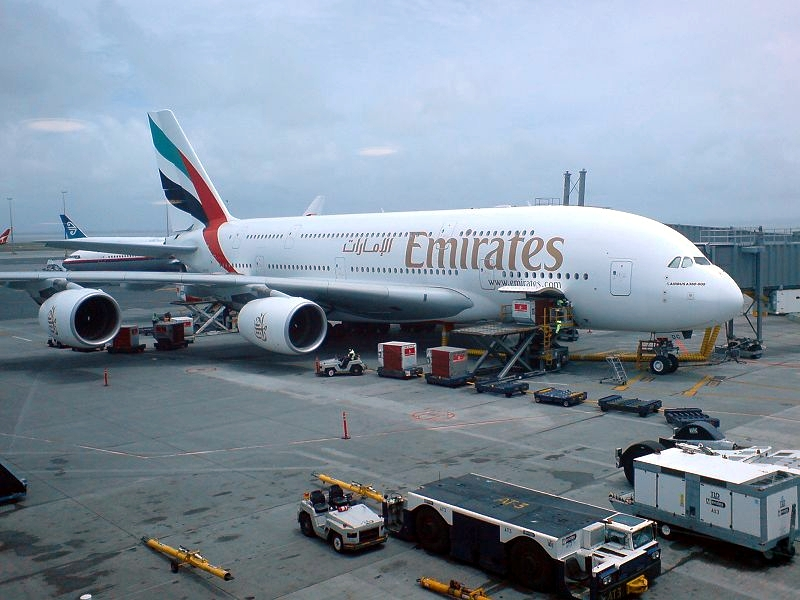
A380 seen at Auckland airport

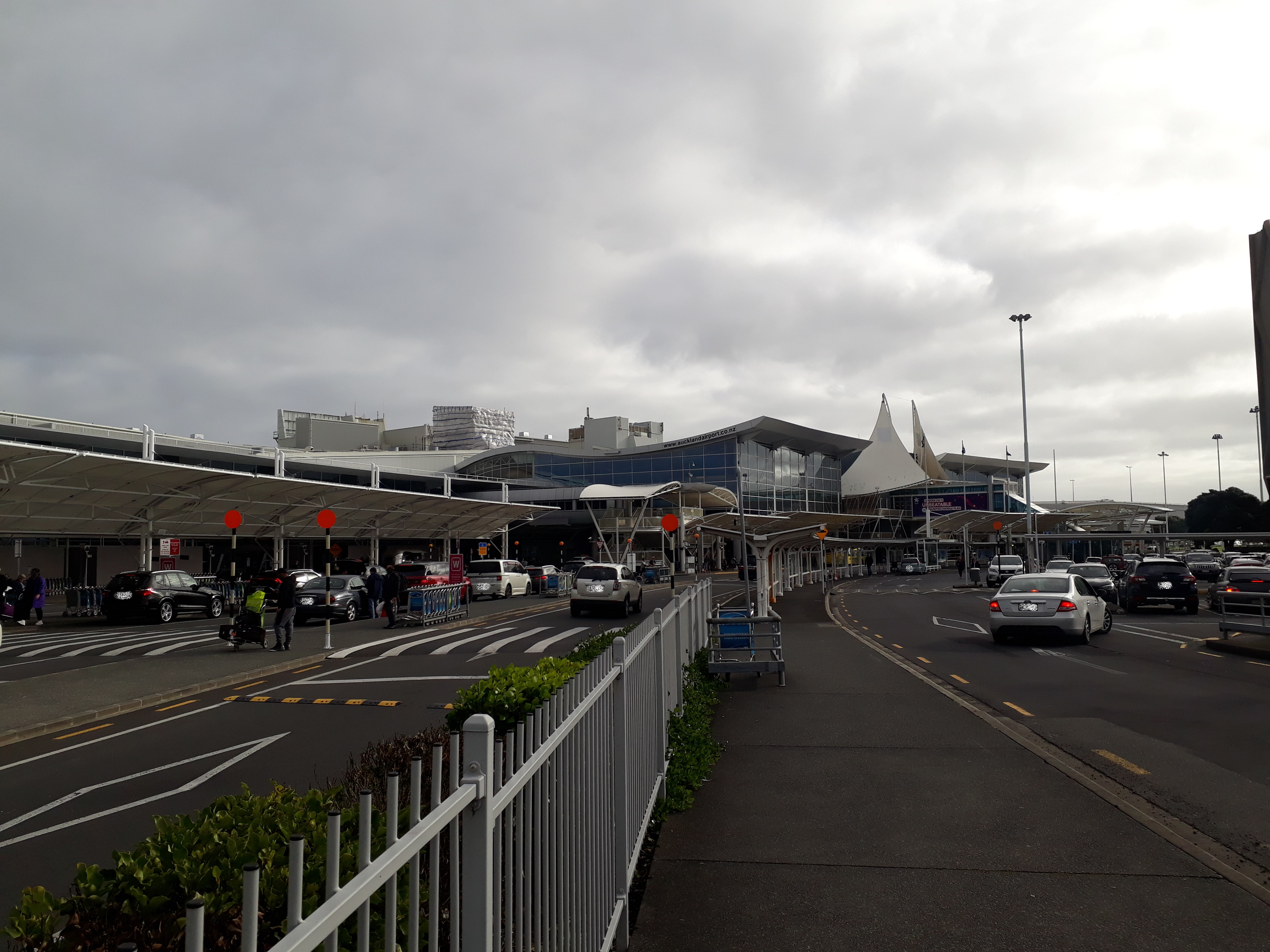
International terminal

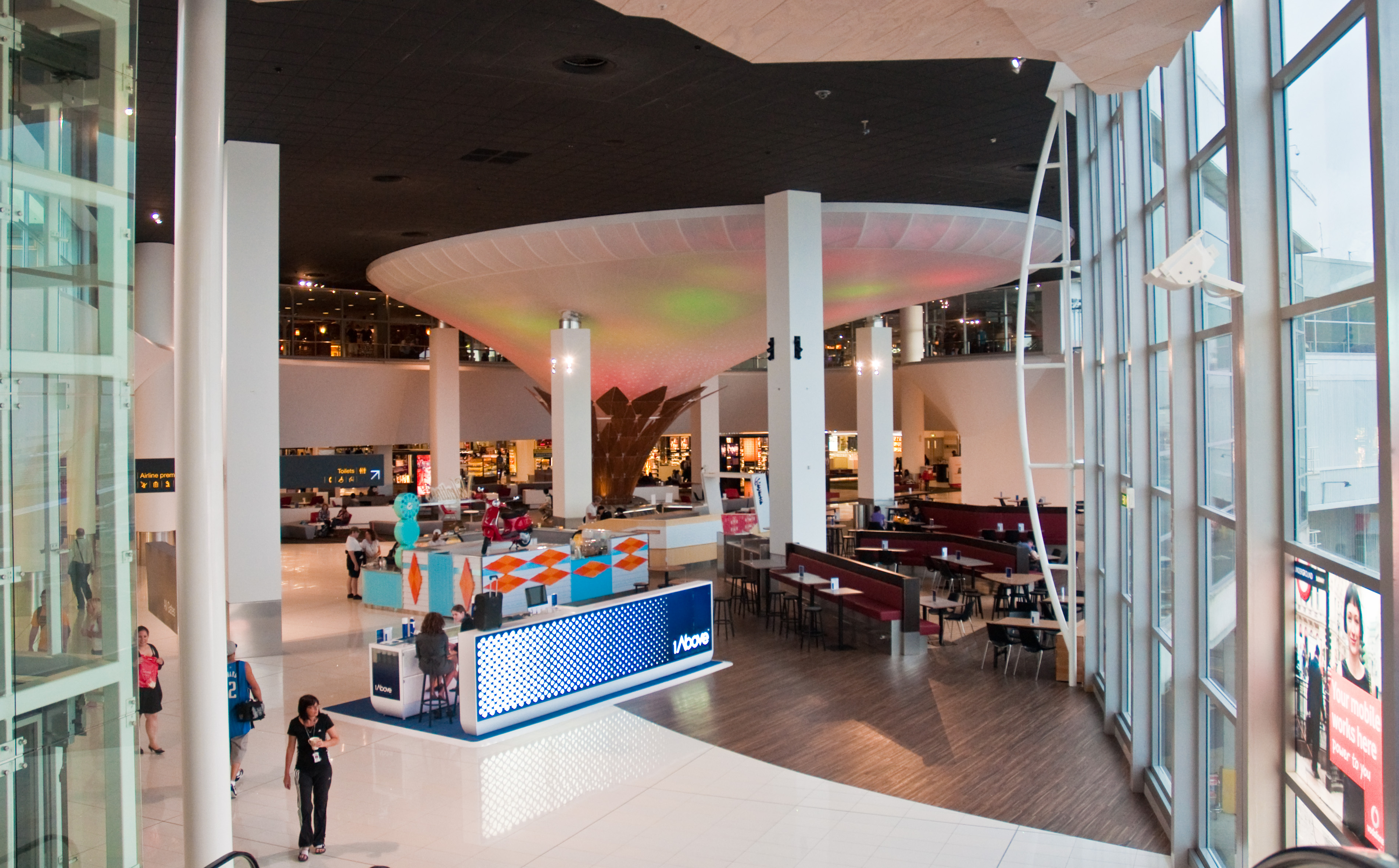
Former international departures area at Auckland Airport in 2010

Busiest international routes to and from AKL (2024)
| Rank | Airport | Passengers | Airlines |
|---|---|---|---|
| 1 | Sydney–Kingsford Smith | 1,441,411 | Air New Zealand, China Eastern Airlines, Jetstar, LATAM Airlines, Qantas |
| 2 | Melbourne | 999,789 | Air New Zealand, Jetstar, Qantas |
| 3 | Brisbane | 920,355 | Air New Zealand, China Airlines, Jetstar, Qantas, Solomon Airlines |
| 4 | Singapore | 617,886 | Air New Zealand, Singapore Airlines |
| 5 | Nadi | 568,692 | Air New Zealand, Fiji Airways |
| 6 | Los Angeles | 362,289 | Air New Zealand, Delta Air Lines |
| 7 | Shanghai–Pudong | 329,208 | Air New Zealand, China Eastern Airlines |
| 8 | Gold Coast | 326,376 | Air New Zealand, Jetstar |
| 9 | Hong Kong | 297,306 | Air New Zealand, Cathay Pacific |
| 10 | Rarotonga | 278,218 | Air New Zealand, Jetstar |
| 11 | Guangzhou–Baiyun | 228,804 | China Southern Airlines |
| 12 | Perth | 222,208 | Air New Zealand |
| 13 | San Francisco | 220,289 | Air New Zealand, United Airlines |
| 14 | Tokyo–Narita | 204,502 | Air New Zealand |
| 15 | Kuala Lumpur | 201,803 | Malaysia Airlines |

== Accidents and incidents ==
Accidents and incidents that occurred at or near Auckland Airport include:

- 4 July 1966 – an Air New Zealand Douglas DC-8 on a training flight crashed on the runway shortly after taking off, killing 2 of the 5 crew (no passengers were on board).
- 17 February 1979 – Air New Zealand Flight 4374 crashed into Manukau Harbour while on final approach. 1 crew and 1 company staff member were killed.
- 31 July 1989 – an Air Freight NZ Convair 340/580 crashed shortly after taking off at night. All 3 crew members were killed.
- 12 March 2003 - Singapore Airlines Flight 286, a Boeing 747-412, suffered a 490-metre (1,610 ft) long tail strike during takeoff. A transcription error saw the takeoff thrust and speeds calculated on a weight 100 tonnes less than the actual weight.

== Demographics ==
The statistical area of Auckland Airport covers 23.05 km^{2} (8.90 sq mi), and extends northwest of the actual airport to include Puketutu Island. It had an estimated population of 550 as of June 2025, with a population density of 24 people per km^{2}.

Historical population
| Year | Pop. | ±% p.a. |
|---|---|---|
| 2006 | 810 | — |
| 2013 | 567 | −4.97% |
| 2018 | 630 | +2.13% |
| 2023 | 528 | −3.47% |

Auckland Airport had a population of 528 in the 2023 New Zealand census, a decrease of 102 people (−16.2%) since the 2018 census, and a decrease of 39 people (−6.9%) since the 2013 census. There were 252 males and 276 females in 156 dwellings. 1.7% of people identified as LGBTIQ+. The median age was 30.7 years (compared with 38.1 years nationally). There were 129 people (24.4%) aged under 15 years, 129 (24.4%) aged 15 to 29, 240 (45.5%) aged 30 to 64, and 33 (6.2%) aged 65 or older.

People could identify as more than one ethnicity. The results were 25.0% European (Pākehā), 56.8% Māori, 31.2% Pasifika, and 12.5% Asian. English was spoken by 96.0%, Māori language by 17.6%, Samoan by 6.8%, and other languages by 9.1%. No language could be spoken by 2.3% (e.g. too young to talk). New Zealand Sign Language was known by 0.6%. The percentage of people born overseas was 19.9, compared with 28.8% nationally.

Religious affiliations were 36.9% Christian, 4.5% Hindu, 1.7% Islam, 5.7% Māori religious beliefs, 0.6% Buddhist, 0.6% New Age, 0.6% Jewish, and 1.1% other religions. People who answered that they had no religion were 43.2%, and 5.7% of people did not answer the census question.

Of those at least 15 years old, 57 (14.3%) people had a bachelor's or higher degree, 222 (55.6%) had a post-high school certificate or diploma, and 126 (31.6%) people exclusively held high school qualifications. The median income was $40,600, compared with $41,500 nationally. 36 people (9.0%) earned over $100,000 compared to 12.1% nationally. The employment status of those at least 15 was that 213 (53.4%) people were employed full-time, 36 (9.0%) were part-time, and 24 (6.0%) were unemployed.

== See also ==
- Auckland Airport Line (proposed)
- List of airports in New Zealand
- List of airlines of New Zealand
- List of the busiest airports in New Zealand
- Transport in New Zealand
