= Gisborne Airport =

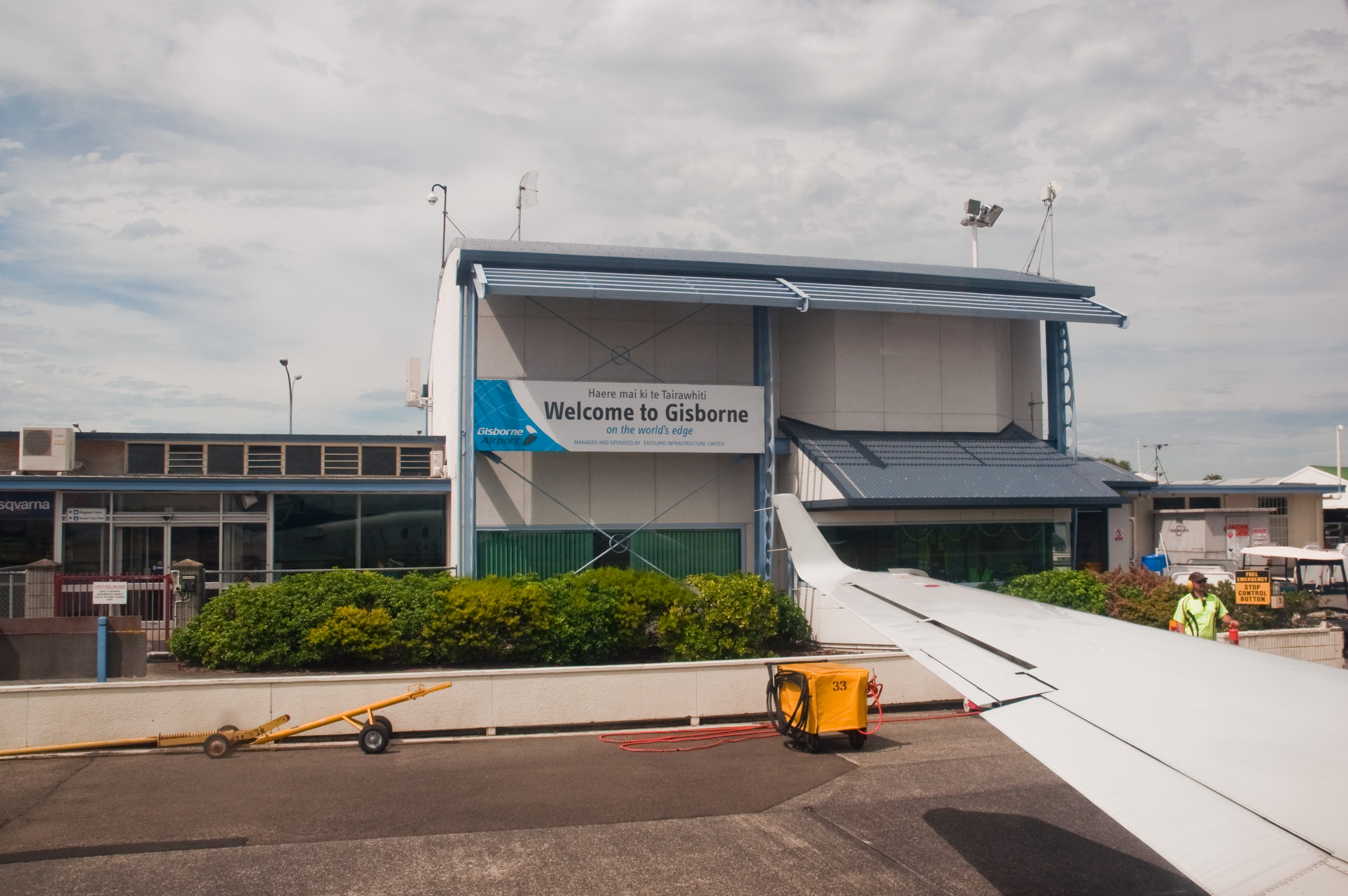
- Gisborne Airport in 2010
- IATA: GIS; ICAO: NZGS

Summary
- Airport type: Public
- Operator: Eastland Group
- Location: Gisborne
- Elevation AMSL: 15 ft (4.6 m)
- Coordinates: 38°39′48″S 177°58′42″E
- Website: www.gisborneairport.nz/

Map
- Location of airport in North Island

Runways
Direction	Length		Surface
Direction	ft	m	Surface
14R/32L	4,298	1,310	Asphalt
03/21	3,773	1,150	Grass
09/27	3,839	1,170	Grass
14L/32R	2,503	763	Grass

Gisborne Airport (IATA: GIS, ICAO: NZGS) is a regional airport located in the suburb of Elgin, 4.2 km (2.6 mi) from the city centre of Gisborne on the east coast of the North Island of New Zealand. Gisborne Airport is one of the few airports in the world that has a railway line, the Palmerston North–Gisborne Line, crossing the main runway. The airport has a single terminal with four tarmac gates. Gisborne Airport covers an area of around 160 ha (400 acres). It includes a sealed and night-capable runway (Rwy 14/32) at 1,310 m (4,300 ft) in length, as well as three grass runways suitable for light aircraft.

It was announced on 7 September 2018 that the airport will receive a $5.5 million redevelopment loan to ensure that the airport terminal reflects the unique cultural aspects of the Gisborne District, closely linking with the region's navigation-themed tourism initiative.

== Eastland Group management ==
On 16 December 2004, Gisborne District Council (who own and previously operated the airport) voted to let Eastland Group manage the airport and lease the assets from 1 April 2005. Gisborne District Council still remains owner of the assets. The lease runs for 15 years with an option to extend it for a further 15 years.

Quote from Eastland Group's website

Eastland Group pays Gisborne District Council an annual rental fee indexed to passenger numbers and is accountable for all capital investment. It bears all risk associated with the airports profitability, eliminating the need for ratepayer subsidy.

Since taking over, Eastland Group has created a new airport cafe 'V2', and a new airport logo.

== Airlines and destinations ==
Airlines	Destinations
Air New Zealand	Auckland, Wellington
Sunair	Hamilton, Napier, Tauranga, Whakatāne

== Aviation museum ==
The Tairāwhiti Aviation Museum is located in a hangar adjacent to the road entrance of the airport. The museum houses a collection of aircraft and artifacts owned by the Gisborne Aviation Preservation Society.

== Te Ihi o te Ra solar farm ==
Eastland Generation operates a 5.2 MW solar farm, with nearly 8,000 solar panels, on 6.3 ha (16 acres) at the airport. It was commissioned in November 2023.

== See also ==
- List of airports in New Zealand
- List of airlines of New Zealand
- Transport in New Zealand

== Sources ==
NZAIP Volume 4 AD Eastland Group website
