= Air Freight NZ =

Cargo airline in Auckland, NZ

IATA	ICAO	Call sign
OG	AFN	AIR FREIGHT
- Founded: July 1989
- Ceased operations: July 2016, replaced by Parcelair.
- Operating bases: Auckland, Christchurch and Palmerston North
- Fleet size: 5
- Destinations: 3
- Parent company: Freightways
- Headquarters: Auckland, New Zealand
- Website: http://www.fieldair.co.nz

Air Freight NZ was a cargo airline based in Auckland, New Zealand. It operated scheduled overnight cargo services on behalf of owner Freightways, and is supported by sister company Fieldair holdings. Domestic charter services are also operated. Its main base is Auckland Airport, with hubs at Christchurch International Airport and Palmerston North International Airport.

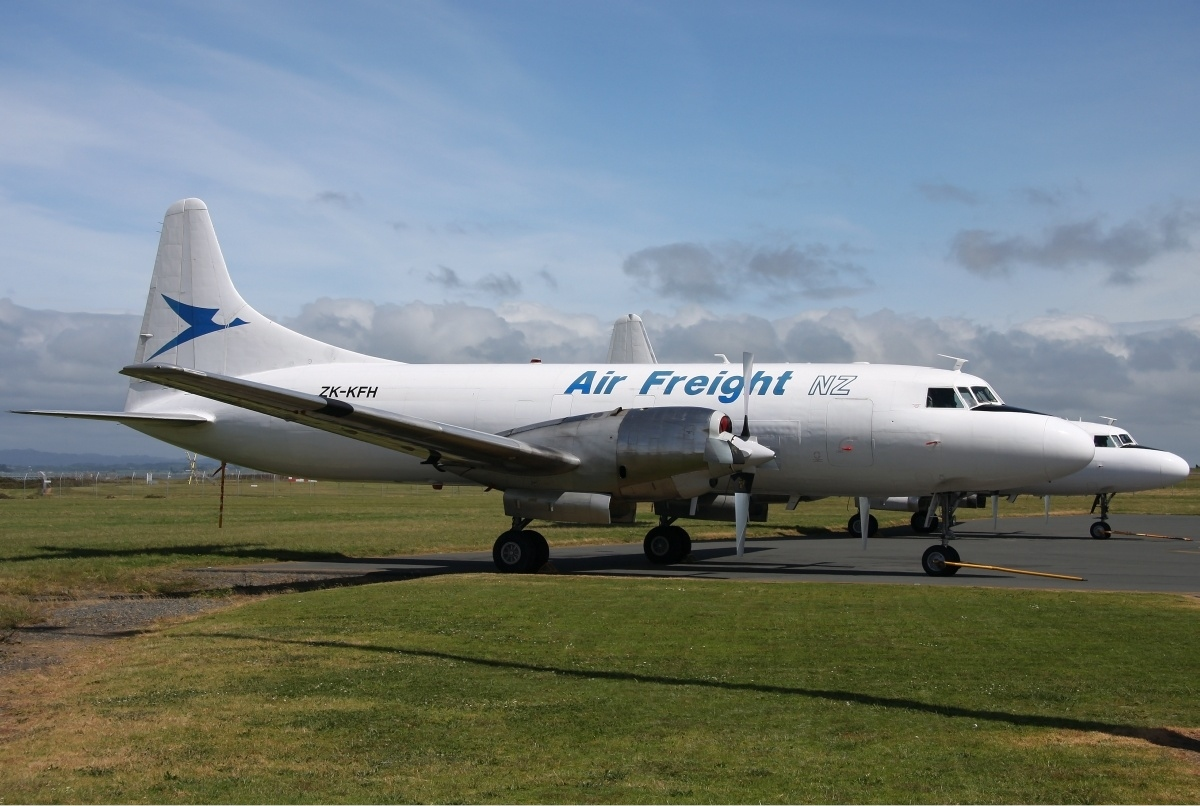
Two Air Freight NZ Convair 580s at Auckland in 2009

== History ==
The airline started operations in July 1989, headed by William (Bill) Olsen. Its primary contract was with the courier division of Freightways Group. It is now wholly owned by Freightways Express. The Convair carries 11 cargons of freight on each trip. Despite its age the Convair is a great performer capable of transporting seven and a half tonnes of freight at 300 kts.

== Accidents and incidents ==
- 3 October 2003: Air Freight NZ Convair 580, ZK-KFU, was lost off radar near the Kapiti Coast. Fatalities: 2.
- 31 July 1989: Air Freight NZ Convair 580, ZK-FTB, descended shortly after takeoff from Auckland Airport, colliding with a bank before crashing into Manukau Harbour. Fatalities: 3.

== Destinations ==
Air Freight NZ operated freight services to the following destinations in April 2013: Auckland, Christchurch and Palmerston North. Air Freight operated seven northbound flights per night from Christchurch Airport.

== Fleet ==
The former Air Freight NZ fleet consisted of the following aircraft (at June 2014):

- 4 Convair 580
- 1 Convair 5800

=== Aircraft Fleet 1989-2016 ===
Aircraft	introduced	Retired	Notes
Convair 580	1989	2016	Seven aircraft
Convair 5800	2004	2015	One aircraft
Piper PA-23-250 Aztec	1999	2016	Three aircraft.

== See also ==
- List of defunct airlines of New Zealand
- History of aviation in New Zealand
