= Ansett New Zealand Flight 703 =

1995 aviation accident in New Zealand

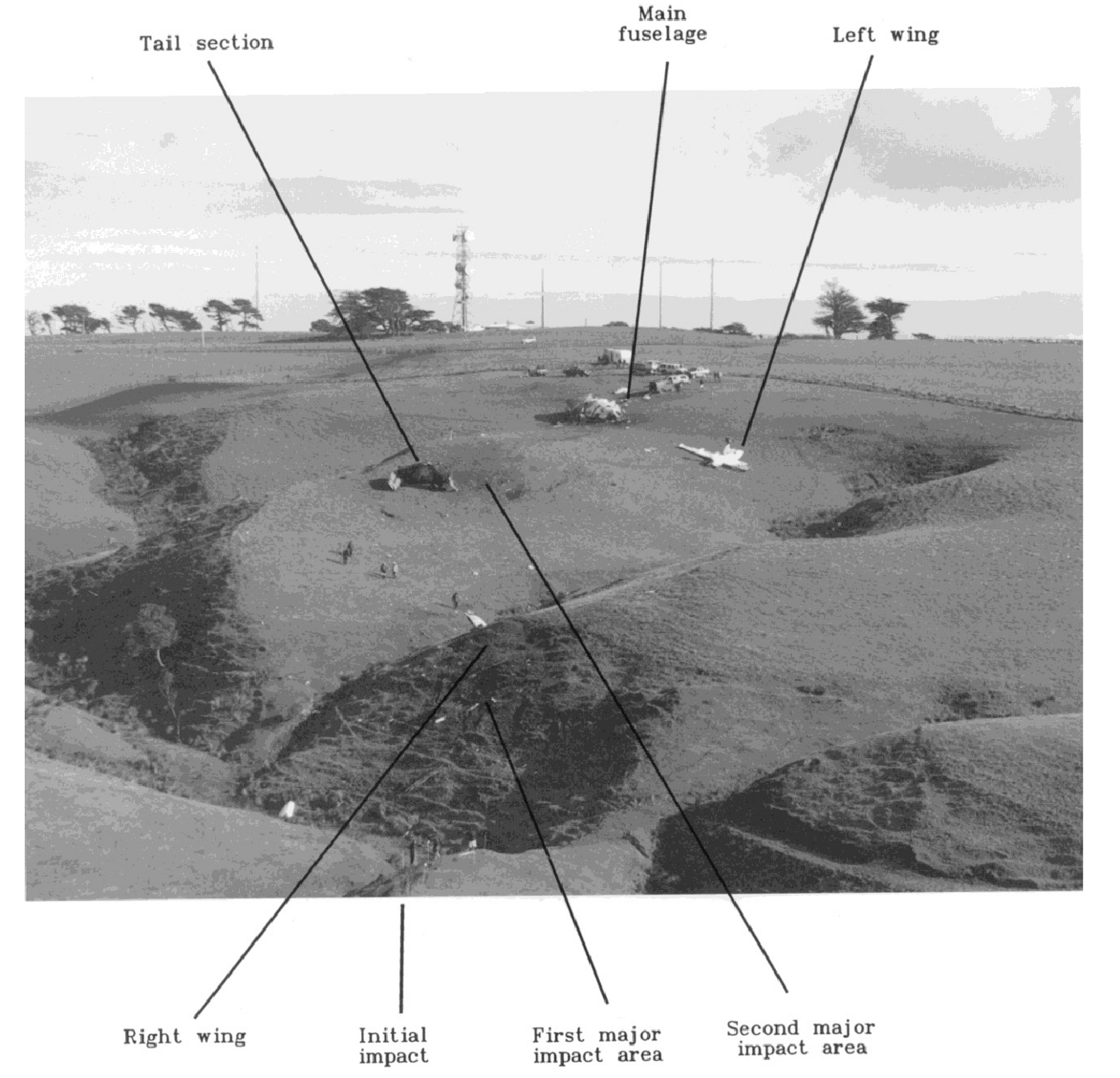
- General overview of the crash site

Accident
- Date: 9 June 1995
- Summary: Controlled flight into terrain
- Site: Tararua Range, near Palmerston North Airport, New Zealand; 40°20′0.07″S 175°48′0.28″E

Aircraft
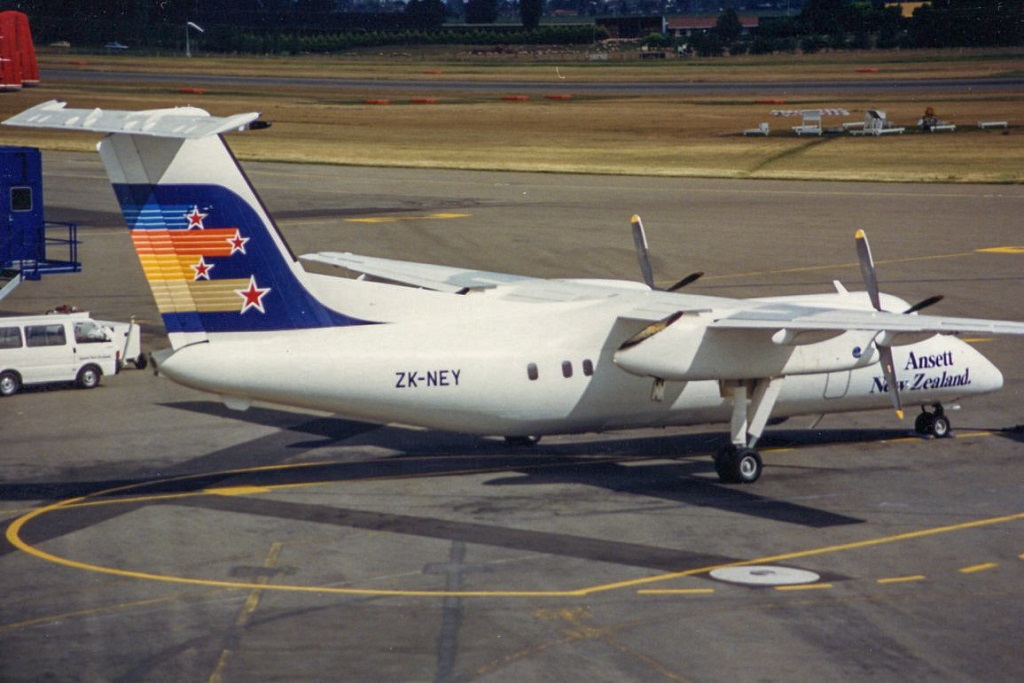
- ZK-NEY, the aircraft involved in the accident, seen with a previous livery
- Aircraft type: de Havilland Canada Dash 8-100
- Aircraft name: Palmerston North
- Operator: Ansett New Zealand
- IATA flight No.: ZQ703
- ICAO flight No.: NZA703
- Call sign: ANSETT 703
- Registration: ZK-NEY
- Flight origin: Auckland Airport
- Destination: Palmerston North Airport
- Occupants: 21
- Passengers: 18
- Crew: 3
- Fatalities: 4
- Injuries: 16
- Survivors: 17

Ansett New Zealand Flight 703 was a scheduled flight from Auckland to Palmerston North. On 9 June 1995, the de Havilland Canada Dash 8-100 aircraft crashed into the Tararua Range on approach to Palmerston North. The flight attendant and three passengers died as a result of the crash; the two pilots and 15 passengers survived.

While conducting a non-precision instrument approach in inclement weather, the aircraft's right main landing gear failed to extend and the captain decided to continue the approach while the first officer performed the alternate extension procedure. Distracted by the first officer's attempt to lower the gear, the captain allowed the aircraft to drift off-profile towards the Tararua Range. Due to reasons unknown, the ground proximity warning system sounded with insufficient warning for the pilots to avert the accident.

== Aircraft and crew ==
The aircraft involved was De Havilland Dash 8-100, registered as ZK-NEY. It entered into service in December 1986, and had accumulated 22,154 flight hours and 24,976 flight cycles. The Dash 8 is a high-wing turboprop aircraft, with the main landing gear located below and retracting into the engine nacelles. As a result, the main landing gear is easily visible from the passenger cabin.

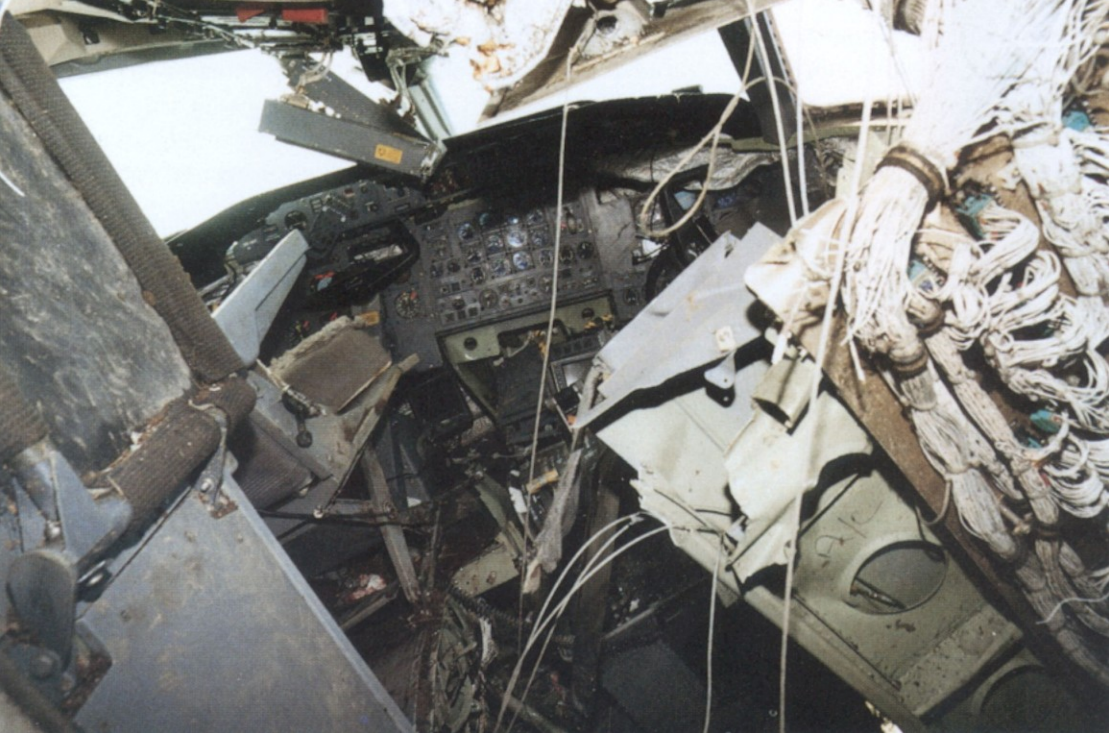
Cockpit of Flight 703 after the crash

The captain was 40-year-old Garry Norman Sotheran, who had 7,765 flight hours, including 273 on the Dash 8. The first officer was 33-year-old Barry Brown, who had 6,460 flight hours, including 341 on the Dash 8. The flight attendant was 31-year-old Karen Anne Gallagher from Christchurch.

== Accident ==
Flight 703 took off from Auckland Airport at 08:10 AM with 18 passengers and three crew members on board. Approaching its destination, Palmerston North Airport, the pilots briefed for a preferred VOR/DME instrument approach to runway 07, performing a circle-to-land manoeuvre to land on runway 25 if needed. At the time, Palmerston North Airport was reporting winds at 290 degrees (west-north-west) at 10 to 20 knots (19 to 37 km/h; 12 to 23 mph), which indicated runway 25 as the preferred runway. Visibility was reported at 20 kilometres (12 mi) reducing to 5 kilometres (3 mi), with few clouds (2 oktas) at 800 feet (240 m), scattered cloud (4 oktas) at 1,200 feet (370 m), and broken cloud (6 oktas) at 2,500 feet (760 m).

Due to departing traffic, air traffic control denied the approach to runway 07 and instead cleared Flight 703 for the VOR/DME approach to runway 25. While the runway 07 approach would have taken the aircraft over the relatively flat Manawatū Plains, the runway 25 approach instead took the aircraft on a 14-nautical-mile (26 km; 16 mi) DME arc to near Woodville. There, it would intercept the final approach track into runway 25 and descend over the northern Tararua Range.

Once on the final approach, the captain (as pilot flying) called for the landing gear to be lowered. Thirty seconds later, the two pilots noticed on the landing gear indicator that the right main landing gear was not down and locked. The captain ordered the alternate gear extension procedure and told the first officer to "whip through [the procedure] and see if we can get it out of the way before it's too late". After passengers also noticed the landing gear was not fully extended, the flight attendant communicated with the pilots to inform them of the situation.

The first officer referred to the aircraft's quick reference handbook (QRH) for the procedure, which required the pilot to open the alternate release door, pull down on the main gear release handle inside to operate the gear uplock, and then insert the handle into the manual hydraulic pump and operate it until the main gear was fully extended. The first officer, however, missed the step of pulling the release handle, to which the captain said, "You're supposed to pull the handle...". The first officer pulled the handle and said, "Yeah, that's pulled. Here we go."

Distracted by the landing gear alternate extension procedure, the captain failed to monitor the aircraft's flight path and allowed it to descend below the glide path toward the range. Less than ten seconds after the first officer pulled the manual release handle, the ground proximity warning system (GPWS) sounded. The pilots pulled back on the control column and raised the nose to 8 degrees; before they could fully react to the GPWS alarm, the plane impacted the ground at 9:22 AM. The initial impact occurred at 1,272 feet (388 m) above sea level; an aircraft on profile should have been 2,650 feet (810 m) above sea level.

== Crash site ==
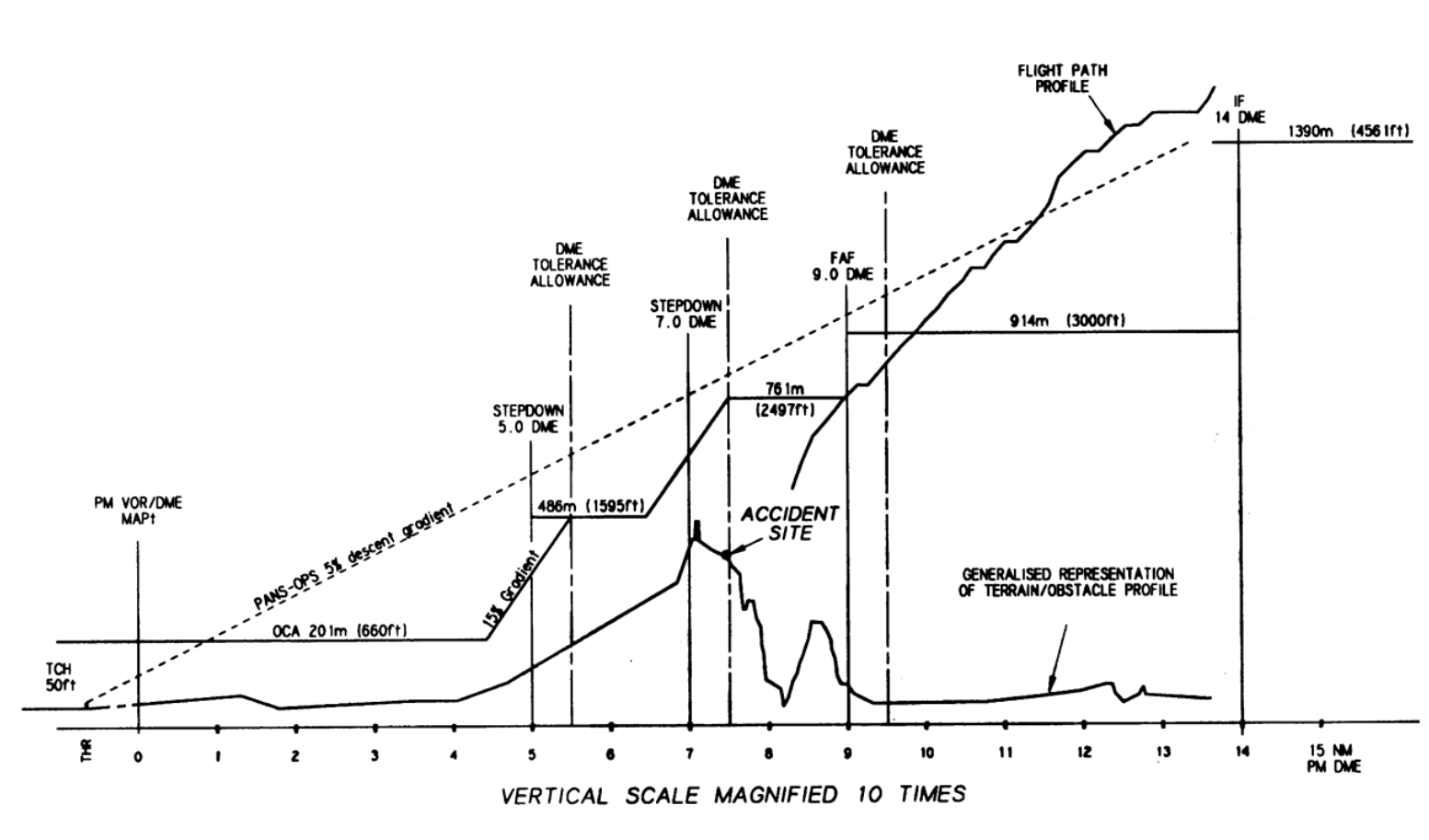
Flight 703 altitude chart

Flight 703 flew into rising terrain, striking high ground twice before the final impact, yawing to the right and breaking up as it slid along the ground. The fuselage came to rest 235 m (771 ft) from the site of the initial impact. The right main landing gear that the pilots were trying to extend was still in the retracted position. The crash site was located on a sheep farm, and three sheep were killed during the crash. The site of the accident is now part of the Tararua Wind Farm.

During the impact, the flight attendant who was unrestrained and leaning over a seat back to talk to a passenger was thrown to the floor and suffered fatal head injuries. Additionally, two passengers sustained fatal head, chest, and spinal injuries due to the impact. Passenger Reginald John Dixon tried to assist the two wounded passengers trapped near the wing root, as the wreckage caught fire. He received burns to 80% of his body and subsequently died from his injuries 12 days later. For his bravery in a dangerous situation, Dixon was awarded the New Zealand Cross, New Zealand's highest award for civilian bravery. In total, three passengers and the flight attendant were killed; twelve passengers and both pilots sustained serious injuries, while the remaining three passengers sustained minor injuries.

The aircraft was equipped with an emergency locator transmitter (ELT) that activated during the crash. However, the impact broke the ELT's antenna, significantly weakening the signal. First aid efforts were also hampered because the survivors were unable to locate the aircraft's first aid kits. The kits were not clearly marked, a practice dating from before 1987 when they contained narcotics and were considered theft risks. One passenger, William McGrory, found his work briefcase in the wreckage and used his mobile phone (an uncommon device in 1995) inside it to call 111. The police provided McGrory's phone number to air traffic control, which then contacted McGrory. Because of the limited visibility, the crash site appeared to be a grassy hilltop with a large stock pen nearby. Peter Roberts, with severe lacerations to his head and a fractured neck, managed to follow the fenceline and pace out a rough distance from the crash to these stock pens to allow McGrory to give rescue services a better idea of the crash location.

After speaking with local farmers, air traffic control pinpointed the likely location of the crash in the Tararua Range. Two helicopters searching the area detected the weak ELT signal from the crashed aircraft. They located the wreckage at 10:19 AM, 57 minutes after the crash, off Hall Block Road on the Woodville side of the range. The survivors were transported by helicopter and road ambulance to Palmerston North Hospital and Wellington Hospital. The last survivor arrived at the hospital at 12:07 PM.

== Investigation ==
The Transport Accident Investigation Commission (TAIC) issued its final report into the Flight 703 accident on 4 July 1997. It concluded the causal factors of the accident were:

- the Captain not ensuring the aircraft intercepted and maintained the approach profile during the conduct of the non-precision instrument approach
- the Captain's perseverance with his decision to get the undercarriage lowered without discontinuing the instrument approach
- the Captain's distraction from the primary task of flying the aircraft safely during the First Officer's endeavours to correct an undercarriage malfunction
- the First Officer not executing a Quick Reference Handbook procedure in the correct sequence
- the shortness of the ground proximity warning system warning.

=== Landing gear uplock failure ===
When the landing gear is retracted on a Dash 8, a roller on each main landing gear leg engages with the uplock latch, holding the gear in the retracted position without the need for hydraulic power. When the pilots select the landing gear lever down, a hydraulic actuator operates the uplock latch to disengage the roller, and the gear is extended by a combination of gravity and hydraulics. If the gear fails to lower, the uplock latch can be operated mechanically by pulling the alternate main gear release handle in the flight deck, while a manual hydraulic pump operates an alternate hydraulic system to assist in lowering the gear.

Over time, the latch would wear down from repeated contact with the roller. If the latch is worn, or the roller is not properly lubricated, the roller could jam in the latch and the uplock would not release the landing gear. Aircraft manufacturer De Havilland had issued several service bulletins regarding the risk of gear "hang-ups", and in August 1992, introduced a re-designed uplock actuator assembly to minimise failures. In October 1994, de Havilland issued an All Operator Message discussing a hang-up on another Dash 8 due to a seized roller. In this case, greater force and repeated pulls were required on the alternate main gear release handle to operate the uplock.

The accident aircraft, ZK-NEY, and sister aircraft ZK-NEZ had experienced fifteen incidents between them since their introduction in 1987 when a main landing gear failed to release or was slow to release. In all but three cases, the incidents involved the left main gear. Ansett New Zealand retrofitted the re-designed uplock to NEY's left main gear on 16 April 1995. At the time of the accident, Ansett were awaiting delivery of the required parts to retrofit the right main gear.

=== Possible radar altimeter malfunction ===
According to the TAIC report, an audio alarm telling the crew to climb the aircraft should have sounded 17 seconds before impact, but the GPWS malfunctioned, for reasons that have never been determined. There was an investigation by the New Zealand Police in 2001 into whether or not a mobile phone call from the aircraft may have interfered with the system. The official crash report does mention the following on page 69:

"The aircraft manufacturer's avionics representative advised that there was no likelihood that the operation of a computer, other electronic device or a cell phone would have affected the aircraft's flight instruments."

Later study of the wreckage of Flight 703 revealed that the antennas for the radar altimeter (which sends a signal to the GPWS indicating how far above the ground the aircraft is) had been painted and this possibly reduced the GPWS's ability to provide a timely alarm, although later comments by TAIC insisted the paint did not block or reflect signals. Radar altimeter antennas are clearly embossed with the words, "do not paint", a warning that was not heeded. Bench testing of the radar altimeter proved the unit was still functioning perfectly after its recovery from the wreckage.

In a February 1996 letter to TAIC, during the investigation, the captain recalled that his altimeter display suddenly changed from 2,800 feet (850 m) altitude to 1,000 feet (300 m); TAIC was not able to replicate this action when running tests on the flight's actual radar altimeter, and also noted that a second, independent, altimeter was present for the crew to use for cross-check and reference. (Note: Page 48, sub-section "The Captain's altimeter")

== Aftermath ==
At the time of the incident, New Zealand had not enacted section 5.12 of Convention on International Civil Aviation Annex 13, which made evidence taken as part of an accident investigation inadmissible in criminal proceedings. As part of the criminal inquiry, Police requested the original cockpit voice recorder tape from the TAIC. After the TAIC refused, the police sought a High Court order to procure the tape, which was denied on the basis the CVR was inadmissible in court. The Police appealed to the Court of Appeal, who overturned the High Court's ruling and held the police did have the right to procure the tape and for it to be admissible. In response, Parliament passed the Transport Accident Investigation Commission Amendment Act 1999 to implement section 5.12 of Annex 13. The amendment Act came into force on 10 September 1999, but only applied to accidents and incidents on or after that date.

As a result of the police investigation, Captain Garry Sotheran was charged in April 2000 with four counts of manslaughter and three counts of injuring passengers. After a six-week trial at the Palmerston North High Court in June 2001, the jury found Sotheran not guilty on all charges.

== In popular culture ==
The events of Flight 703 were featured in the 2021 episode "Caught in a Jam", of the Canadian TV series Mayday.

== See also ==
- Eastern Air Lines Flight 401, Another plane which descended and crashed while trying to fix a landing gear problem.
- 2007 Bombardier Dash 8 landing gear accidents
