= Christchurch Airport =

Airport serving Christchurch, New Zealand

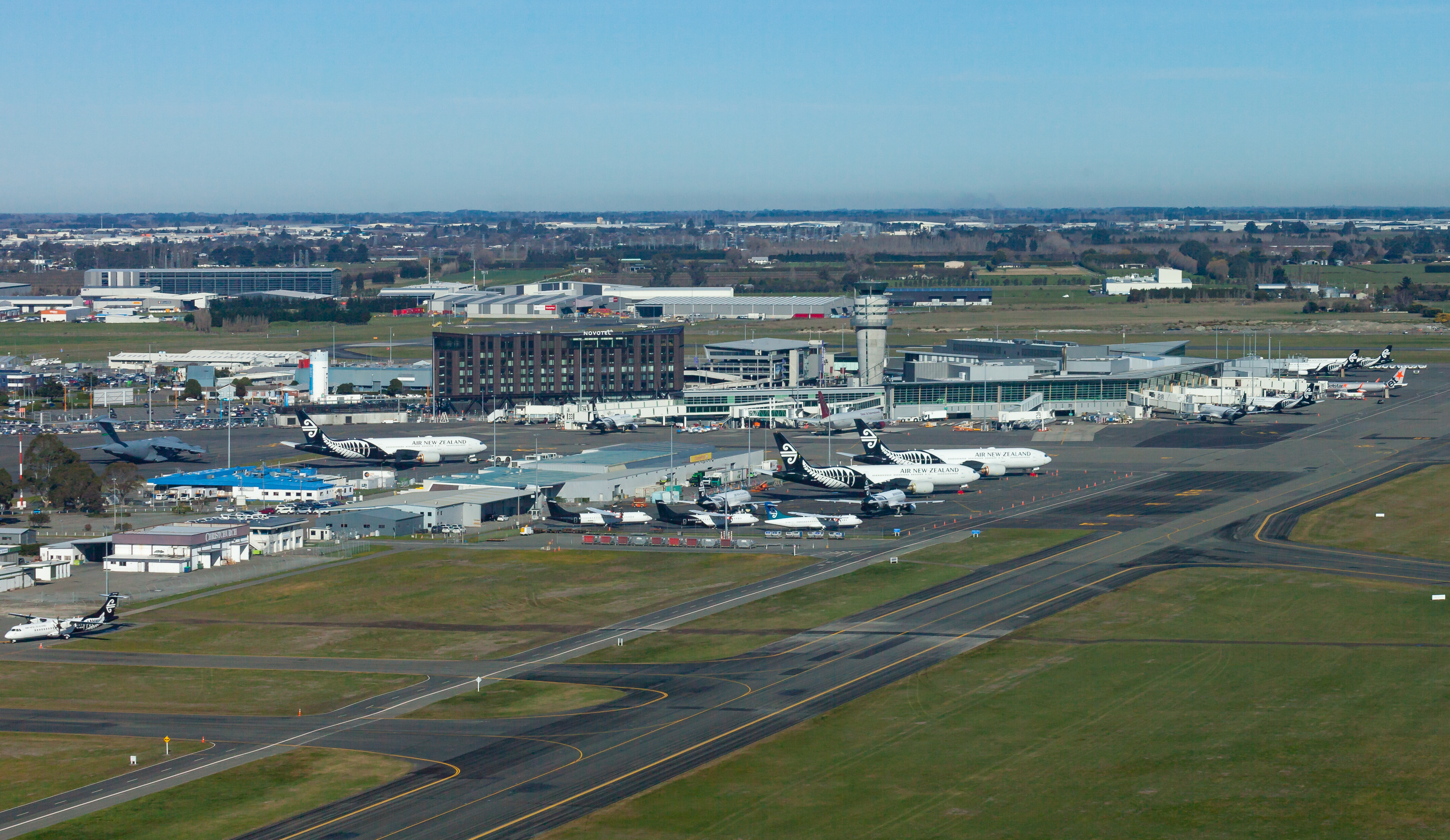
- Aerial view of Christchurch Airport (2020)
- IATA: CHC; ICAO: NZCH; WMO: 93781

Summary
- Airport type: Public / military
- Owner: Christchurch City Council (75%); NZ Government (25%)
- Operator: Christchurch International Airport Limited (CIAL)
- Serves: Christchurch
- Location: Harewood, Christchurch, New Zealand
- Opened: 18 May 1940; 86 years ago
- Hub for: Air New Zealand
- Focus city for: ASL Airlines Australia
- Operating base for: Jetstar
- Time zone: NZST (UTC+12:00)
  - Summer (DST): NZDT (UTC+13:00)
- Elevation AMSL: 37 m (121 ft)
- Coordinates: 43°29′22″S 172°31′56″E
- Website: www.christchurchairport.co.nz

Map
- Location of the airport in Christchurch CHC/NZCH (New Zealand) CHC/NZCH (Oceania)

Runways
Direction	Length		Surface
Direction	m	ft	Surface
02/20	3,288	10,785	Asphalt – primary
11/29	1,741	5,712	Asphalt – secondary
02/20	515	1,690	Grass – Aero Club

Helipads
Number	Length		Surface
Number	m	ft	Surface
3	12	39	Grass

Statistics (year to 30 June 2026)
- Passengers (total): 6,851,111 ▲7.1%
- Movements (FY 2025): 96,700

Christchurch Airport (IATA: CHC, ICAO: NZCH) is an international airport serving Christchurch, New Zealand. It is located 12 km (7.5 mi) to the northwest of the city centre, in the suburb of Harewood. Christchurch (Harewood) Airport officially opened on 18 May 1940 and became New Zealand's first international airport on 16 December 1950. It is New Zealand's second busiest airport by annual passengers and aircraft movements, after Auckland and one of only two airports in New Zealand that regularly handle the Airbus A380 aircraft (also Auckland). The airport is curfew free, operating 24 hours a day.

The prevailing wind in Christchurch is from the north-east and to a lesser extent from the south-west, but the city is also affected by Canterbury's nor'wester foehn wind. As a result, the airport has two perpendicular runways: a 3,288-metre (10,787 ft) primary runway (02/20) oriented with the north-easterly and south-westerly prevailing winds, and a 1,741-metre (5,712 ft) secondary runway (11/29) oriented for use during nor'westers. The airport also has a third grass runway, parallel to the primary runway, for use by general aviation. To serve an increasing number of passengers, the airport has completed construction of a major terminal upgrade. The new construction's primary wing opened in 2011 and the upgrade was completed in 2013.

== History ==
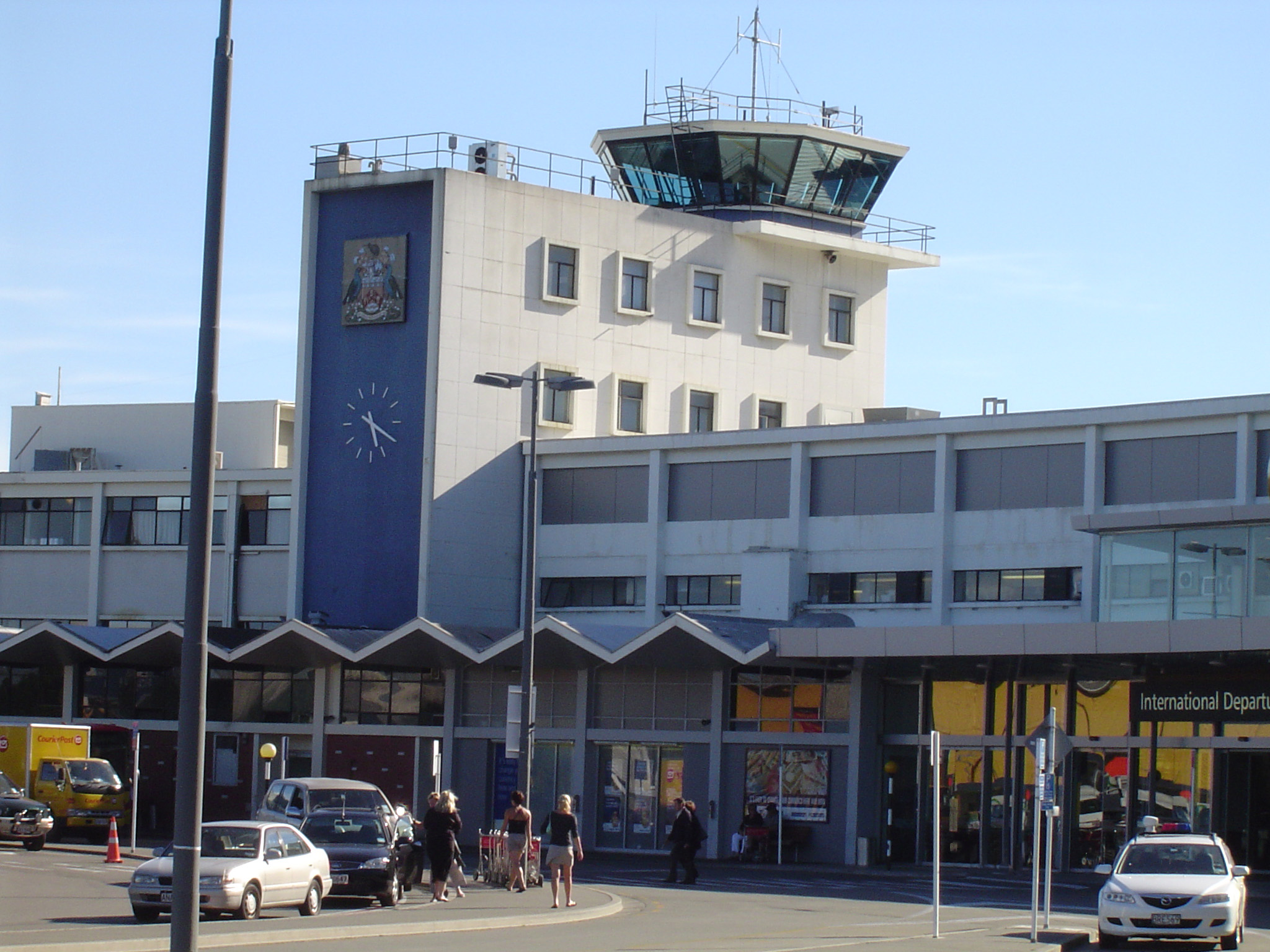
The former 1960 terminal building and control tower designed by Paul Pascoe

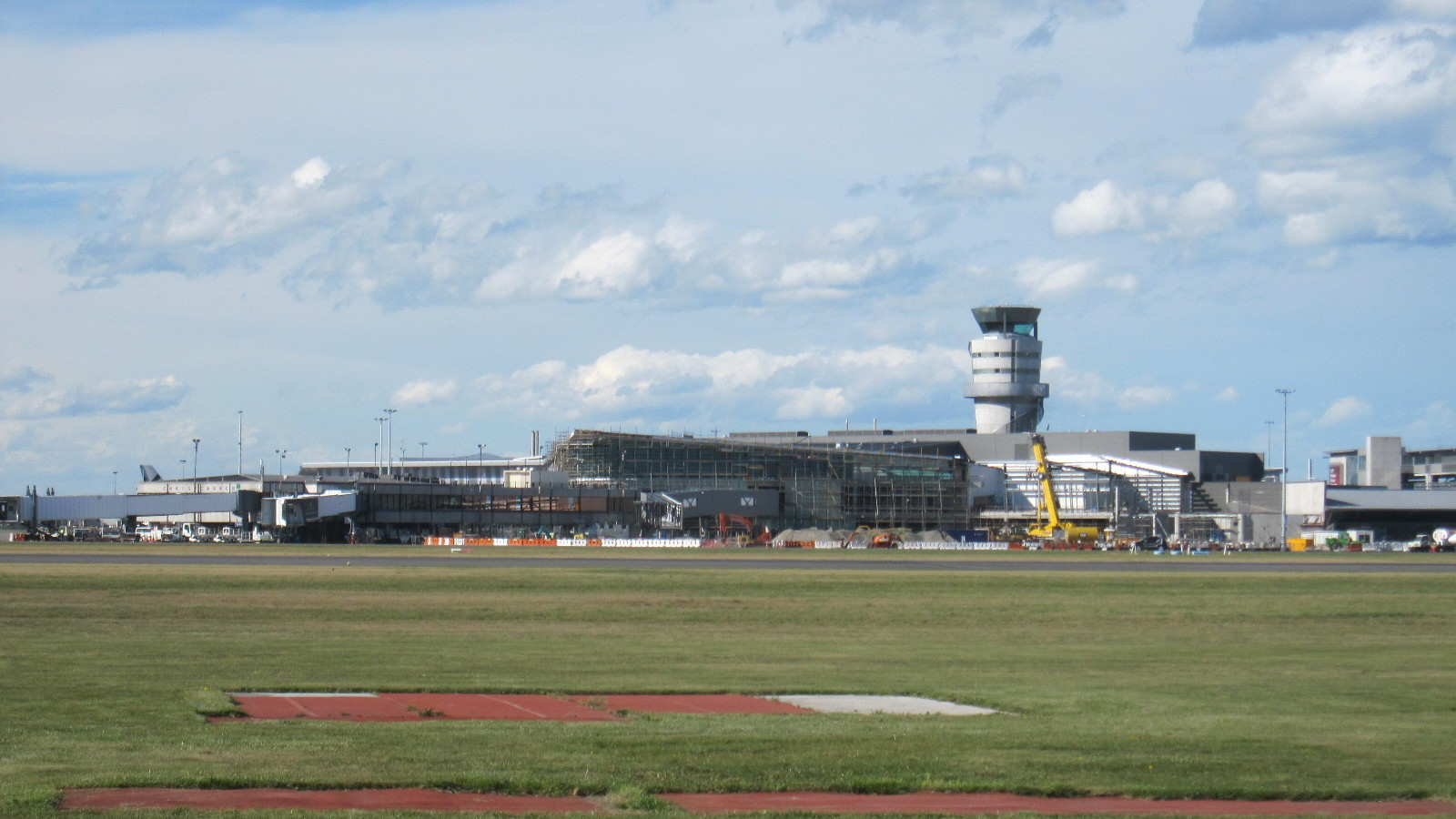
The new domestic terminal under construction

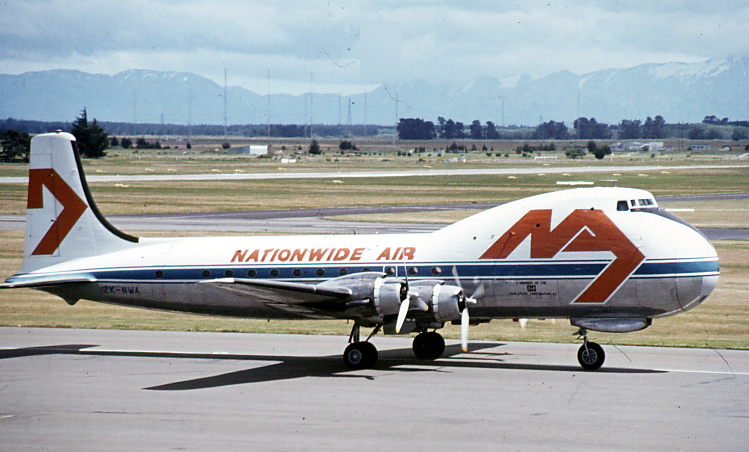
Former Nationwide Air Aviation Traders Carvair at Christchurch in 1977

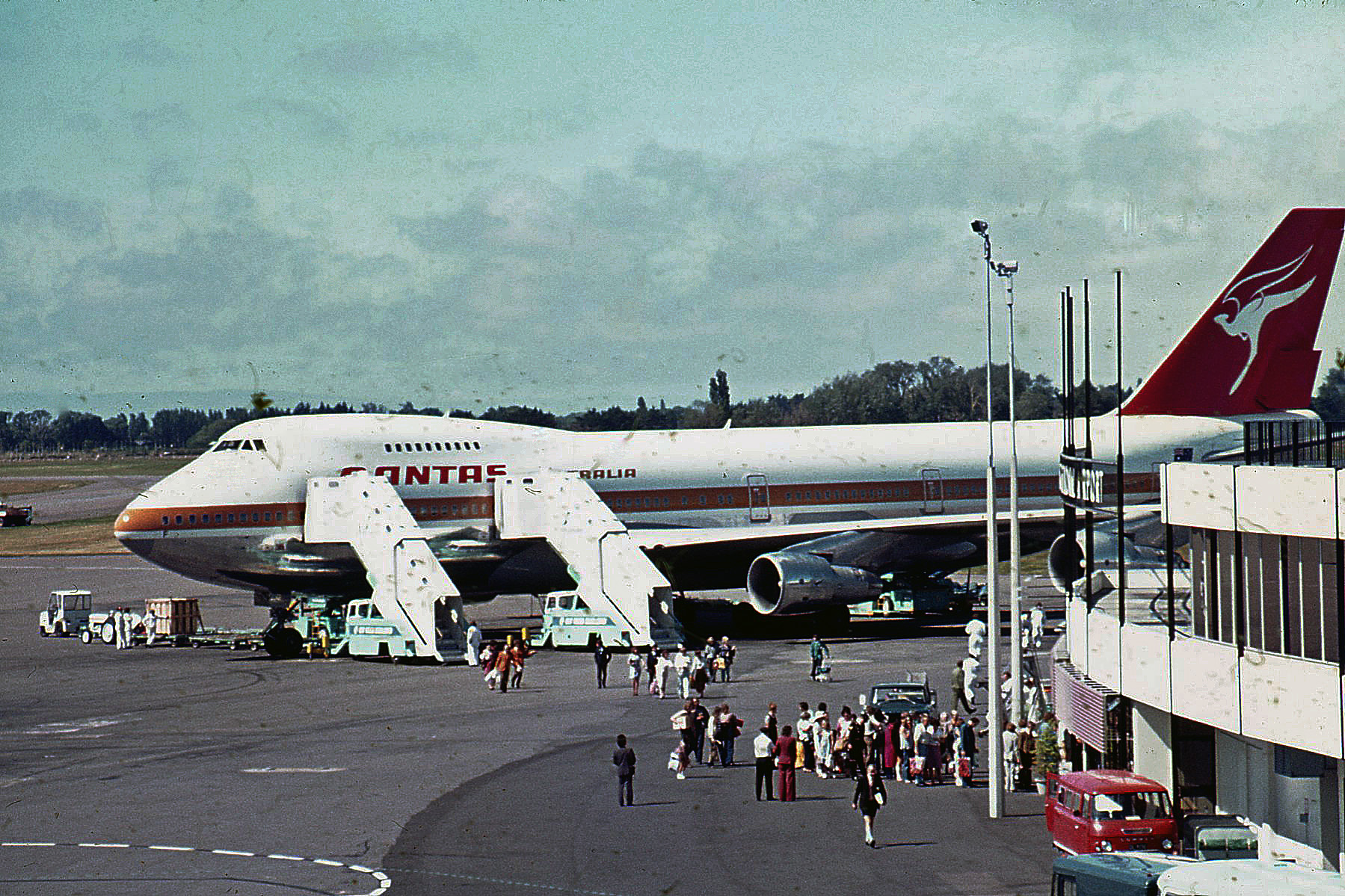
Passengers disembarking from a Qantas Boeing 747-200 on the apron in 1978

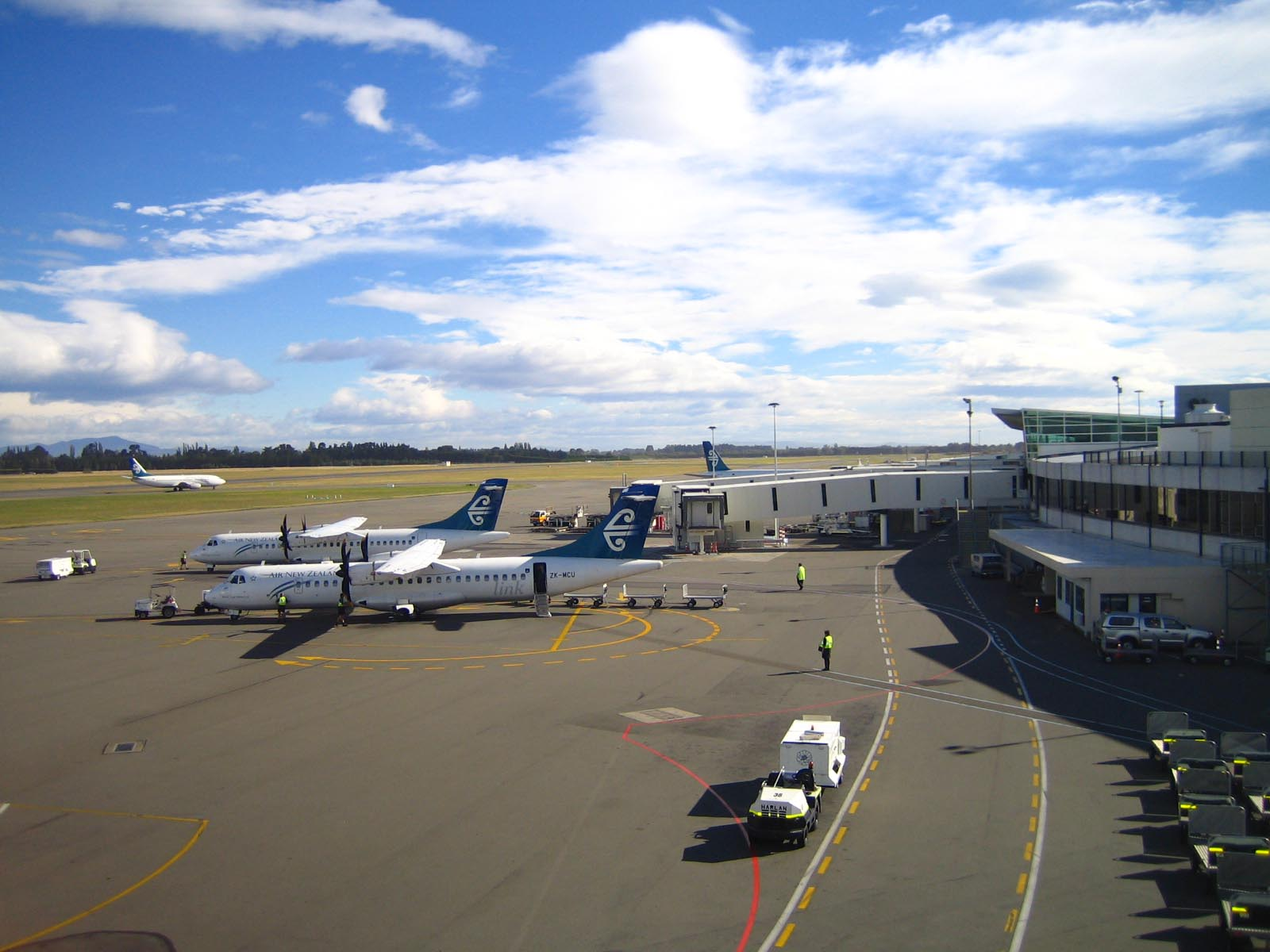
View of the apron from the old roof deck

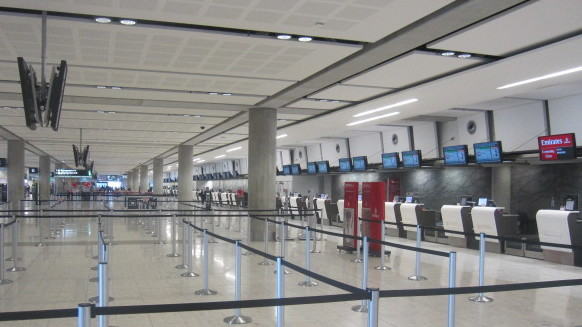
Check-in hall, December 2013

In 1935, the local council decided to locate a new aerodrome at Harewood as the best site for Christchurch. Development of the aerodrome at Harewood commenced in 1936 when 227 hectares (560 acres) of land was purchased. In 1937, a 915-metre (3,002 ft) runway and a 60-square-metre (650 sq ft) terminal were constructed. In 1940, the airport became RNZAF Station Harewood. By 1946 the form of the terminal area development was established with hangars, a small terminal building, the water tower and some barracks buildings. In 1950, Christchurch Airport received clearance for international operations from the government. The two runways and parallel taxiway concept was established in 1953–runway 02/20 at 2,012 metres (6,601 ft) and 11/29 at 1,741 metres (5,712 ft). In 1954, TEAL introduced Douglas DC-6 aircraft to its trans-Tasman services. In February 1960, a new terminal building, designed by architect Paul Pascoe, was brought into operation.

A 1,400 ft (427 m) southwest extension to runway 02/20 opened in November 1963, extending the runway to 8,000 ft (2,438 m) and providing for commercial jet operations. In April 1965, scheduled jet services were launched by Qantas to Sydney using the Boeing 707.

Later in 1966, an international wing was added to the domestic terminal. In October 1968, NAC operated its first Boeing 737 to the airport. SAFE Air introduced a Chatham Island air link to Christchurch in December 1969. In 1972 the north-west runway was completely resealed and repainted. The first scheduled Boeing 747 service to land in New Zealand arrived on 3 December 1972, a Qantas flight from Sydney. Air New Zealand introduced its McDonnell Douglas DC-10 aircraft to trans-Tasman services from 31 October 1973.

Extensions to the domestic terminal were completed in September 1975 with a new two level pier added, more than doubling the total floor area. In October that year, Air New Zealand began a weekly DC-8 service linking Christchurch to Nadi, Rarotonga and Papeete. Air New Zealand opened its No.1 Hangar at the airport in August 1979. In December 1980 the two Australian domestic airlines Ansett and Trans Australia Airlines commenced scheduled services from Hobart within a few days of each other.

In June 1982, the government approved an 845 m (2,772 ft) northeastern extension to runway 02/20 at the cost of $7 miliion. The extension was officially opened on 6 July 1984 by Prime Minister Rob Muldoon, bringing the runway to its present length of 3,288 m (10,787 ft).

In February 1985, Newmans Air started scheduled de Havilland Canada Dash 7 services on the tourist routes. The first-ever Air New Zealand Boeing 767 service to Melbourne and the inaugural Air New Zealand Boeing 747–200 service to Los Angeles via Honolulu and Nadi (known as the southern connection) departed in October 1985. In October 1986, Singapore Airlines started Boeing 747 services to the city. The following month, the first British Airways Boeing 747 flight from London arrived. In July 1987, Ansett New Zealand started flying on domestic trunk routes using Boeing 737 aircraft. Also in 1987, the terminal was extended to accommodate Ansett New Zealand and new Air New Zealand lounges; and domestic airbridges were added. Thai Airways began a weekly DC-10 service from Bangkok in November 1988. In March 1989, Air New Zealand introduced a weekly Boeing 747 service from Tokyo and the following month a Boeing 767 service to Perth was introduced. Although dropped years later, the Perth route was restored on a seasonal basis in 2013 with the same aircraft until 2016, when it was upgauged to a Boeing 787 Dreamliner.

The first Concorde to visit Christchurch was British Airways Concorde G-BOAF on 9 April 1989, arriving from Tahiti on a world tour. It departed towards Sydney on 12 April, in which it lost part of its vertical stabiliser over the Tasman Sea. In September 1990, stage 1 of the International Antarctic Centre tourist attraction was officially opened.

Air Pacific (now Fiji Airways) started a weekly direct flight to Nadi, Fiji in April 1993. Korean Airlines commenced flying to Christchurch in July 1994 using MD-11 aircraft, this was a weekly service from Seoul. In April 1997 Origin Pacific Airways started operations at the airport with flights to Nelson. The Canterbury Aero Club opened a new complex to the north-west side of the airport in October 1998. In September 1998, the new international terminal building was completed, creating an additional 28,000 square metres (301,000 sq ft) of floor space. In 2004, expansion of the international terminal was completed to create five more international stands and four more international airbridges. Pacific Blue Airlines commenced trans-Tasman flights from Christchurch (its New Zealand base) in January 2004. Emirates started flying to Christchurch from Dubai and Melbourne with Airbus A340 aircraft in July 2004, later switching to a Sydney-Bangkok-Dubai service with a Boeing 777-300ER aircraft before upgrading to a daily Airbus A380 service while dropping Bangkok on 30 October 2016. Jetstar started serving the city with trans-Tasman flights in December 2005. Construction of the five level carpark building commenced in March 2006. Origin Pacific ceased operations in September 2006.

=== Airport redevelopment ===
Christchurch Airport underwent an extensive expansion project, beginning in March 2006 when construction commenced on a new multi-storey $13 million car park building which opened early in 2007. The new building provided 570 new covered car spaces. Once it was complete, part of the existing car park area was closed to allow for the extra space required for the expanded footprint of a new terminal building. A new 45 m (148 ft) tall control tower, positioned close to the new car park building, opened in September 2009. A separate $20 million regional lounge was constructed in 2010 in a joint venture by Air New Zealand and CIAL.

In early 2009, work commenced on replacing the old domestic terminal with a new integrated terminal precinct (ITP) to be built over the existing one. The new terminal replaced the existing ageing domestic terminal and expanded the facilities of the much newer international terminal. Stage 1 of the new terminal, including the new check-in hall, new food/retail precinct, new single domestic security screening, and the new regional departure lounge and baggage claim of the new terminal was completed in May 2011, allowing the old international check-in and the old domestic terminal north of the main pier to be demolished to make way for Stage 2. Stage 2, which includes the new domestic baggage claim and the northern half of the new domestic departure lounge was completed in February 2012.

The old domestic terminal was completely demolished to make way for the new terminal. All construction was completed by late 2012, with some work such as demolition of the old pier continuing into 2013. Between 200 and 400 workers were active on the site each work day for almost four years. Despite 11,000 earthquakes, the terminal project was completed on budget. The new terminal was officially opened by Prime Minister John Key on 18 April 2013.

=== 2010 onwards ===
In April 2011, AirAsia X commenced Airbus A330 services to Kuala Lumpur; these were short lived, ending in May 2012. China Airlines operated seasonal flights from Taipei via Sydney with Airbus A330 aircraft from December 2014 to 2018. An unusual irregular visitor is Uzbekistan Airways, which operates Boeing 767 charters from Tashkent via Kuala Lumpur carrying Russian fishing crews.

Cathay Pacific Launched flights from Hong Kong International Airport in December 2017. As of 2026, Cathay Pacific flies to Christchurch seasonally between early November and late March, predominantly with A350-1000 aircraft five times a week.

In December 2023, United Airlines began operating a seasonal non-stop service from San Francisco. This service is the first and only flight connecting North America with the South Island, coming after American Airlines' abandoned plans for a direct flight to Los Angeles in the midst of the COVID-19 pandemic in 2020.

Starting in June 2024, the food court of the airport underwent a major renovation, replacing some older restaurants with new ones, and updating the aesthetic. These renovations were finished by January 2025.

In June 2025, Air New Zealand announced a seasonal direct service to Adelaide, set to launch in late October. Beginning as a seasonal service, it will connect the South Island of New Zealand to South Australia for the first time. The service was supposed to finish in early April, but due to high demand was extended until early May. The service returned in October 2026.

After six years of no long-haul flying from Christchurch, on 20 May 2026 Air New Zealand announced the resumption of seasonal nonstop flights from Christchurch to Perth Airport (last served in 2020), Changi Airport (last served in 2020) and Narita International Airport (last served in 2015) with Boeing 787-9 aircraft.

On 26 May 2026, Air New Zealand commenced flights between Christchurch and Rarotonga on a seasonal basis.

Starting in Winter 2027, Air New Zealand will commence flying between Christchurch Airport and Ngurah Rai International Airport, Denpasar, thrice weekly until the end of August. On the same day this was announced, the carrier also announced its seasonal thrice-weekly Changi Airport service would increase to year-round, rather than starting in October and finishing in late March.

== Kowhai Park ==
The 168MWp Kowhai Park Solar Farm is being built on 400 hectares of land owned by the airport and Environment Canterbury south west of the main runway. The airport is building a new substation and grid connection for the solar farm to feed into the New Zealand grid, and for the airport to increase its electricity use as part of its sustainability goals. The farm is planned to produce around 290 GWh per year, equivalent to the yearly consumption of 36,000 average New Zealand households.

== Runways ==
The preferred option by the airport company for increasing the capacity of the existing runways is by introducing independent operations. This can be achieved by adding a 300 m (980 ft) extension to the north-eastern end of the main runway 20/02 which would give it a total length of 3,600 m (11,800 ft). When the prevailing north-easterly winds are blowing this would allow for intersection departures for most aircraft types while other aircraft land on runway 11. Large wide body aircraft would still have to use the full length of the runway. The runway 11/29 would be widened to 45 m (148 ft) and extended by 250 m (820 ft) to the north-west into the Harewood golf course; the airport has purchased land from the club already. This would increase the runway length to 1,981 metres (6,499 ft) and is estimated to cost $12 million, as presently some Tasman and Pacific Island flights are unable to take off fully loaded in nor'west wind conditions. A runway end safety area (RESA) will be added to each end to make it comply with ICAO standards. Eventually all the runways will have a RESA. Also Runway 11/29 may be lengthened up to 2,000 m (6,600 ft) to provide for enhanced take-off capability for Code D (Boeing 767-sized aircraft) and Code E (Boeing 777, Boeing 787, Airbus A350) aircraft flying on medium and long haul routes in northwest wind operational conditions. When completed with peak operation periods both runways will be used simultaneously. Statistics indicated that Runway 02 was used 70% of the time, Runway 20 at 20%, Runway 29 at 8% and Runway 11 (predominantly for landings) at 2% of the time.

== Terminal and gates ==
Christchurch Airport consists of a single terminal that caters for both domestic and international flights. It is 77,591 m^{2} (835,180 sq ft) in size and is situated on the eastern side of the airport.

The main terminal building contains a combined check-in hall for domestic and international flights. It has 58 check-in counters, in addition to self-service check-in kiosks. A common baggage claim hall is also located on the ground floor. There is a large retail area on the first floor, with many food and retail outlets as well as waiting areas. A major feature of the terminal is a $15 million state-of-the-art baggage handling system, which is 750 metres (2,460 ft) long.

The airport has 37 gates in total. The regional wing is located in the south-west of the terminal, and handles all Air New Zealand Link turboprop flights. It has 12 gates, numbered 3–14. The central zone handles mainline Air New Zealand and Jetstar domestic services and has eight gates (16–22a) and gates (15, 15a, 15b, 15c); all (except Gate 15, which can be shared with turboprops) are equipped with jetbridges. The international wing is located in the north-east section of the terminal and has 13 gates (23–35), all except 33 have jetbridges. Gates 21/24 and 22/25 are shared swing gates which can be used for domestic or international flights as the need arises. Gate 30 has a dual jetbridge which is used for the Airbus A380. When available it can also accommodate two narrow body jets gate position 30R and 31.

== Airlines and destinations ==
As of December 2023, Christchurch airport is served by 11 airlines with scheduled services. The airport has direct flights to 18 domestic and 10 international destinations. A total of 900 scheduled domestic and 157 international flights arrive and depart each week.

=== Passenger ===
Airlines	Destinations
Air Chathams	Chatham Islands
Air New Zealand	Auckland, Brisbane, Dunedin, Hamilton, Hokitika, Invercargill, Melbourne, Napier, Nelson, New Plymouth, Palmerston North, Queenstown, Rotorua, Singapore, Sydney–Kingsford Smith, Tauranga, Wellington; Seasonal: Adelaide, Gold Coast, Perth (resumes 30 November 2026), Rarotonga, Tokyo–Narita (resumes 28 November 2026)
Cathay Pacific	Seasonal: Hong Kong
China Southern Airlines	Seasonal: Guangzhou
Emirates	Dubai–International, Sydney–Kingsford Smith
Fiji Airways	Nadi
Jetstar	Auckland, Gold Coast, Hamilton, Melbourne, Sydney–Kingsford Smith, Wellington; Seasonal: Perth
Originair	Blenheim, Nelson, Palmerston North
Qantas	Brisbane, Melbourne, Sydney–Kingsford Smith
Singapore Airlines	Singapore
United Airlines	Seasonal: San Francisco

=== Cargo ===
Airlines	Destinations
Airwork	Auckland
ASL Airlines Australia	Auckland, Brisbane, Melbourne, Sydney–Kingsford Smith
DHL Aviation	Auckland, Melbourne, Sydney–Kingsford Smith
FedEx Express	Auckland, Melbourne, Sydney–Kingsford Smith
Parcelair	Auckland, Palmerston North
Qantas Freight	Auckland, Melbourne, Sydney–Kingsford Smith
Texel Air Australasia	Auckland, Palmerston North

== Statistics ==
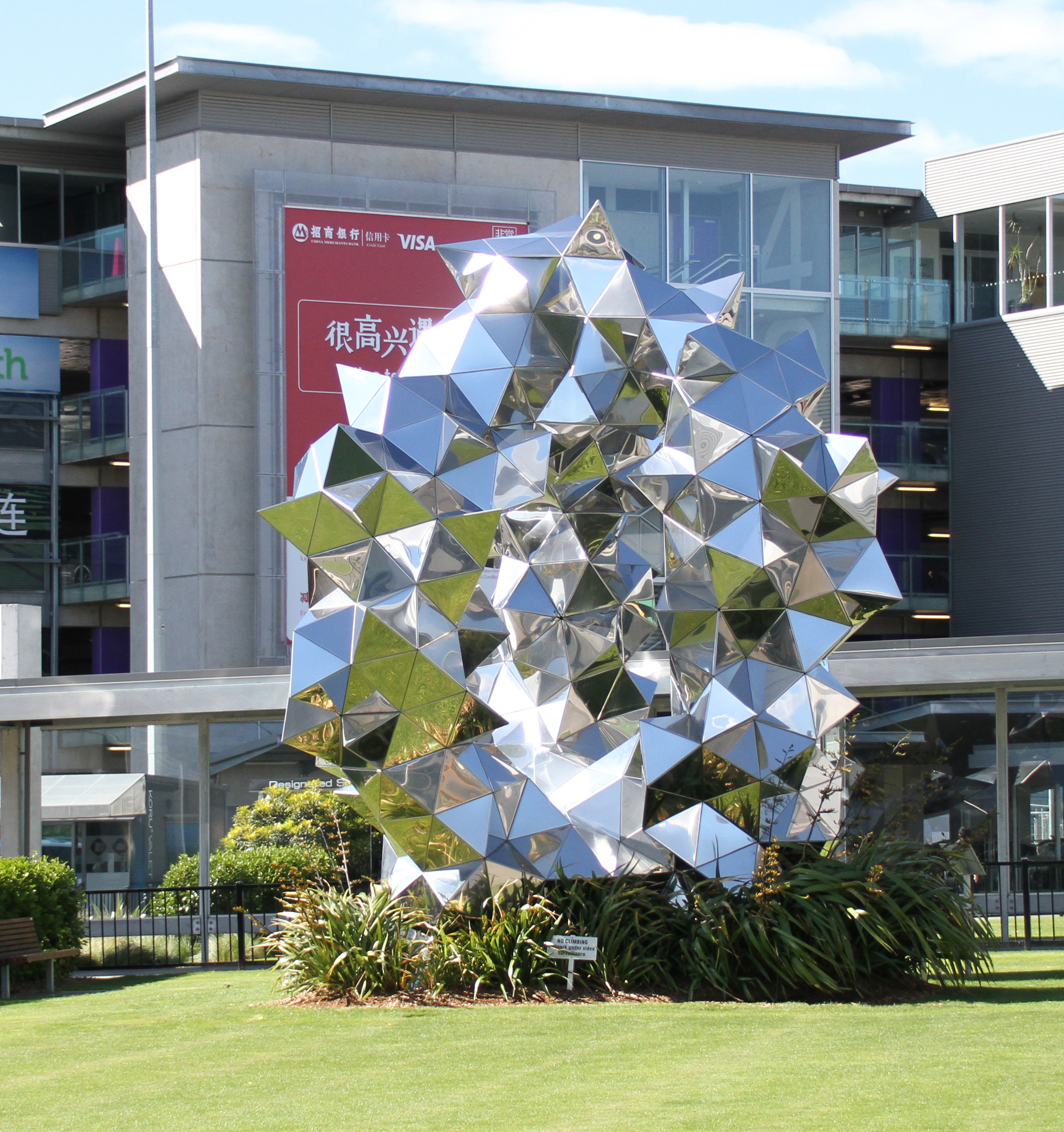
A sculpture outside the terminal

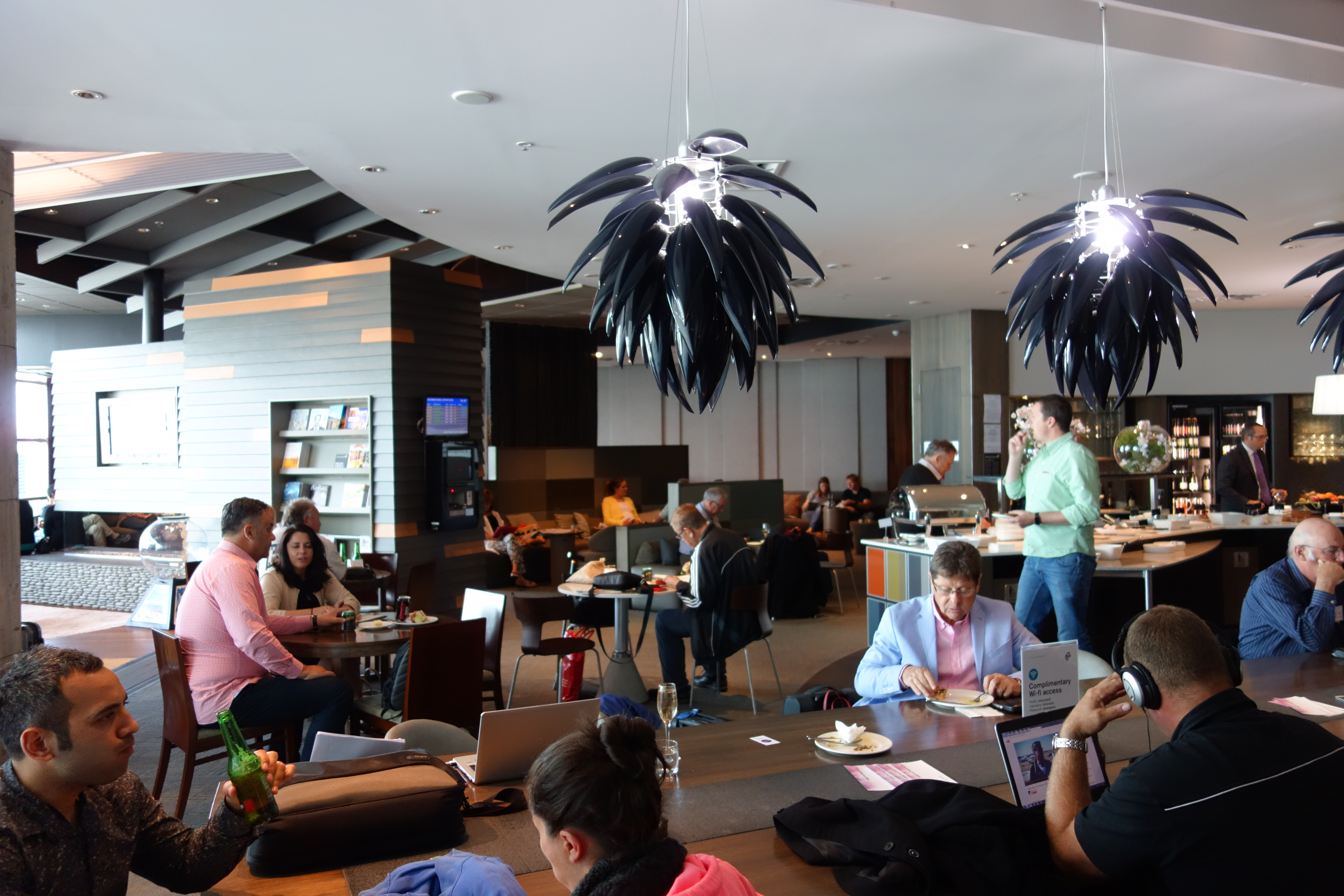
Air New Zealand lounge in the international part of the airport

As the gateway for Christchurch and the South Island, Christchurch Airport is New Zealand's second largest airport.

A total of 6,623,365 passengers travelled in and out of Christchurch Airport in the year of 2025, an increase of 5.4 per cent over the previous year.

A record 6.31 million passengers travelled in the 2016 year. Airline seat capacity grew 7% to 7.9 million passengers with several new services starting.

=== Total ===
Operational statistics
Year	Passenger movements	Operating revenue ($NZ thousand)	Aircraft movements
2003	4,593,219	54,944	86,701
2004	5,136,075	63,273	90,794
2005	5,556,325	70,824	88,828
2006	5,472,162	74,715	86,196
2007	5,484,570	83,700	82,134
2008	5,905,211	89,400	84,092
2009	5,908,077	89,200	82,073
2010	6,000,414	93,600	79,016
2011	5,775,700	97,900	75,529
2012	5,551,600	113,100	73,184
2013	5,500,375	118,500	71,715
2014	5,690,000	130,700	71,201
2015	6,092,827	159,000	104,670
2016	6,439,703	169,924	94,955
2017	6,732,730	177,272	95,432
2018	6,870,000	182,600	97,000
2019	6,931,441	187,400	
2020	5,194,982		
2021	3,705,373		
2022	3,257,414		42,653
2023	6,012,328		
2024	6,281,655	233,100	91,460
2025	6,623,365		

=== Routes ===
Busiest international routes to and from CHC (2025)
Rank	Airport	Passengers
1	Sydney	566,336
2	Melbourne	377,270
3	Brisbane	255,991
4	Singapore	194,451
5	Gold Coast	105,106
6	Nadi	50,735
7	Guangzhou (Note: Seasonal route)	45,162
8	Hong Kong (Note: Seasonal route)	43,507
9	Cairns	28,294
10	San Francisco (Note: Seasonal route)	16,844
11	Adelaide (Note: Seasonal route, began November 2025)	4,819

== Operations ==
=== Military ===
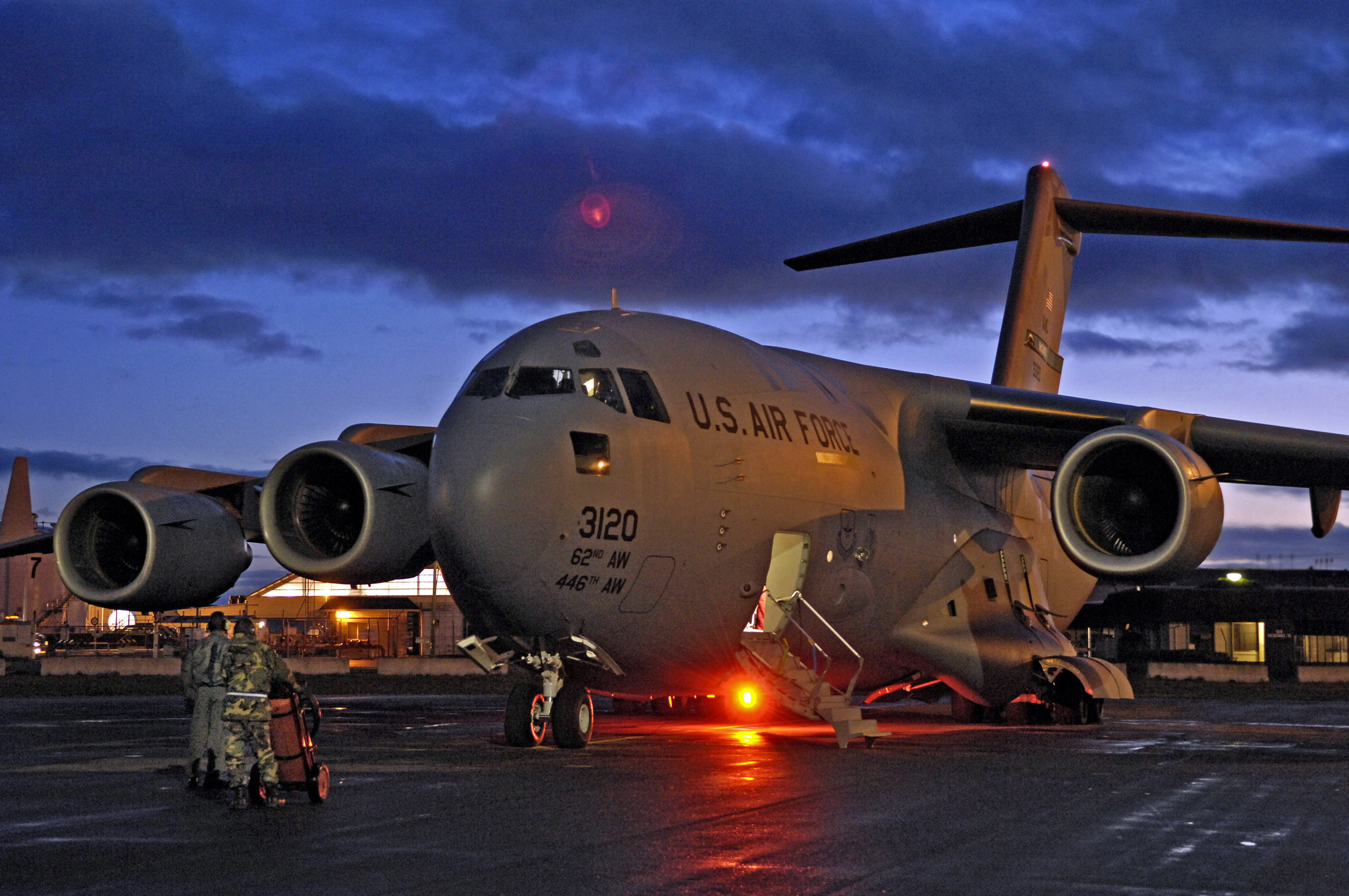
United States Air Force Boeing C-17 Globemaster III on the tarmac at Christchurch Airport

Since the closure of RNZAF Base Wigram, the Royal New Zealand Air Force (RNZAF) always flies to Christchurch International Airport when visiting the city. There are regular RNZAF flights between Wellington, Ohakea, Auckland.

With the development of Antarctic scientific expeditions, since the 1950s Christchurch Airport has been the base for all Antarctic flights operated by the United States Navy, the United States Air Force, the United States Air National Guard, and the Royal New Zealand Air Force as part of Operation Deep Freeze.

=== SOFIA ===
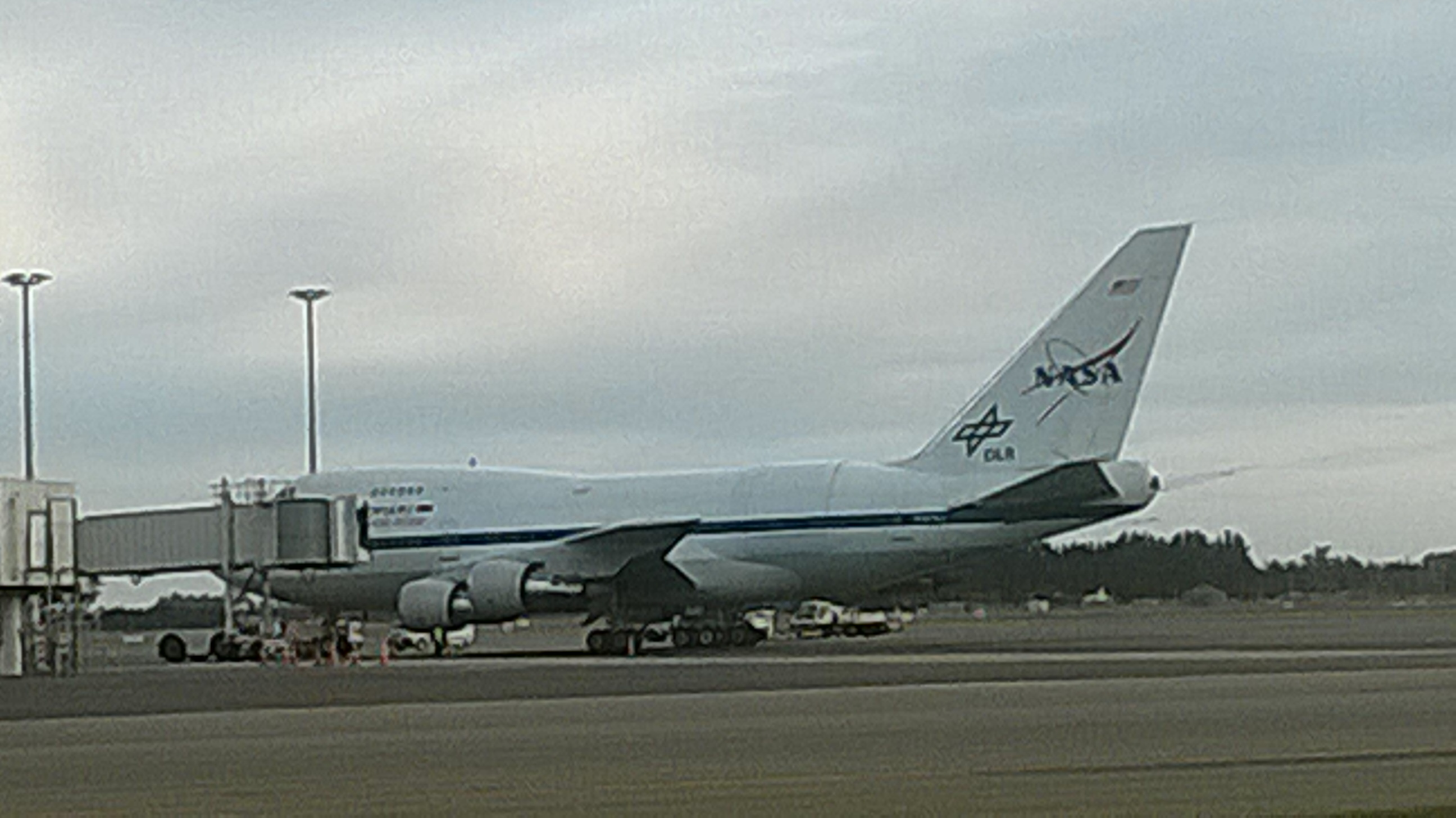
SOFIA 747 at the gate in Christchurch

In July 2013, a Boeing 747SP modified as the Stratospheric Observatory for Infrared Astronomy (SOFIA) airborne telescope landed at the airport. A spokesman said it was likely that Christchurch would be a winter base for SOFIA for twenty years. The city was chosen as a southern hemisphere base because of the long airport runway and the favourable atmospheric conditions and relatively empty airspace in southern New Zealand.

=== General aviation ===
There are several general aviation organisations operating from the airport. Garden City Helicopters operates from a base adjacent to the airport (ICAO: NZGI). It operates a medivac service using fixed-wing aircraft (NZ Flying Doctor Service), charter flights and also operates the rescue helicopter in Canterbury with a secondary helipad in Hagley Park adjacent to Christchurch Hospital (ICAO: NZJC). Christchurch International Airport Limited maintains a grass runway parallel to the primary runway for the Canterbury Aero Club. Among the general aviation companies, Mainland Air operates flights to Oamaru. Air Safaris runs a link service to Lake Tekapo Airport.

=== Aviation services ===
The Christchurch Engine Centre, established in 1953, is located at the airport and is now a joint facility run by Pratt & Whitney and Air New Zealand. A full MRO service is offered to IAE V2500 engines. Formerly, PW JT8D and Rolls-Royce Dart engines were overhauled at the facility. Air New Zealand has several maintenance facilities at the airport such as 1 Hangar (which can accommodate six Code C aircraft), 3 Hangar (one Code C aircraft) and 5 Hangar (one Code C aircraft) but no longer has a paint hangar.

== Access, ground transport, and parking ==
The main access road into the airport connects to both Russley Road (State Highway 1) and Memorial Avenue at a diamond interchange. The distance from the airport to the city centre is roughly 10 km (6.2 mi).

A drop off and pick up area called 'The Loop' is situated on the ground floor of the multi-level car park building. A number of different taxi and shuttle companies operate services from the airport terminals. Uber also partnered with CIAL to have a dedicated pick-up and drop-off zone for its service.

Three different city bus routes service the airport terminal: the number 3 route to the central city via Avonhead and Riccarton, continuing to Sumner; the number 29 route to the central city via Fendalton; and the number 125 on its route from Redwood to Halswell. In late August 2023, a fourth bus line was announced to be serving the Airport, the 8 Port to Port Route. With service starting September 4, this bus travels between the airport and the port town of Lyttelton via the CBD.

== Accidents and incidents ==
- On 21 November 1957 at 11.33am a SAFE Air Bristol Freighter (registered ZK-AYH) suffered a catastrophic structural failure on a flight from Paraparaumu to Oamaru and crashed on the Russley Golf Course very near the airport with the loss of all four lives.
- On 6 June 2003, an Air Adventures New Zealand Ltd Piper PA-31 Chieftain (registered ZK-NCA) crashed into trees and terrain 1.2 nmi (2.2 km; 1.4 mi) short of runway 20, killing the pilot and seven of the nine passengers on board. The aircraft was flying too low during an ILS approach in foggy weather.
- An attempted hijacking of Eagle Airways Flight 2279 from Blenheim to Christchurch occurred on 8 February 2008. After the British Aerospace Jetstream 32EP landed, the offender, a Somalian woman, was overpowered by the two pilots and she was later arrested at the scene on Runway 29 after the aircraft came to a stop.
- In November 2014, a New Zealand Member of Parliament, Gerry Brownlee, was fined $2000 by the Civil Aviation Authority for a breach of security that occurred at Christchurch Airport on 24 July 2014. An official inquiry found that Brownlee (then Minister of Transport) and two of his aides had evaded security screening by entering a departure lounge through an exit door while in a rush to board a domestic flight.
- On 31 May 2024, a Jetstar Airbus A320 (registered VH-VFF) operating flight JQ225 from Auckland lost directional control while landing on runway 02 and slid off the edge of the runway. No injuries were reported, but the airport was closed while the aircraft was towed to the terminal and the runway inspected.

== Demographics ==
The statistical area of Christchurch Airport, which includes commercial areas near the airport, covers 11.45 km^{2} (4.42 sq mi). It had an estimated population of 140 as of June 2025, with a population density of 12.2 people per km^{2}.

Historical population
Year	Pop.	±% p.a.
2006	183	—
2013	168	−1.21%
2018	177	+1.05%
2023	153	−2.87%

Christchurch Airport had a population of 153 in the 2023 New Zealand census, a decrease of 24 people (−13.6%) since the 2018 census, and a decrease of 15 people (−8.9%) since the 2013 census. There were 84 males, 66 females, and 3 people of other genders in 78 dwellings. 5.9% of people identified as LGBTIQ+. The median age was 59.7 years (compared with 38.1 years nationally). There were 6 people (3.9%) aged under 15 years, 18 (11.8%) aged 15 to 29, 81 (52.9%) aged 30 to 64, and 51 (33.3%) aged 65 or older.

People could identify as more than one ethnicity. The results were 84.3% European (Pākehā), 15.7% Māori, 2.0% Pasifika, 9.8% Asian, and 2.0% other, which includes people giving their ethnicity as "New Zealander". English was spoken by 98.0%, and other languages by 13.7%. The percentage of people born overseas was 15.7, compared with 28.8% nationally.

Religious affiliations were 35.3% Christian, 3.9% Hindu, 2.0% Buddhist, and 2.0% other religions. People who answered that they had no religion were 47.1%, and 7.8% of people did not answer the census question.

Of those at least 15 years old, 18 (12.2%) people had a bachelor's or higher degree, 66 (44.9%) had a post-high school certificate or diploma, and 60 (40.8%) people exclusively held high school qualifications. The median income was $35,800, compared with $41,500 nationally. 12 people (8.2%) earned over $100,000 compared to 12.1% nationally. The employment status of those at least 15 was 69 (46.9%) full-time, 18 (12.2%) part-time, and 6 (4.1%) unemployed.

== See also ==
- List of airports in New Zealand
- List of airlines of New Zealand
- List of busiest airports in New Zealand
- Transport in New Zealand
