= Palmerston North Airport =

Domestic airport in Milson, Manawatū-Whanganui, New Zealand

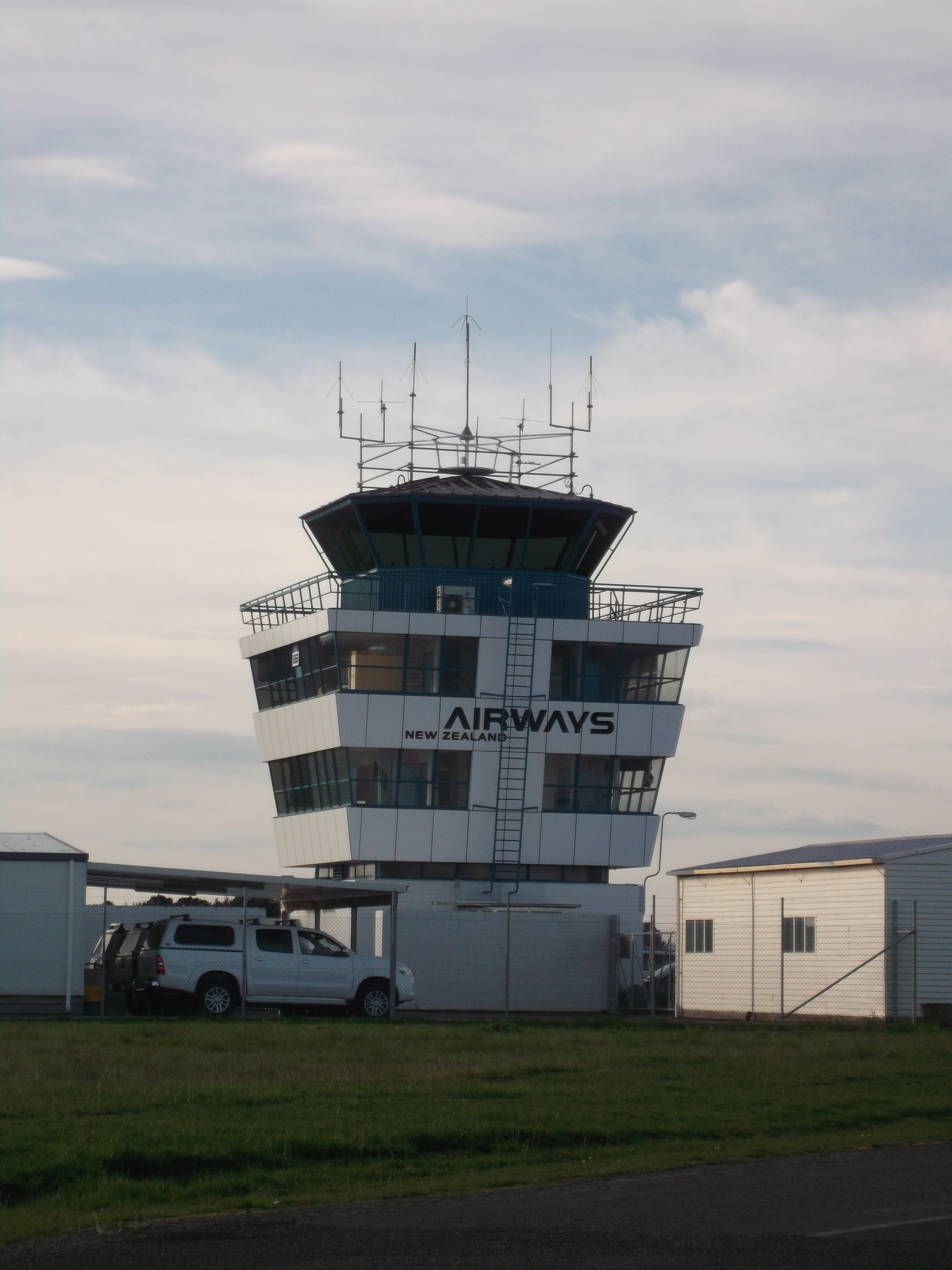
- Air traffic control tower for PMR/NZPM
- IATA: PMR; ICAO: NZPM

Summary
- Airport type: Public
- Owner: Palmerston North City Council
- Operator: Palmerston North Airport
- Serves: Palmerston North
- Location: Milson, Manawatū-Whanganui Region, New Zealand
- Elevation AMSL: 151 ft (46 m)
- Coordinates: 40°19′14″S 175°37′01″E
- Website: www.pnairport.co.nz

Map
- Location of airport in North Island

Runways
Direction	Length		Surface
Direction	ft	m	Surface
07/25	6,240	1,902	Asphalt
07/25	1,985	605	Grass

Statistics
- Passengers (30 June 2018): 652,000
- Movements: 55,960

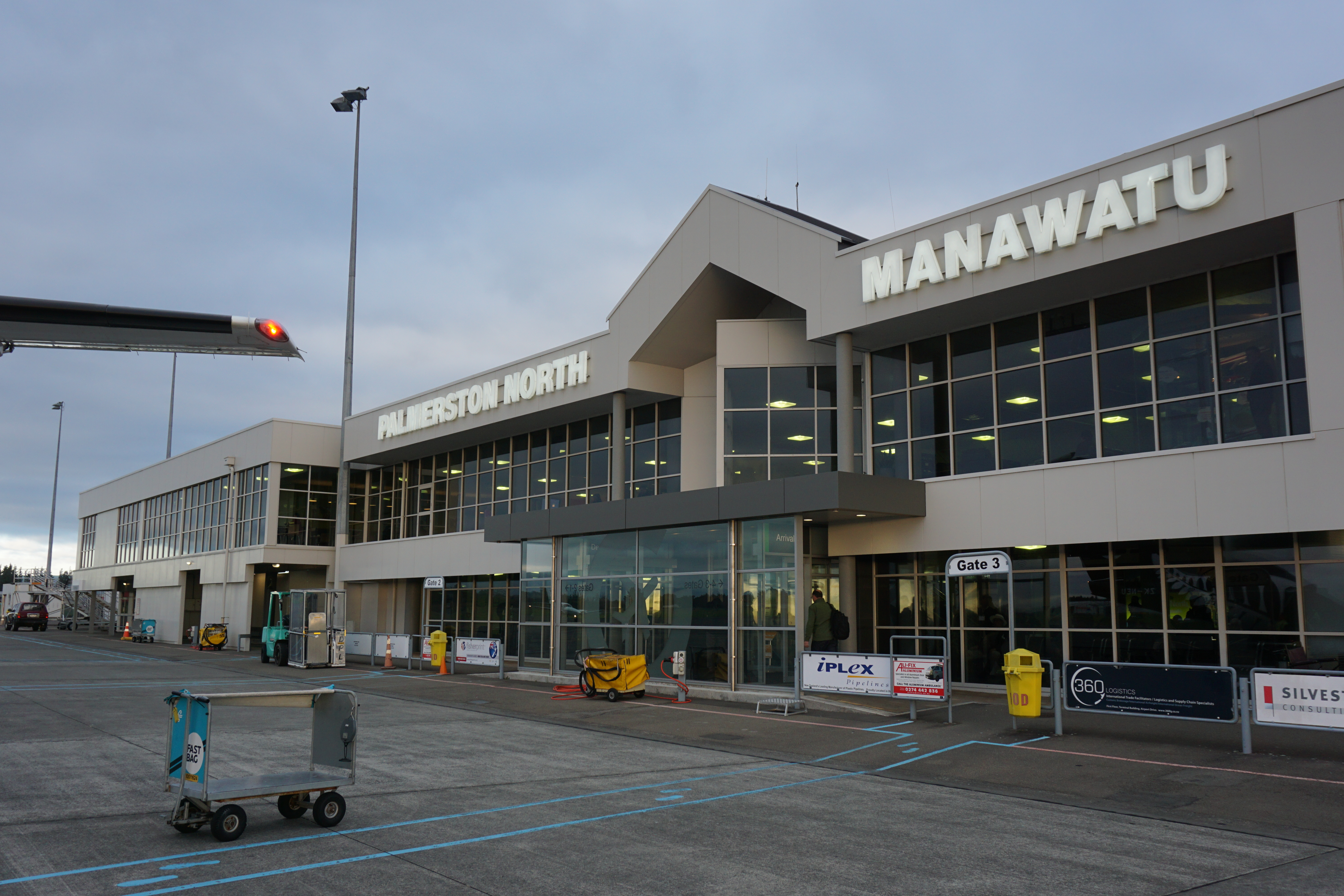
Palmerston North Airport Terminal Building, June 2015

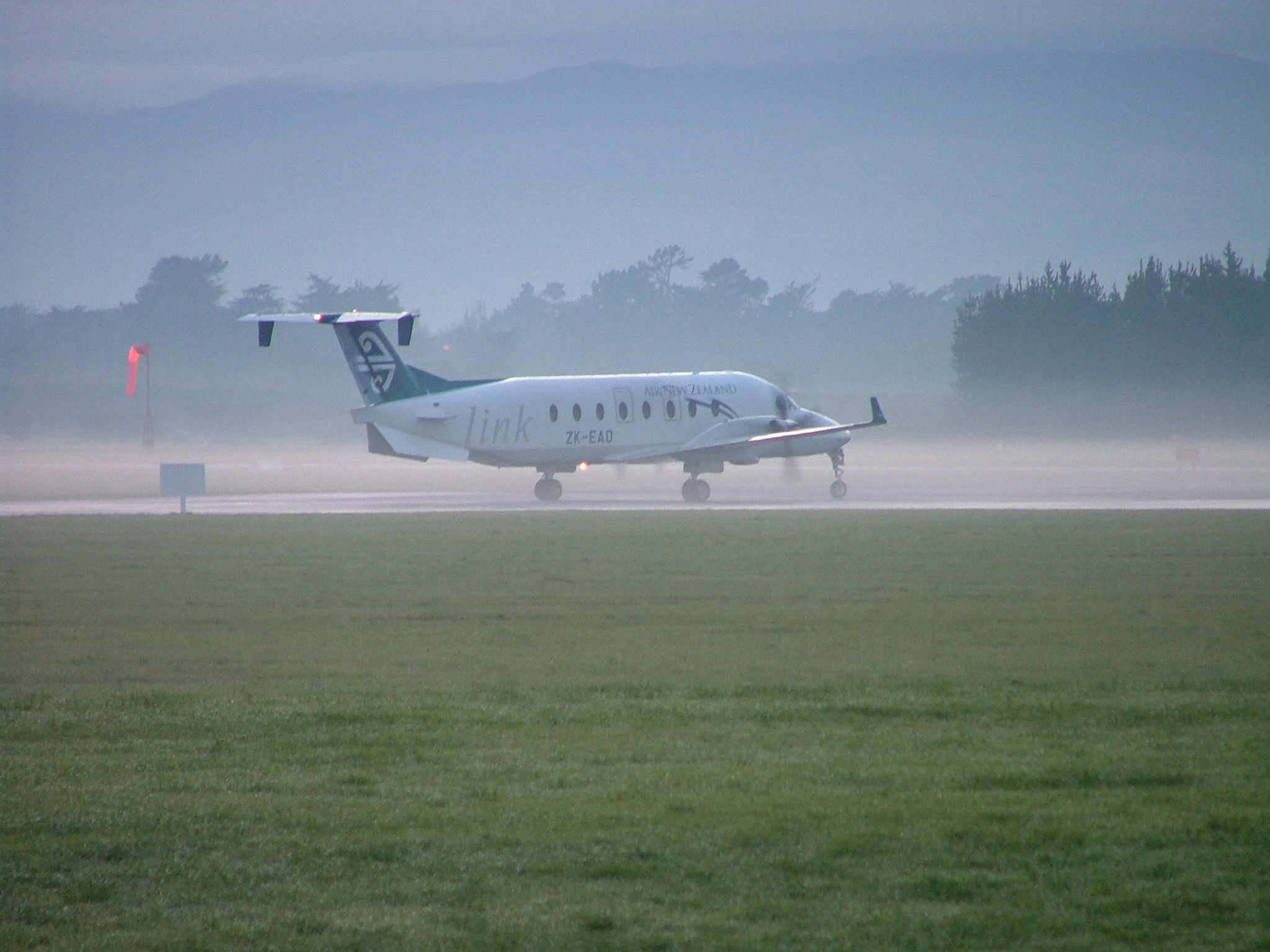
Air New Zealand Link Beechcraft 1900 at Palmerston North Airport.

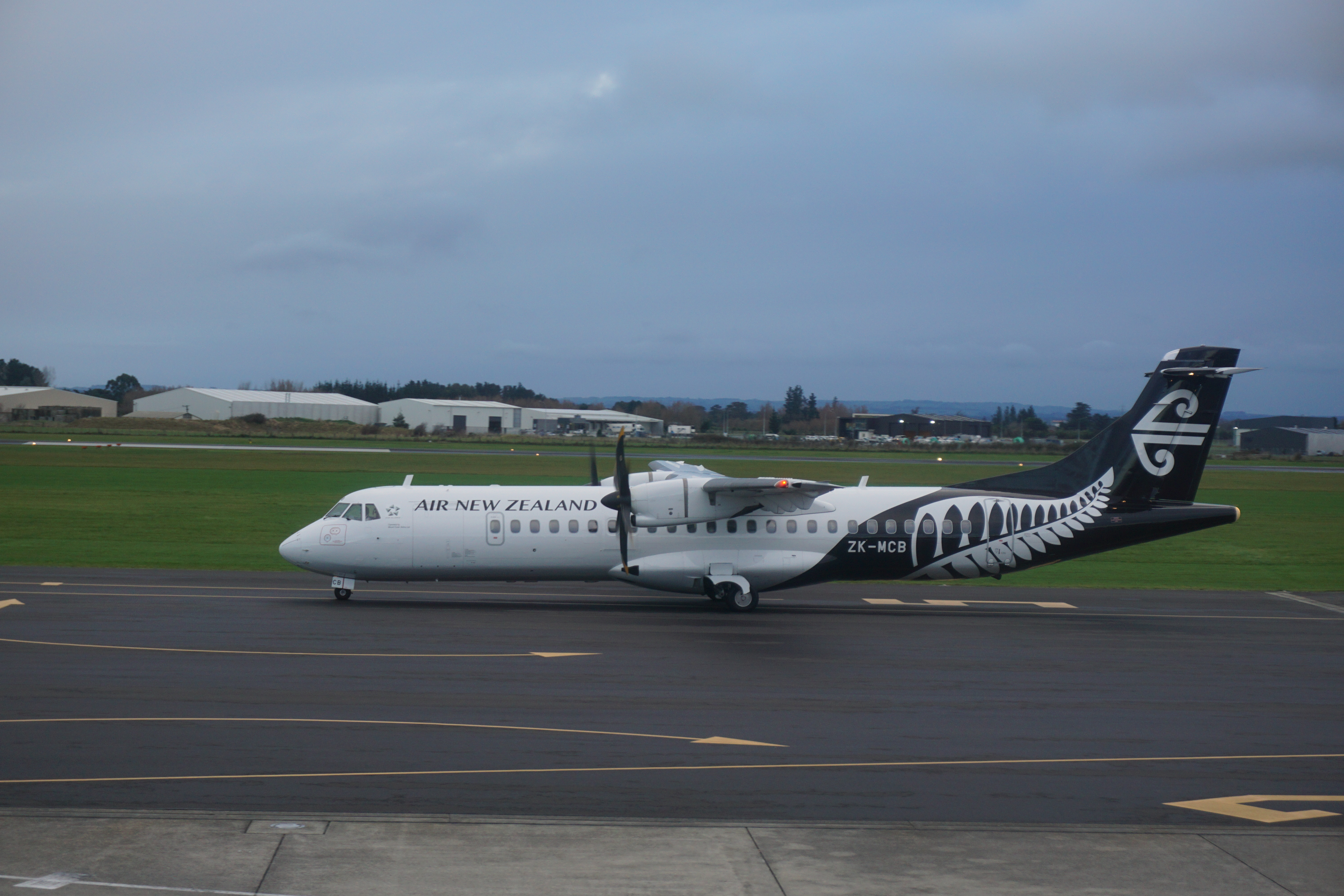
Air New Zealand Link ATR72-500 at Palmerston North Airport

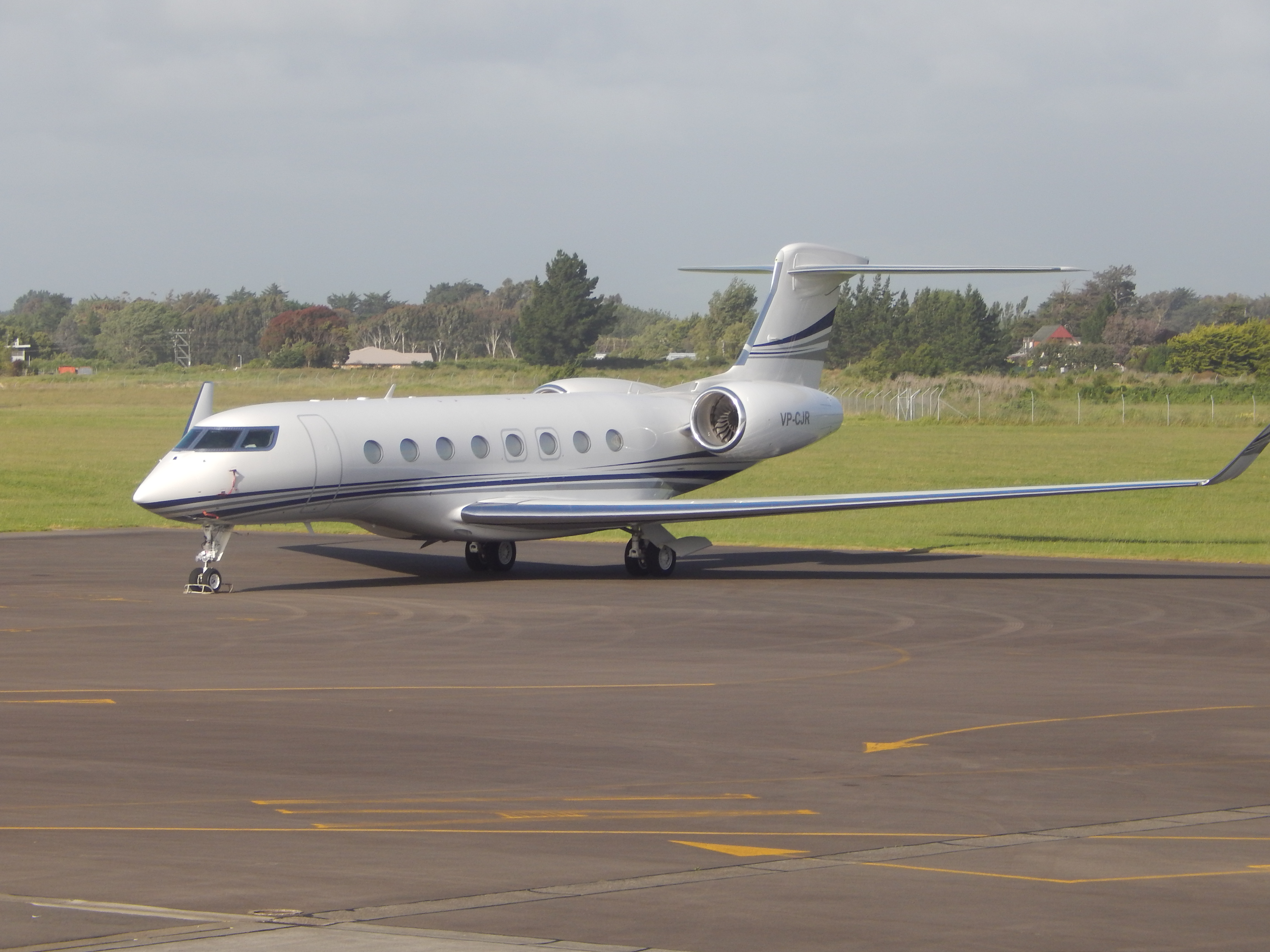
Gulfstream G650 VP-CJR visiting the small regional airport late 2016

Palmerston North Airport (IATA: PMR, ICAO: NZPM), originally called Milson Aerodrome, is an airport in the Manawatū-Whanganui region of New Zealand, serving Palmerston North and the Central North Island regions. It is located in the suburb of Milson, on the outskirts of Palmerston North, New Zealand, approximately 5.5 km (3.4ml) NE from the central business district of Palmerston North. The airport is 100% owned by the Palmerston North City Council and covers an area of 208ha. The airport is New Zealand's 8th busiest and handled a total of 515,727 passengers in the 2016 financial year. The airport handles around 30 commercial passenger flights per day to and from Auckland, Blenheim, Christchurch and Nelson as well as cargo flights on week nights between Auckland and Christchurch.

The airport operates two runways, a sealed 1902m runway and a parallel grass 608m runway, which is utilised for general aviation and training activities by Massey University's School of Aviation. Operating 24/7 with no curfews imposed, the airport has become a freight hub for Parcelair.

Common aircraft operating in Palmerston North Airport are ATR72, Bombardier Q300, Boeing 737-400F, Boeing 737-800BCF and Jetstream 31. Diamond DA40 and DA42 training aircraft used by Massey University's School of Aviation are also commonly seen in the airport. In addition to the normal aircraft types, the airport is able to cater for Airbus A320 aircraft. The airport accommodates charters including business jets through to the larger Airbus A320 aircraft. The airport receives some diverted flights from Wellington due to adverse weather conditions there. The airport has an excellent operational preference, opening majority of the time.

== History ==
The first airfield on this site was created by the Milson Aerodrome Society in 1931, comprising a grass runway. It was used exclusively for private flights. The first commercial flights began in 1936, operated by Union Airways. During World War II the airport was also used as a military facility. When the National Airways Corporation commenced service to the airport in the 1950s the runway was sealed and a terminal building was constructed; jets started to serve the airport domestically operated by Air New Zealand in 1975, beginning with Boeing 737-200s.

A new terminal was constructed in 1992 and a new taxiway was built in 1994. Following the major upgrades of the airport, Freedom Air started regular international flights to Brisbane and Sydney in 1996. Other destinations including Gold Coast, Melbourne and Nadi were added in 1999.

A Royal Brunei Airlines Boeing 767-200 landed at the airport on 10 March 2003 due to diversion, making it the first and only 767 to land at the airport. Since Freedom Air ceased operations in 2008 and Oz jet pulling out of a contract before any flights began, no carrier has served the airport with scheduled international flights.

In 2014, the airport released its Master plan for 2014–2035. Some proposed ideas include further lengthening the runway, a new taxiway parallel to the runway and an Instrument landing system.

Jetstar Airways commenced daily services between Palmerston North and Auckland on 1 February 2016 with their Q300s. These services ended at the end of November 2019.

In 2016 due to an increase in need for overnight mail, Freightways upgraded their New Zealand domestic freight fleet from the ageing Convair 580s and 5800s to the bigger and faster Boeing 737-400Fs under the new company name of Parcelair.

In 2018 Palmerston North Airport contracted Higgins to reconstruct taxiway bravo and charlie. This work was later re-done due to issues with the pavement surface being uneven.

In 2024 Palmerston North Airport began its project to replace the existing terminal with a new, fit for purpose terminal designed to house security screening and enable A320/737 aircraft to operate passenger flights. In 2026 the new $43.4 million PMR terminal project was underway and 42m Coresteel roof beams were installed, having been manufactured in Whangārei and transported to Palmerston North on 47m-long trucks. The first half of the development is expected to be completed by early 2027.

=== World record ===
On 17 May 1998, ten people towed a fully fuelled Freedom Air Boeing 737-300 over 100 metres in 47 seconds, to celebrate the opening of the new runway extensions. The record was logged in the Guinness World Records. This record was surpassed by a team of Royal Marines Reserves in 2001, who achieved the same feat in 43.2 seconds.

== Airlines and destinations ==
=== Passenger ===
Airlines	Destinations
Air New Zealand	Auckland, Christchurch
Originair	Blenheim,Christchurch, Nelson

=== Cargo ===
Airlines	Destinations
Parcelair operated by Airwork	Auckland, Christchurch
Texel Air Australasia	Auckland, Christchurch

== Incidents ==
On 9 June 1995, Ansett New Zealand Flight 703, a de Havilland Canada Dash 8 crashed into the Tararua Ranges, 16 km east of the airport, killing four out of the 21 people on board. The aircraft was on a VOR approach into runway 25 when the right main landing gear jammed and failed to lower, and the aircraft was allowed to descend below profile towards the ranges while the pilots were attempting the alternate gear extension procedure.

== See also ==
- List of airports in New Zealand
- List of airlines of New Zealand
- Transport in New Zealand
- List of busiest airports in New Zealand
