= Parcelair =

Airline of New Zealand

IATA	ICAO	Call sign
—	APK	AIRPAK
- Founded: 25 June 2015
- Fleet size: 2
- Destinations: 3
- Parent company: 50% Airwork and 50% Fieldair
- Headquarters: Palmerston North
- Website: www.fieldair.co.nz

Parcelair is a cargo airline based in Palmerston North, New Zealand. It operates scheduled overnight cargo services on behalf of owners Fieldair Holdings and Airwork Flight Operations. Domestic charter services are also operated.

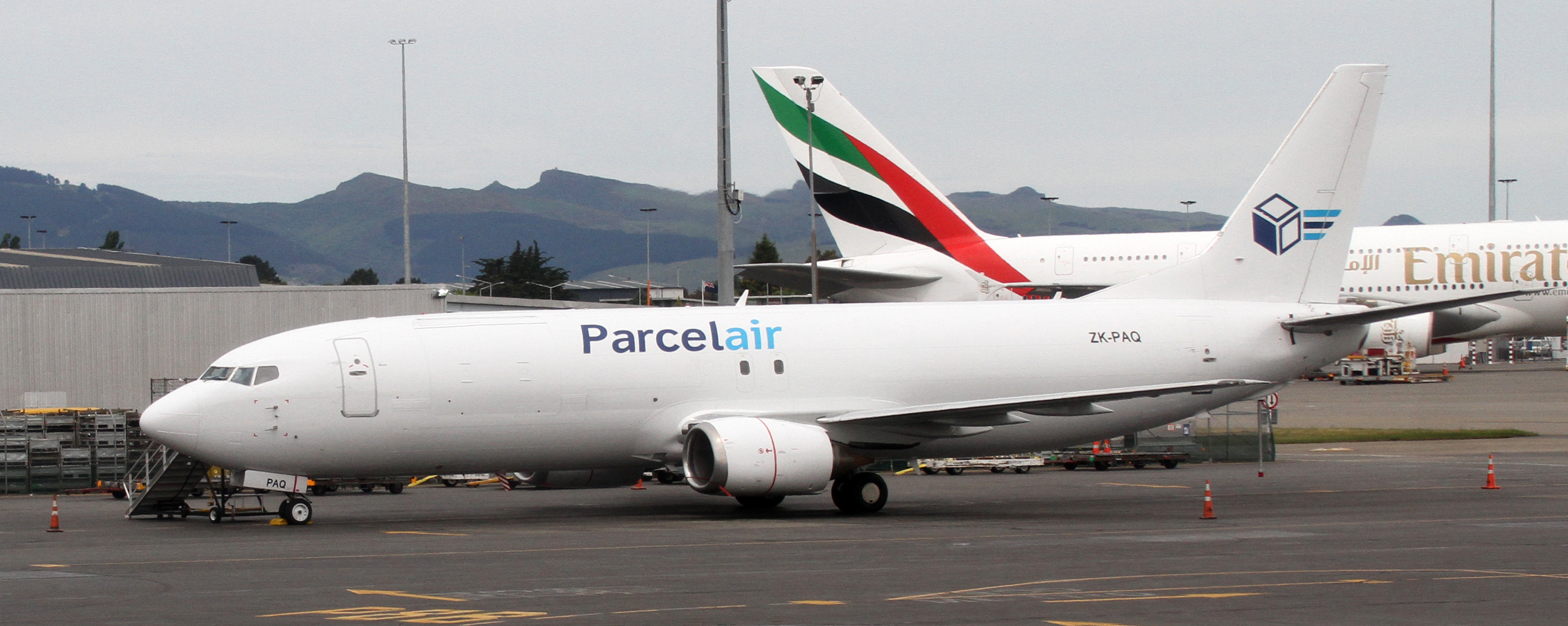
A Parcelair Boeing 737-400F in 2016

== History ==
The airline started operations on the 25th of June, 2015. Its primary contract is with the courier division of the Freightways Group and New Zealand Post. It is a wholly owned company by a 50/50 Joint Venture. The Boeing 737 has a payload of 17 tonnes and carries 11 cargons of freight on each trip. Due to the rapid growth of online shopping there was a need to replace the smaller ageing Convair CV580s operated by Air Freight NZ with the larger Boeing 737s.

== Destinations ==
Parcelair operates freight services between Auckland, Christchurch and Palmerston North, Sydney and Melbourne.

== Fleet ==
- 2 Boeing 737-400SF
